= List of prisoners of Dachau =

Nazi concentration camp prisoners

This is a fragmentary list of people who were imprisoned at Dachau concentration camp.

== Clergy ==
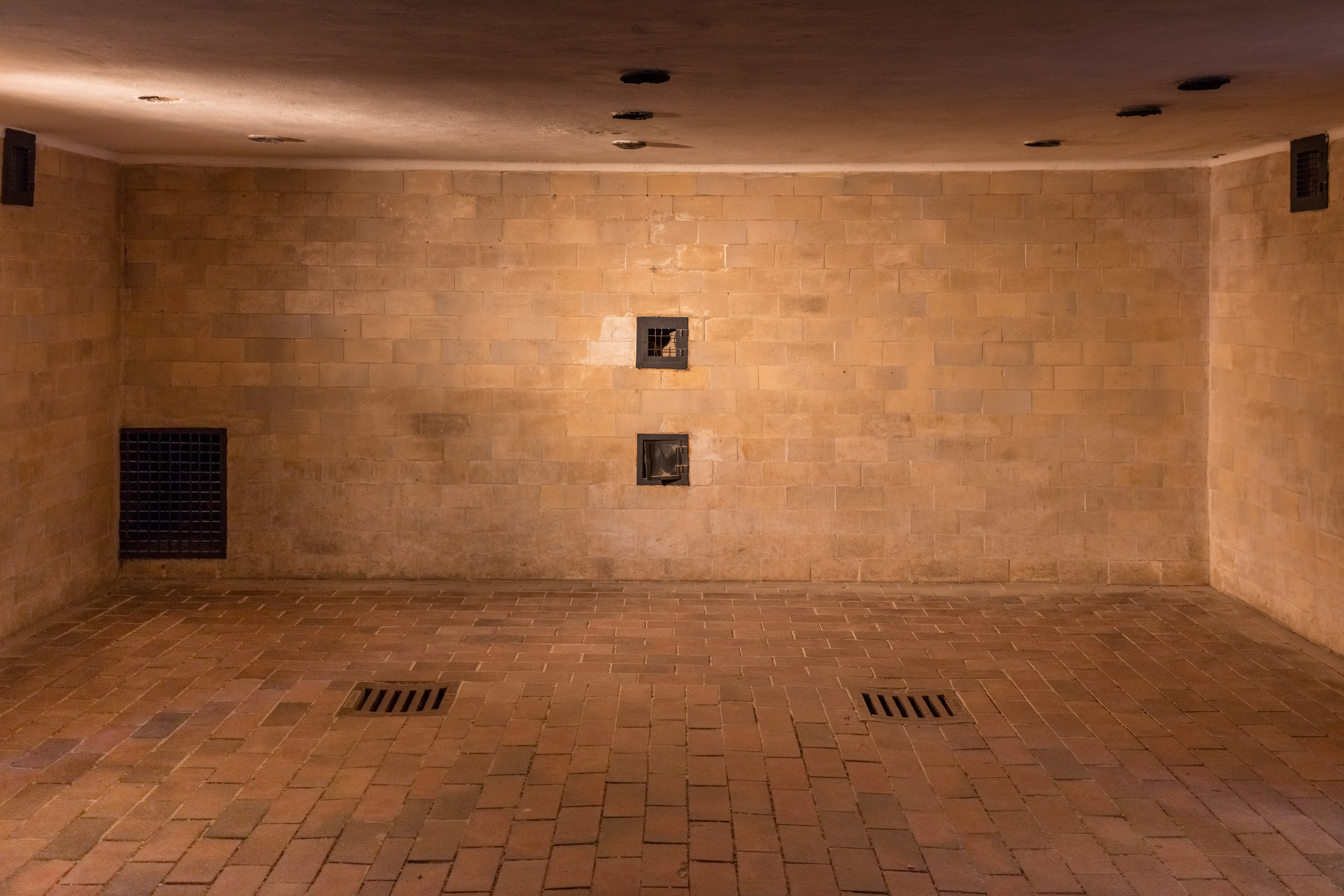
Gas chamber (2016)

Dachau had a special "priest block." Of the 2720 priests (among them 2579 Catholic) held in Dachau, 1034 did not survive the camp. The majority were Polish (1780), of whom 868 died in Dachau.

- Gavrilo V, Serbian Patriarch of the Serbian Orthodox Church, imprisoned in Dachau from September to December 1944
- a number of the Polish 108 Martyrs of World War II:
- Father Jean Bernard (1907–1994), Roman Catholic priest from Luxembourg who was imprisoned from May 1941 to August 1942. He wrote the book Pfarrerblock 25487 about his experiences in Dachau
- Blessed Titus Brandsma, Dutch Carmelite priest and professor of philosophy, died 26 July 1942
- Norbert Čapek (1870–1942) founder of the Unitarian Church in the Czech Republic
- Blessed Stefan Wincenty Frelichowski, Polish Roman Catholic priest, died 23 February 1945
- August Froehlich, German Roman Catholic priest, he protected the rights of the German Catholics and the maltreatment of Polish forced labourers
- Hilary Paweł Januszewski
- Ignacy Jeż later a Catholic bishop
- Joseph Kentenich, founder of the Schoenstatt Movement, spent three and a half years in Dachau
- Bishop Jan Maria Michał Kowalski, the first Minister Generalis (Minister General) of the order of the Mariavites. He perished on 18 May 1942, in a gas chamber in Schloss Hartheim.
- Adam Kozlowiecki, later a Polish Cardinal
- Max Lackmann, Lutheran pastor and founder of League for Evangelical-Catholic Reunion.
- Blessed Karl Leisner, in Dachau since 14 December 1941, liberated 4 May 1945, but died on 12 August from tuberculosis contracted in the camp
- Josef Lenzel, German Roman Catholic priest, helped the Polish forced labourers
- Bernhard Lichtenberg – German Roman Catholic priest, was sent to Dachau but died on his way there in 1943
- Henryk Malak, Polish Roman Catholic priest, who wrote a memoir, Shavelings in Death Camps: A Polish Priest's Memoir of Imprisonment by the Nazis, 1939-1945, published in 2012.
- Martin Niemöller, imprisoned in 1941, liberated 4 May 1945
- Nikolai Velimirović, bishop of the Serbian Orthodox Church and an influential theological writer, venerated as saint in the Eastern Orthodox Church.
- Engelmar Unzeitig (1911–1945) He was a professed member of the Mariannhill Missionaries. The Gestapo arrested Unzeitig on 21 April 1941 for defending Jews in his sermons and sent him to the Dachau concentration camp without a trial on 8 June 1941. In the autumn of 1944 he volunteered to help in catering to victims of typhoid but he soon contracted the disease himself. Unzeitig died of the disease on 2 March 1945 and was cremated. He became known as the "Angel of Dachau".
- Lawrence Wnuk
- Nanne Zwiep, Pastor of the Dutch Reformed Church in Enschede, spoke out from the pulpit against Nazis and their treatment of Dutch Citizens and anti-Semitism, arrested 20 April 1942, died in Dachau of exhaustion and malnutrition 24 November 1942

More than two dozen members of the Religious Society of Friends (known as Quakers) were interned at Dachau. They may or may not have been considered clergy by the Nazis, as all Quakers perform services which in other Protestant denominations are considered the province of clergy. Over a dozen of them were murdered there.

- Titus Brandsma, Dutch priest, philosopher and former rector of Nijmegen University

== Communists ==
- Alfred Andersch, held 6 months in 1933
- Hans Beimler, imprisoned but escaped. Died in the Spanish Civil War.
- Emil Carlebach (Jewish), in Dachau since 1937, sent to Buchenwald concentration camp in 1938
- Alfred Haag, In Dachau from 1935 to 1939, when moved to Mauthausen
- Adolf Maislinger
- Oskar Müller, in Dachau from 1939, liberated 1945
- Walter Vielhauer
- Nikolaos Zachariadis (Greek), from November 1941 to May 1945

== Jews ==
- Hinko Bauer, notable Croatian architect
- Bruno Bettelheim, imprisoned in 1938, freed in 1939; left Germany
- Werner J. Cahnman, sociologist; imprisoned in 1938, freed after 1 year and went to the United States
- Jakob Ehrlich, Member of Vienna's City Council (Rat der Stadt Wien), died in Dachau 17 May 1938
- Viktor Frankl, neurologist and psychiatrist from Vienna, Austria
- Henry P. Glass, Austrian Architect and Industrial Designer, transferred to Buchenwald in September 1938.
- Zvi Griliches – Notable American economist
- Ludwig Kahn, German World War I Veteran and Entrepreneur from 29 Karls Street, Weilheim, Bavaria imprisoned 10 November 1938, freed 19 December 1938
- Hans Litten, anti-Nazi lawyer, died in 1938 by apparent suicide
- Otto Metzger, (1885–1961), German/British engineer and inventor of impact extrusion of containers
- Henry Morgentaler, also survived the Łódź Ghetto, later emigrated to Canada and became central to the abortion-rights movement there
- Alfred Müller, known Croatian entrepreneur from Zagreb
- Benzion Miller, born at the camp, son of Aaron Miller
- Moshe Sanbar, Governor of the Bank of Israel

== Politicians ==
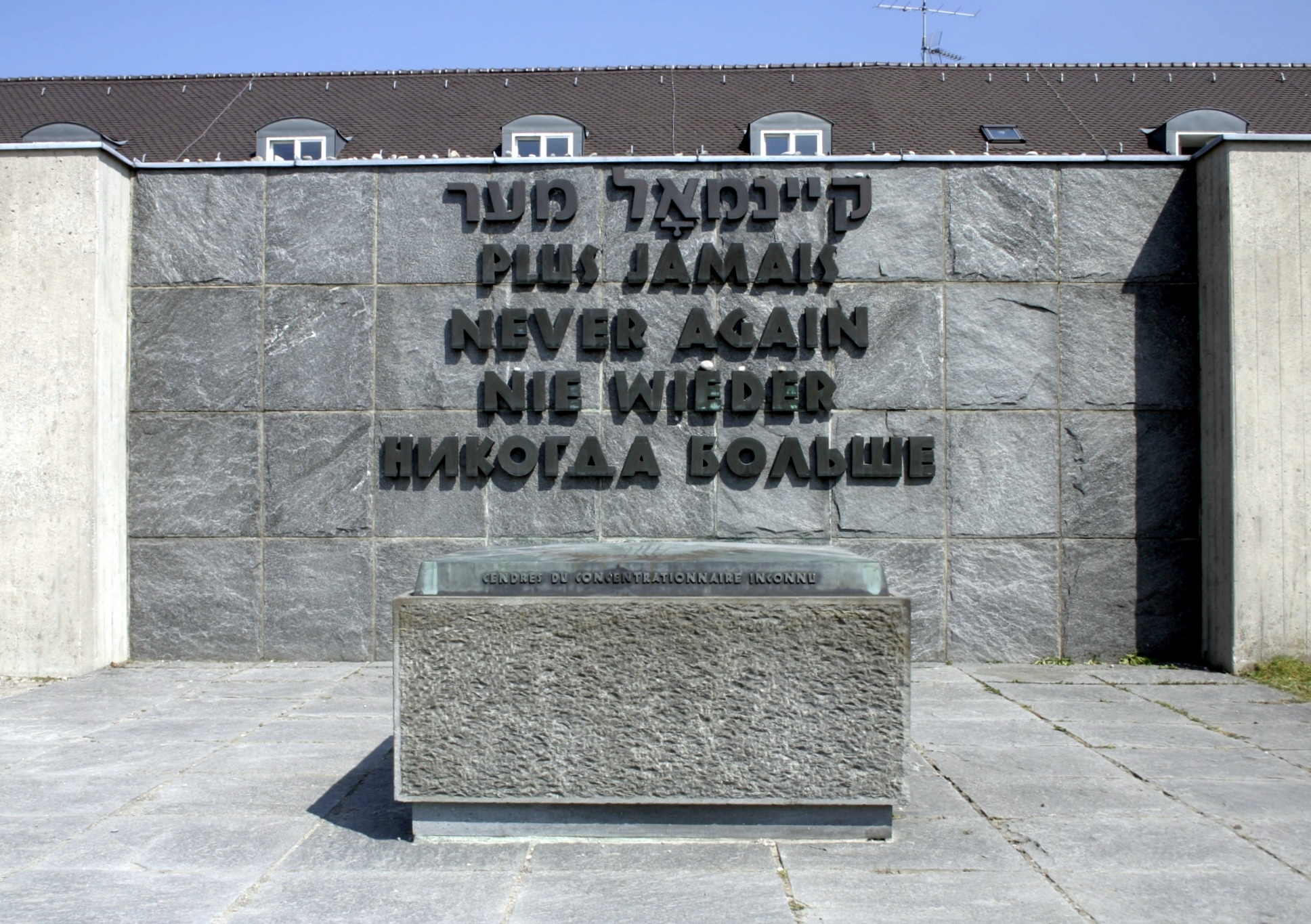
A memorial at the camp with Never again written in several languages

- Léon Blum – briefly, having been evacuated from Buchenwald concentration camp
- Jan Buzek, murdered in November 1940
- Theodor Duesterberg, briefly imprisoned in 1934
- Leopold Figl, arrested 1938, released 8 May 1943
- Andrej Gosar, Slovenian politician and political theorist, arrested in 1944
- Karl Haushofer
- Miklós Horthy Jr.
- Alois Hundhammer, arrested 21 June 1933, freed 6 July 1933
- Miklós Kállay
- Franz Olah, arrested in 1938 and transported on the first train of Austrian prisoners to Dachau.
- Hjalmar Schacht, arrested 1944, liberated April 1945
- Richard Schmitz
- Kurt Schumacher, in Dachau since July 1935, sent to Flossenbürg concentration camp in 1939, returned to Dachau in 1940, released due to extreme illness 16 March 1943
- Kurt Schuschnigg, the last fascist chancellor of Austria before the Austrian Nazi Party was installed by Hitler, shortly before the Anschluss
- Stefan Starzyński, the Mayor of Warsaw, probably murdered in Dachau in 1943
- Petr Zenkl, Czech national socialist politician

== Resistance fighters and foreign agents ==
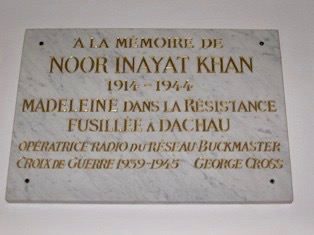
Inayat Khan's memorial plaque at the Dachau Memorial Hall

- Yolande Beekman, Special Operations Executive agent, murdered 13 September 1944
- Georges Charpak, who in 1992 received the Nobel Prize in Physics
- Madeleine Damerment, Special Operations Executive agent, murdered 13 September 1944
- Charles Delestraint, French general and leader of French resistance; executed by Gestapo in 1945
- Johann Georg Elser, who tried to assassinate Hitler in 1939, murdered 9 April 1945
- Arthur Haulot
- Suzy van Hall, Dutch dancer, member of the Dutch Resistance; liberated in 1945
- Noor Inayat Khan GC, Special Operations Executive agent of Indian origin, served as a clandestine radio operator in Paris, murdered 13 September 1944 when she and her SOE colleagues were shot in the back of the head
- George Maduro, Dutch law student and cavalry officer posthumously awarded the medal of Knight 4th-class of the Military Order of William.
- Kurt Nehrling, murdered in 1943
- Eliane Plewman, Special Operations Executive agent, murdered 13 September 1944
- Enzo Sereni, Special Operations Executive agent, Jewish, son of King Victor Emmanuele's personal physician. Parachuted into Nazi-occupied Italy, captured by the Germans and executed in November 1944. Kibbutz Netzer Sereni in Israel is named after him.
- Jean ("Johnny") Voste, the one documented black prisoner, was a Belgian resistance fighter from the Belgian Congo; he was arrested in 1942 for alleged sabotage and was one of the survivors of Dachau

== Royalty ==
- Antonia, Crown Princess of Bavaria, daughter Irmingard, step-son Albrecht and Albrecht's sons Franz and Max
- Grand Duchess Kira Kirillovna of Russia and her husband Prince Louis Ferdinand of Prussia
- Prince Friedrich Leopold of Prussia
- Philipp, Landgrave of Hesse, after falling out of Hitler's favor
- Maximilian, Duke of Hohenberg and his brother Prince Ernst von Hohenberg
- Prince Xavier of Bourbon-Parma

== Scientists ==
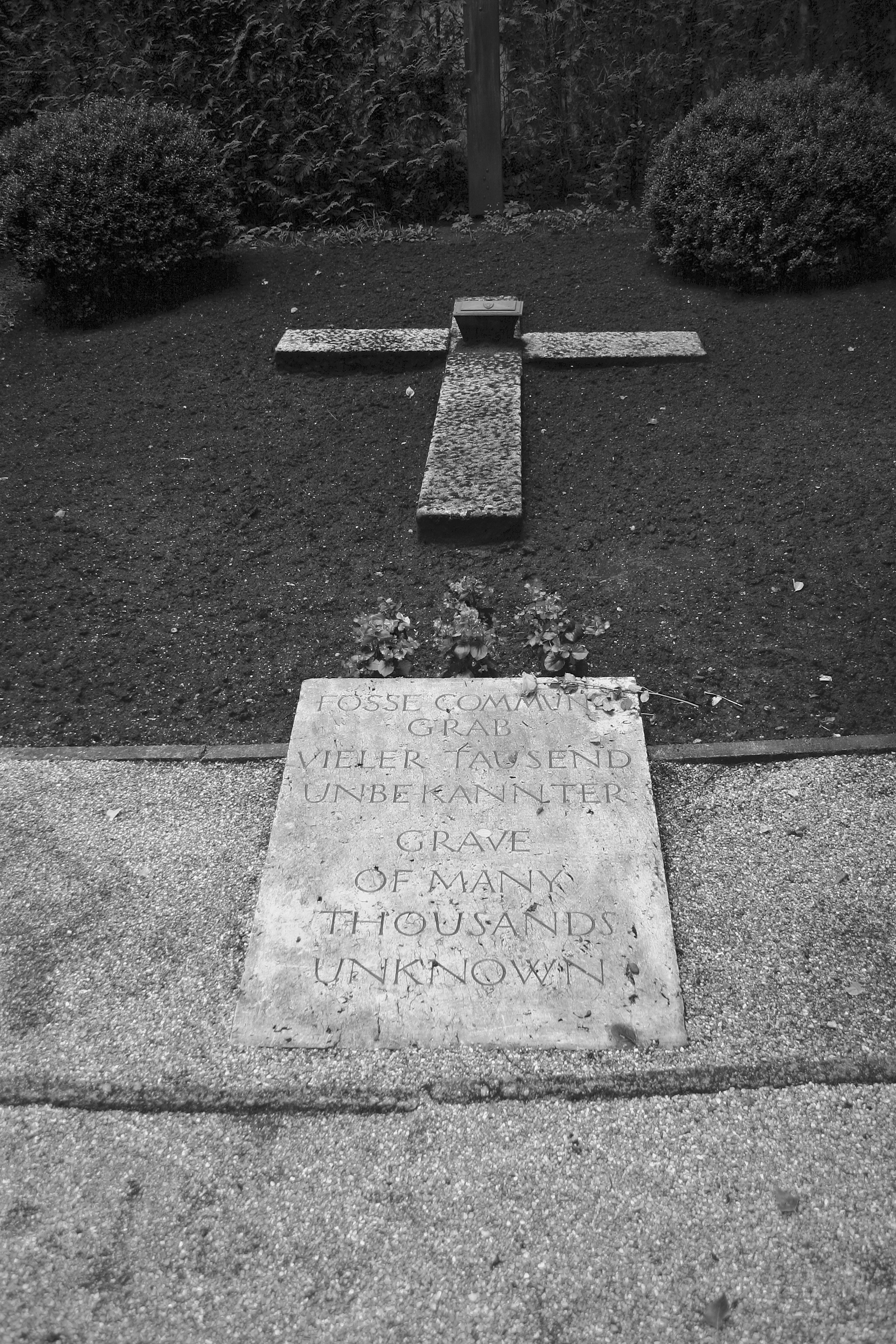
The commemorative mass grave dedicated to the unknown dead at Dachau

Among many others, 183 professors and lower university staff from Kraków universities, arrested on 6 November 1939 during Sonderaktion Krakau.

== Writers ==
- Fran Albreht, Slovenian poet
- Robert Antelme, French writer
- Raoul Auernheimer, writer, in Dachau 4 months
- Tadeusz Borowski, writer, survived, but committed suicide in 1951
- Adolf Fierla, Polish poet
- Viktor Frankl, an Austrian psychiatrist and writer
- Fritz Gerlich, a German journalist
- Stanisław Grzesiuk, Polish writer, poet and singer, in Dachau from 4 April 1940, later transferred to Mauthausen
- Heinrich Eduard Jacob, German writer, in Dachau 6 months in 1938, transferred to Buchenwald
- Stefan Kieniewicz, Polish historian
- Juš Kozak, Slovenian playwright
- Friedrich Marby, German occult writer
- Gustaw Morcinek, Polish writer
- Boris Pahor, Slovenian writer
- Karol Piegza, Polish writer, teacher and folklorist
- Gustaw Przeczek, Polish writer and teacher
- Friedrich Reck-Malleczewen, German writer
- Franz Roh, German art critic and art historian, for a few months in 1933
- Jura Soyfer, writer, in Dachau 6 months in 1938, transferred to Buchenwald
- Adam Wawrosz, Polish poet and writer
- Stanisław Wygodzki, Polish writer
- Stevo Žigon (number: 61185), Serbian actor, theatre director, and writer, in Dachau from December 1943 to May 1945

== Military ==
- Konstantinos Bakopoulos, Greek general
- Bogislaw von Bonin, Wehrmacht officer, opponent
- Franz Halder, former Chief of German Army General Staff
- Georgios Kosmas, Greek general
- Alexandros Papagos, commander-in-chief of the Greek Army in 1940–41, future Prime Minister of Greece
- Ernest Peterlin, Slovenian military officer
- Ioannis Pitsikas, Greek general
- Karl Chmielewski, former SS Officer, tried for stealing diamonds from inmates while commandant of Gusen concentration camp.
- Alexander von Falkenhausen, German general who resisted Hitler

== Others ==
- Jan Ertmański, Polish boxer who competed in the 1924 Summer Olympics
- Brother Theodore, comedian
- Bruno Franz Kaulbach, Austrian lawyer
- Rosemarie Koczy, German artist
- Zoran Mušič, Slovenian painter
- Ona Šimaitė, Lithuanian librarian
- Tullio Tamburini, Italian police chief
- Fritz Thyssen, businessman and early supporter of Hitler, later an opponent
- Morris Weinrib, father of Rush singer, bassist, keyboardist Geddy Lee
- Władysław Dworaczek, Polish educator
