= List of Mauthausen-Gusen inmates =

This is an incomplete list of notable inmates who were held at the Mauthausen-Gusen concentration camp.

== Inmates ==
- Aart Alblas, Dutch navy officer, resistance member and Engelandvaarder (Mauthausen)
- Liddy Bacroff, transgender performer and sex worker
- György Bálint (originally surname Braun; 1919–2020), Hungarian horticulturist, Candidate of Agricultural Sciences, journalist, author, and politician who served as an MP.
- Otakar Batlička, journalist and member of the Czech resistance, radio amateur and illegal radio operator
- Antonio García Barón, Spanish anarchist who fought with the Durruti Column (Mauthausen)
- Francisco Boix, Spanish republican and photographer (he smuggled out 2,000 photos of the camp taken by the SS)
- Marcelino Bilbao Bilbao, Spanish anarchist
- Lucien Bunel - Père Jacques de Jesus, French Carmelite friar (Louis Malle dedicated to him his movie "Au revoir, les enfants") (Gusen)
- Jan Buzek, Polish politician from Czechoslovakia
- José Cabrero Arnal, Spanish-French cartoonist
- Marcel Callo, French activist of JOC beatified by Pope John Paul II (Gusen)
- Aldo Carpi, Italian artist and university professor; author of memoirs covering his stay in Mauthausen and Gusen I (Gusen)
- Jean Cayrol, French writer and poet (Gusen)
- Józef Cebula, Catholic priest and martyr, beatified by Pope John Paul II
- Cornelis Compter, Dutch weightlifter
- René Cogny, French soldier
- Józef Cyrankiewicz, Polish Prime Minister (1947–1952 and 1956–1970)
- Józef Czempiel, Polish Catholic priest and martyr, beatified
- Antoni Czortek, Polish boxer
- Franz Dahlem, East German politician
- Stanisław Dobosiewicz, Polish writer (Gusen)
- Svetolik Dragačevac, Serbian retiree arrested for typing a threatening letter personally addressed to Adolf Hitler
- Władysław Dworaczek, Polish educator
- Anthony Faramus, British actor
- Adolf Fierla, Polish poet and writer
- Leopold Figl, Austrian Chancellor (1945–1953) and Foreign Minister (1953–1959)
- Stefan Filipkiewicz, Polish painter
- Éva Földes, Hungarian author
- Roman Frister, Polish journalist
- János Garay, Hungarian fencer
- Oszkár Gerde, Hungarian fencer
- Bernard Gotfryd, Polish photographer
- Johann Gruber, Austrian Catholic priest and resistance fighter (nicknamed: "Papa Gruber" or "The Saint of Gusen") (Gusen)
- Stanisław Grzesiuk, Polish poet and singer, author of Pięć lat kacetu ("Five Years of KZ") (Gusen)
- Israel Gutman, Polish historian
- Győző Haberfeld, Hungarian gymnast
- Karel Hašler, Czech actor, songwriter and singer
- Oldřich Pechal, Czech soldier and resistance operative
- Roger Heim, French member of Académie française (Gusen)
- Pierre Jeanpierre, French soldier and resistance member
- Jan Jesenský Jr., Czech scientist
- János Kádár, later Prime Minister of Hungary, escaped being transferred to Mauthausen
- Iakovos Kambanelis, Greek writer
- Aleksandr Nikitovich Karasyov, Russian Soviet Air Force officer
- Dmitry Karbyshev, Russian general
- Jerzy Kaźmirkiewicz, Polish scientist
- Wilhelm Kling, German communist
- Bruno Leuschner, East German politician
- Artur London, Czech politician
- Witold Dzierżykraj-Morawski, a Colonel of the Polish Army, posthumously promoted to the rank of General
- Raoul Minot (1893–1945), French amateur photographer; survived
- Gilbert Norman, SOE agent
- Antonín Novotný, President of Czechoslovakia (1957–1968)
- Gottfried Ochshorn, member of the French Resistance
- Bernard Offen
- Jan Stanisław Olbrycht, Polish lawyer and university professor
- David Olère, Polish artist
- Jean Origer, Luxembourgian cleric and director of the Luxemburger Wort
- Wiktor Ormicki, Polish geographer and university professor (Gusen)
- Giuseppe Pagano, Italian architect
- Vincenzo Pappalettera, Italian young antifascist in 1967 published Tu passerai per il camino ("You are going to pass through the chimney"), an account of Mauthausen's tortures
- František Pecháček, Czech gymnast
- Peter van Pels, known as Peter van Daan in the diary of Anne Frank, one of seven other Jews to hide with her in Amsterdam.
- Otto Peltzer, German middle distance runner
- Karol Piegza, Polish writer, teacher and folklorist
- Avgust Pirjevec, Slovenian literary historian (Gusen)
- Ivan Potrč, Slovenian writer and playwright
- Kazimierz Prószyński, Polish inventor and pioneer of film making
- Gustaw Przeczek, Polish writer and teacher
- Heinrich Rau, East German politician
- Tibor Rubin, Hungarian-born American soldier
- Bernat Rosner, Hungarian lawyer
- William Salcer, Czech inventor
- Henryk Sławik, Polish diplomat who saved over 5,000 Jews during the war (Gusen)
- Karol Śliwka, Polish politician from Czechoslovakia
- Ota Šik, Czech economist and politician
- Mike Staner, Polish author
- Stanisław Staszewski, Polish architect and poet
- Brian Stonehouse, British painter and SOE member
- Itzchak Tarkay, Austrian-born Israeli painter
- Grzegorz Timofiejew, Polish poet
- Štěpán Trochta, Czech priest
- Eduard Urx, Czechoslovak communist
- Nikolai Vlasov, Soviet pilot, prisoner of war, and underground resistance organizer
- Prežihov Voranc, Slovenian writer and Communist activist
- Simon Wiesenthal, hunter of Nazi war criminals and author of several books, including two on the camp
- Artur Woźniak, Polish footballer
