= Lutyně =

Lutyně may refer to several locations in the Czech Republic:

- Dolní Lutyně, municipality in Karviná District, Moravian-Silesian Region
- Lutyně (Orlová), part of the town of Orlová, Karviná District, Moravian-Silesian Region
