= Dobosiewicz =

Dobosiewicz is a Polish surname. Notable people with the surname include:

- Erika Dobosiewicz (1967–2023), Polish born violinist
- Stanisław Dobosiewicz (1910–2007), Polish writer and school teacher
