= Poruba (Orlová) =

- Municipal part of Orlová
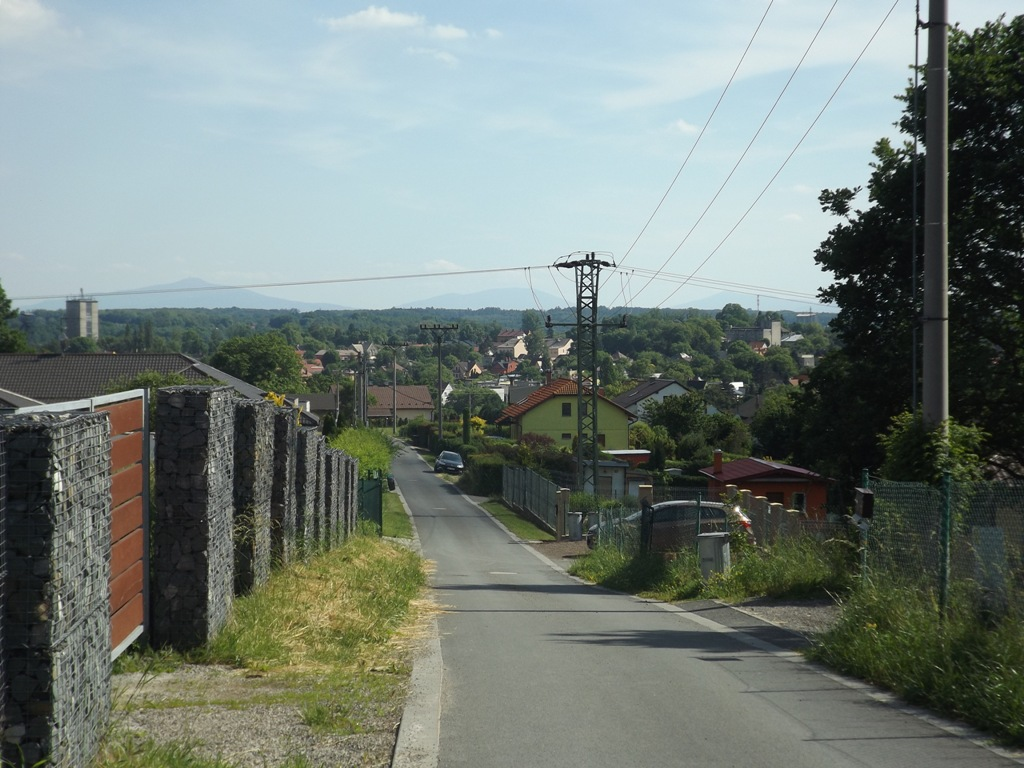
- Přespolní street
- Interactive map of Poruba
- Coordinates: 49°51′20″N 18°24′50″E
- Country: Czech Republic
- Region: Moravian-Silesian
- District: Karviná
- Municipality: Orlová

Area
  - Total: 5.63 km^{2} (2.17 sq mi)

Population (2021)
  - Total: 5,278
  - Density: 937/km^{2} (2,430/sq mi)
- Time zone: UTC+1 (CET)
  - Summer (DST): UTC+2 (CEST)
- Postal code: 735 14

Poruba (Polish: Poręba) is a municipal part of Orlová in the Karviná District of Moravian-Silesian Region of Czech Republic. It was a separate municipality but became a part of Orlová in 1946. It has about 5,000 inhabitants.

== Etymology ==
The name, both in Czech and Polish, is a common Slavic name denoting an area cleared by clearcutting of trees.

== History ==
The village could have been founded by Benedictine monks from an Orlová abbey and was first mentioned in 1447 as Porombka. Politically the village belonged to the Duchy of Teschen, which was since 1327 a fee of the Kingdom of Bohemia, which after 1526 became a part of the Habsburg monarchy.

After the Revolutions of 1848 in the Austrian Empire, a modern municipal division was introduced in the re-established Austrian Silesia. The village as a municipality was subscribed at least since 1880 to political district and legal district of Freistadt.

According to the censuses conducted in 1880, 1890, 1900 and 1910 the population of the municipality grew from 811 in 1880 to 2,753 in 1910. In terms of the language spoken colloquially the majority were Polish-speakers (dropping in percentage from 97.6% in 1880 to 94% in 1900, and then more pronouncly to 59.5% in 1910), accompanied by Czech-speakers (growing from 1.2% in 1880 to 38.9% in 1910) and German-speakers (at most 1.8% in 1900). In terms of religion, in 1910 the majority were Roman Catholics (2,477 or 90%), followed by Protestants (231 or 8.4%%), Jews (33 or 1.2%) and others (12 or 0.4%). The village was also traditionally inhabited by Silesian Lachs, speaking Cieszyn Silesian dialect, additionally industrial growth in the environs lured a large influx of migrant workers, mostly from western Galicia.

After World War I, the fall of Austria-Hungary, the Polish–Czechoslovak War and the division of Cieszyn Silesia in 1920, the village became a part of Czechoslovakia. Following the Munich Agreement, in October 1938 together with the Zaolzie region it was annexed by Poland, administratively organised in Frysztat County of Silesian Voivodeship. The village was then annexed by Nazi Germany at the beginning of World War II. After the war it was restored to Czechoslovakia.

== Demographics ==
Historical population

Year	Pop.	±%
1869	607	—
1880	811	+33.6%
1890	1,000	+23.3%
1900	1,626	+62.6%
1910	2,753	+69.3%

Year	Pop.	±%
1921	3,494	+26.9%
1930	4,247	+21.6%
1950	4,432	+4.4%
1961	6,490	+46.4%
1970	6,563	+1.1%

Year	Pop.	±%
1980	6,174	−5.9%
1991	5,538	−10.3%
2001	5,542	+0.1%
2011	5,473	−1.2%
2021	5,278	−3.6%

Source: Censuses

== See also ==
- Polish minority in the Czech Republic
- Zaolzie
