= Karl Geiler =

German jurist, politician (1878–1953)

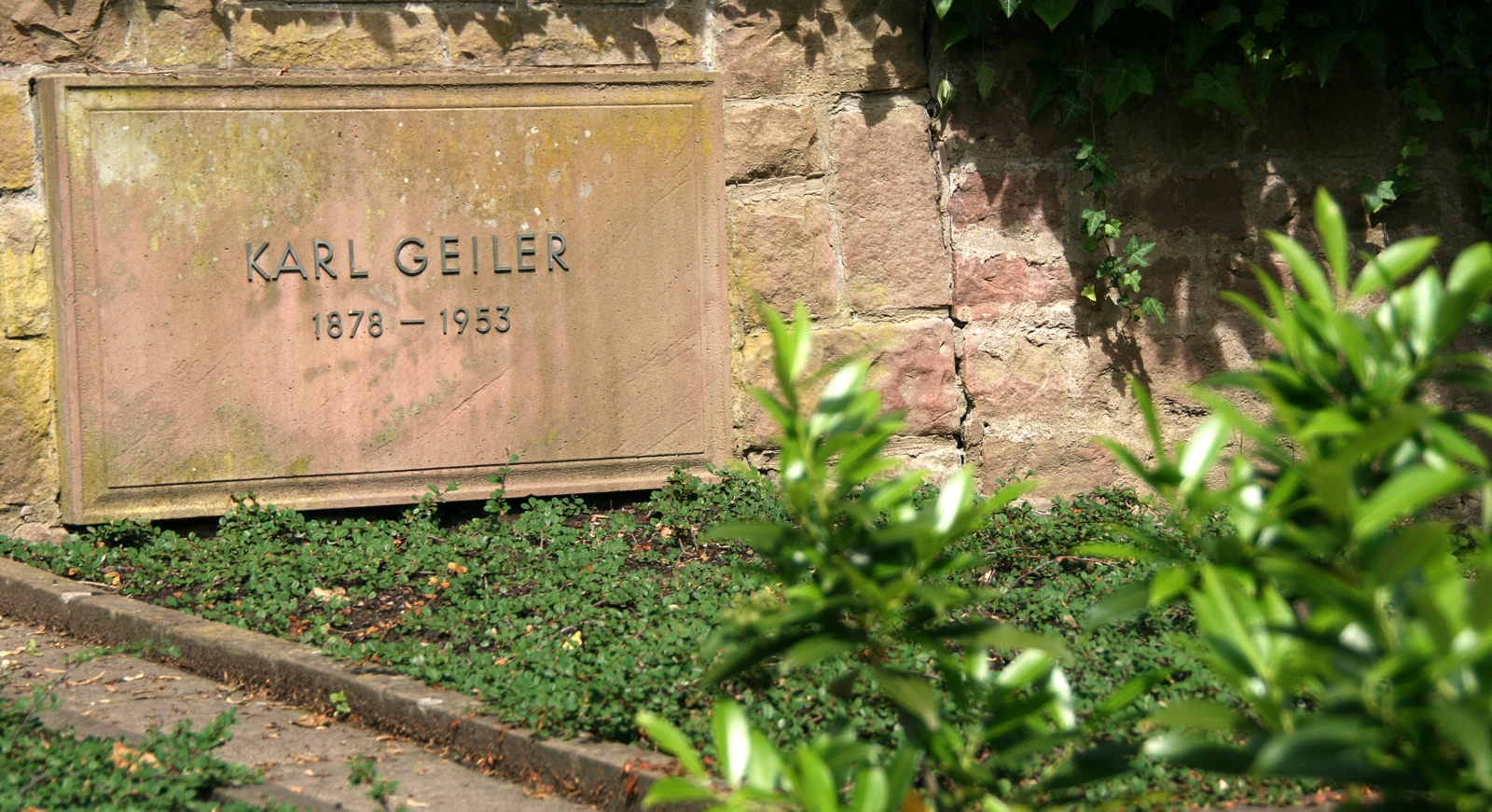
Grave of Geiler in Heidelberg

Karl Hermann Friedrich Geiler (10 August 1878 – 14 September 1953) was a German lawyer and politician. He was born in Schönau (Baden) and died in Heidelberg.

Geiler, a university professor of economic law in Heidelberg and without affiliation to a political party at the time (during the Weimar Republic, he was a member of the German Democratic Party), was installed prime minister of the newly created territory Greater Hesse by the US military administration. He replaced the social democrate Ludwig Bergsträsser, who served as acting minister-president for only one month, and would remain in office until a successor could be democratically elected. His term, from 12 October 1945 to 20 December 1946, saw the first local elections after World War II in January 1946, the vote on the constitution of Hesse and the first election of the Landtag of Hesse in December 1946.

Geiler was fiercely opposed to denazification.
