= Oskar Müller =

German politician (1896–1970)

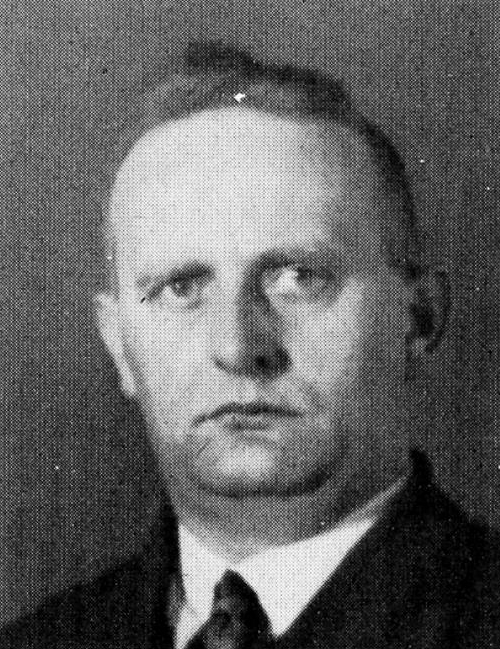
Müller c. 1932

Oskar Müller (25 June 1896 – 14 January 1970) was a German politician who was the first employment minister in Hesse after World War II.

== Early career ==
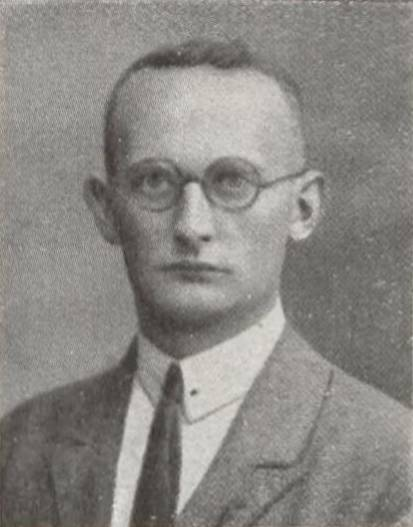
Müller c. 1924

Müller was born in Wohlau in Prussian Silesia as the son of a farmer. He fought in World War I and became an officer. After the war, he joined the Communist Party of Germany (KPD). Later, he was selected into the Prussian federal state parliament, to which he belonged until 1933. Beginning in 1928 Müller worked several years as an organization leader of the KPD in Hesse.

== World War II ==
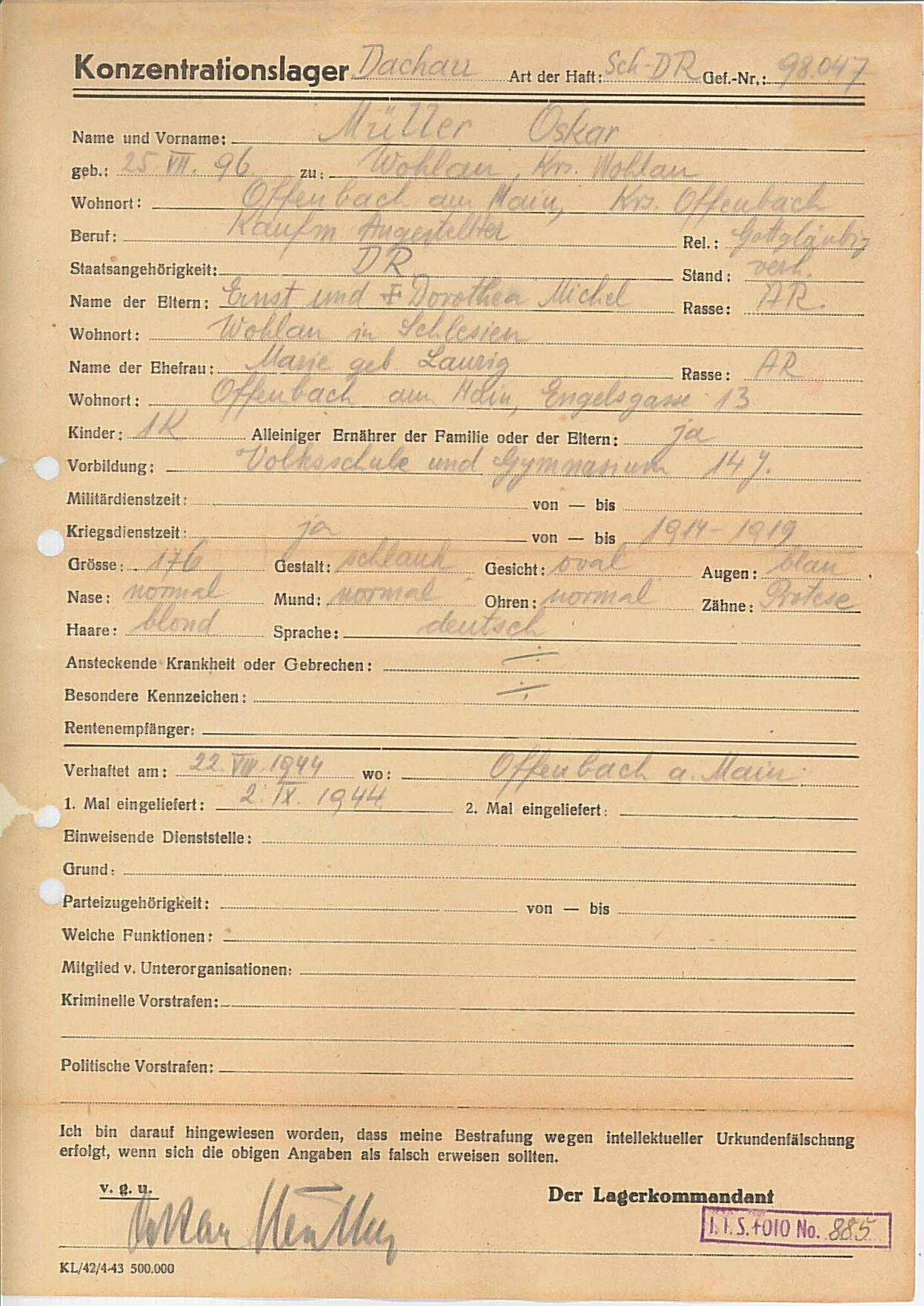
Registration form of Oskar Müller as a prisoner at Dachau Nazi Concentration Camp

When the Nazi Party came to power, Müller was declared one of their enemies. On 22 November 1933 the Gestapo arrested him. He spent three years in a penitentiary and was held until 1939 at Sachsenhausen. From June 1939 by August 1944 he found accommodation in the Offenbacher leather industry as an employee. In August 1944, he was again arrested for resisting the Nazis and imprisoned at Dachau.

== Post-war years ==
Although detention in the concentration camps had weakened Müller's health, he eagerly assisted in the reconstruction of Germany. In October 1945 he became a minister for work and welfare under Prime Minister Karl Geiler, but was replaced in 1947.

Müller concentrated on party work. In 1948, he again became a regional chairman of the KPD. In 1949 he was laid off, but remained part of the party executive committee of the KPD.

From 1949–1953 Müller belonged to the German Bundestag. He was briefly arrested in 1953. Since that time he worked as one of the presidents and as a Secretary-General of the anti-fascist Vereinigung der Verfolgten des Naziregimes (VVN).

Müller was a developer of the Hesse constitution, which carries his signature. Articles 41 and 42 plan the transfer of the large-scale industry in common property. Lockout was forbidden by the constitution.

After repeated consultations with trade unions, a works council law was created, in which participation in equal numbers was fully embodied. The Hessian constitution was used as a model by other states.

== See also ==
- List of Holocaust survivors
