= Cornelis Compter =

Dutch weightlifter

Personal information
- Nationality: Dutch
- Born: 16 July 1894; The Hague, Netherlands
- Died: 23 February 1945 (aged 50); Mauthausen-Gusen Concentration Camp, Nazi Germany

Sport
- Sport: Weightlifting

Cornelis Compter (16 July 1894 – 23 February 1945) was a Dutch weightlifter. He competed in the men's featherweight event at the 1928 Summer Olympics. He was killed in the Mauthausen-Gusen Concentration Camp during World War II.

== See also ==
- List of Mauthausen-Gusen inmates
