= Nehrling-Eberling resistance group =

German resistance cell

The Nehrling-Eberling resistance group was an SPD resistance group originating from Weimar, active during the National Socialist era, as well as most of the Second World War. The group was established circa 1933 by Kurt Nehrling, a local SPD politician, before later involving local SPD secretary Hanz Eberling. The group's existence almost became known by the Gestapo after the dismantling of the New Beginnings resistance network, likewise with Nehrling's arrest. Due to the imprisonment of individual members such as the founder Nehrling, the cell was forced to temporarily cease operating. It is generally assumed that it resumed in existence throughout the remainder of the Second World War.

== Membership ==
At the time of its formation, the group primarily consisted of young members of the Social Democratic Labour Youth residing in the west of Weimar. Other former SPD members such as Hans Eberling subsequently joined, who later became leader after Nehrling's detention.

Nehrling collaborated with SPD sub-district secretary Hanz Eberling, establishing contacts with other resistance groups before forming the group towards a political circle. Other members of the group included Cläre Adler, Heinz Adler, Willy Hüttenrauch Erna Hüttenrauch, Martin Seifert, Ilse Seifert, Helmut Reichelt, Karl Köth, Erna Köth, Hans Hellmich sowie Herbert Skubatz and Margarete Schwarz.

In 1942, Nehrling was arrested for "issuing statements undermining military strength", later being executed at Dachau Concentration Camp on 22 December 1943. A stumbling stone was placed in front of his former residence at Eckenerstraße 1 in Weimar in 2008 in his memory.

== Operation ==
Shortly after the Machtergreifung, Kurt Nehrling's newly opened laundry shop served as the first regular meeting place for the cell. He had previously been a civil servant and was then forced into temporary retirement by the Nazi government for political reasons. The group later usually met within individual members' residences, at garden parties or upon rural roads. At the latter, they dramatised a broken-down bicycle. After the tyres were replaced, notes were then hidden nearby before being discovered by other members, a very popular means for discreet communication between members regularly. As Cläre Adler later reported, the SPD also had its own printing office in Erfurt where it produced its own illegal newspaper. A courier service was also set up, the main office of which is said to have been in Ronneburg.

Interactions ranging from political discussion towards illegal material being created and exchanged were routine. By 1944 the Total War policy was implemented; An influx of Jews were transported to Weimar factories to maximise production, whereby the cell participated in supportive efforts for forced labourers, as per Cläre Adler's mentions within a report.

== Associations ==
External contacts were considered very dangerous at the time, given the permanent security threat posed by the SS along with the Gestapo. Nevertheless, there was an interrelation to groups of Social Democrats across Germany in Berlin, Erfurt, Vienna, Leipzig, Nordhausen, Gera and Koblenz. Kurt Nehrling and Hanz Eberling were also found to be in contact with Jakob Greidiger, Franz Petrich, Johannes Kleinspehn as well as August Frölich and Hermann Brill.

== Literature ==
- Udo Wohlfeld, Harry Stein: Social Democrats against Hitler, The Nerling-Eberling resistance group in Weimar. History workshop Weimar/Apolda, Weimardruck, Weimar 2003, ISBN 3-935275-03-X
