= Lazy (Orlová) =

Village in the Czech Republic

Coordinates: 49°50′20″N 18°25′6″E

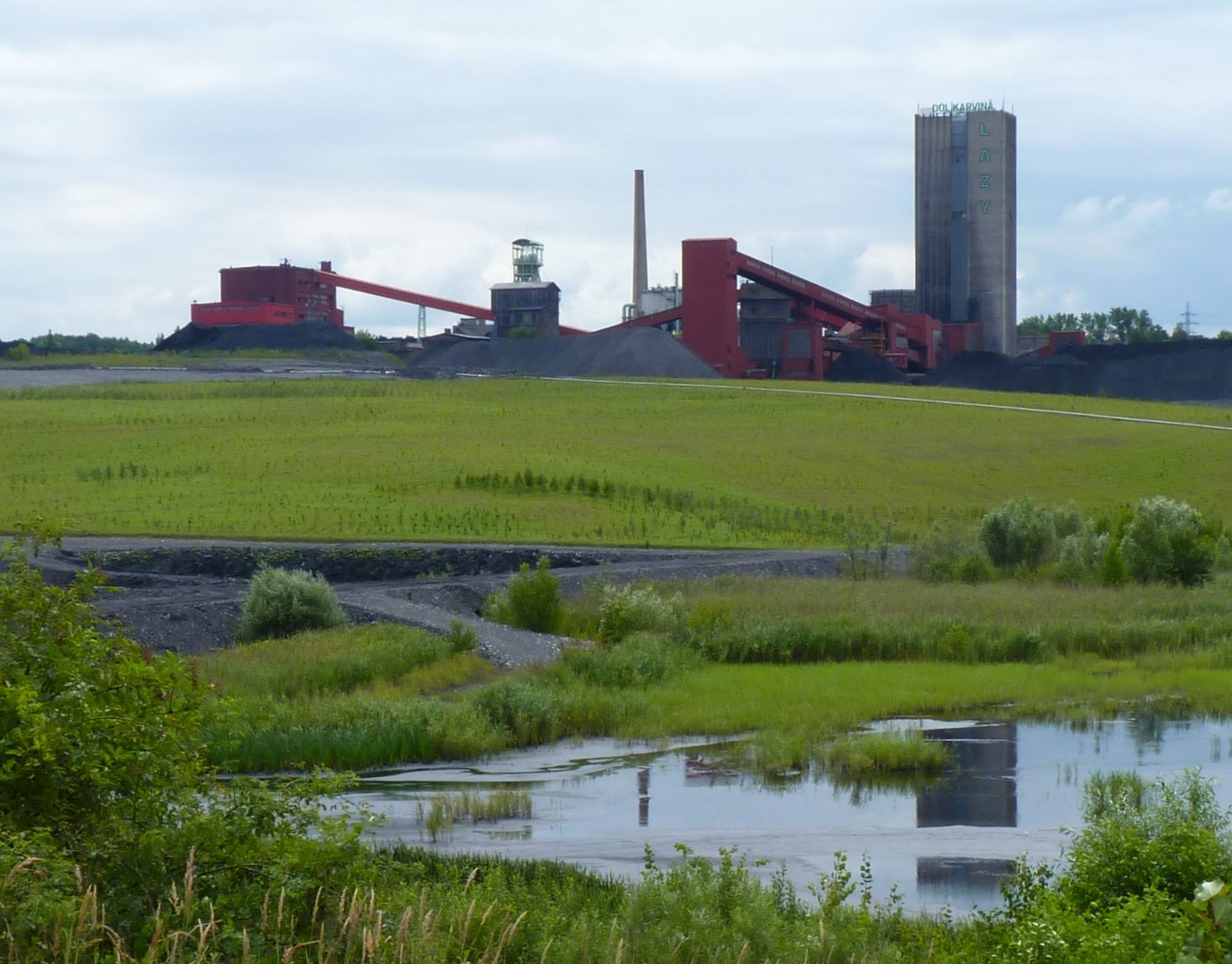
Lazy Coal Mine

Lazy (Polish: Łazy) is a village in Karviná District, Moravian-Silesian Region, Czech Republic. It was a separate municipality but became administratively a part of Orlová in 1946. It has a population of 274.

== Etymology ==
The name is cultural in origin and in Polish denotes an arable area obtained by slash-and-burn technique.

== History ==
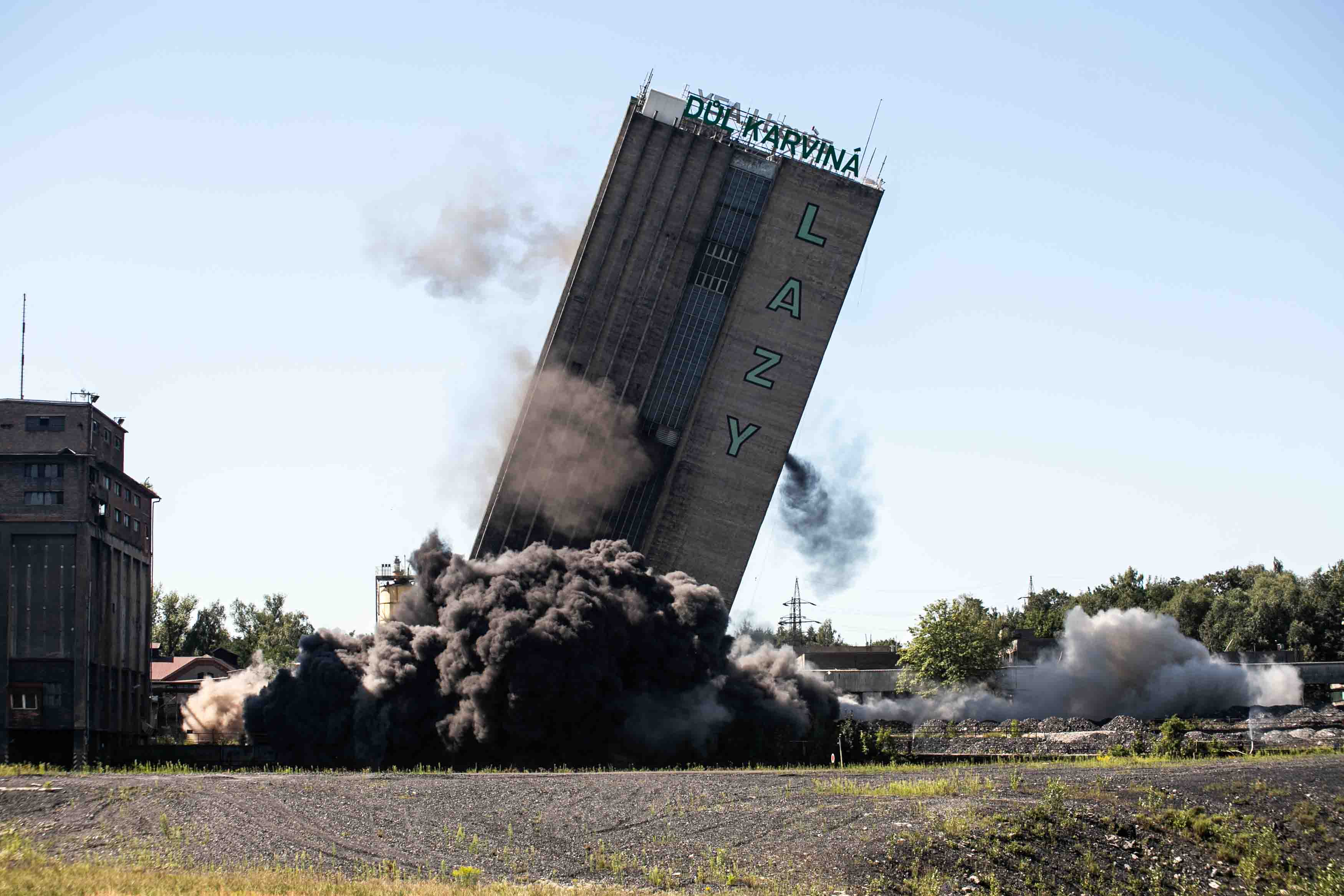
Demolition of the skip tower of the Lazy Mine on 27 July 2024

The settlement was first mentioned in a Latin document of Diocese of Wrocław called Liber fundationis episcopatus Vratislaviensis from around 1305 as item in Lazy villa Paczconis. It meant that the village was in the process of location (the size of land to pay a tithe from was not yet precise). The village could have been founded by Benedictine monks from an Orlová abbey and also it could a part of a larger settlement campaign taking place in the late 13th century on the territory of what would later be known as Upper Silesia.

Politically the village belonged initially to the Duchy of Cieszyn, formed in 1290 in the process of feudal fragmentation of Poland and was ruled by a local branch of Silesian Piast dynasty. In 1327 the duchy became a fee of the Kingdom of Bohemia, which after 1526 became part of the Habsburg monarchy.

After the Revolutions of 1848 in the Austrian Empire, a modern municipal division was introduced in the re-established Austrian Silesia. The village as a municipality was subscribed at least since 1880 to political district and legal district of Freistadt.

According to the censuses conducted in 1880, 1890, 1900 and 1910 the population of the municipality grew from 1,516 in 1880 to 7,896 in 1910. In 1880 the majority were Czech-speaking (893 or 59.7%), followed by Polish-speaking (577 or 38.6%), in 1890 it changed so that the majority became Polish-speaking (1,507 or 70.3%, and then in 1900 4,660 or 81.7%) with Czech-speaking minority (622 or 29% in 1890 and 921 or 16.1% in 1900). This again shifted in 1910, when 49% where Czech-speaking and 48.7% Polish-speaking. They were accompanied by a small German-speaking minority (between 15 or 0.7% in 1890 and 181 or 2.3% in 1910). In terms of religion, in 1910 the majority were Roman Catholics (72.4%), followed by Protestants (26%), Jews (115 or 1.5%), and others (15 or 0.1%).

After World War I, the fall of Austria-Hungary, the Polish–Czechoslovak War and the division of Cieszyn Silesia in 1920, the village became a part of Czechoslovakia. Following the Munich Agreement, in October 1938 together with the Zaolzie region it was annexed by Poland, administratively organised in Frysztat County of Silesian Voivodeship. The village was then annexed by Nazi Germany at the beginning of World War II. During the genocidal Intelligenzaktion campaign, in 1939–1940, several Polish teachers and a Polish priest were deported to concentration camps and then murdered there (see Nazi crimes against the Polish nation). The local Polish police chief and five other policemen were murdered by the Russians in the Katyn massacre in 1940. In 1943–1944, the Germans operated a forced labour camp in Lazy. After the war it was restored to Czechoslovakia.

== People ==
- Karol Piegza, Polish writer and folklorist was born here
- Gustaw Przeczek, Polish writer and teacher was born here

== See also ==
- Polish minority in the Czech Republic
- Zaolzie
