= Gustaw Przeczek =

Polish writer, poet, teacher and activist

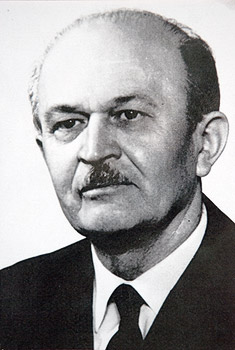
- Born: 30 May 1913; Łazy, Austria-Hungary
- Died: 21 February 1974 (aged 60); Hradec Králové, Czechoslovakia
- Citizenship: Austrian, Czechoslovak
- Occupations: Poet, writer, activist
- Writing career
- Language: Polish

Gustaw Przeczek (Polish pronunciation: [ˈɡustaf ˈpʂɛt͡ʂɛk]; 30 May 1913 – 21 February 1974) was a Polish writer, poet, teacher and activist.

== Biography ==
Przeczek was born in a large coal miner's family in the village of Lazy which lies in the coal basin. He graduated from schools in Orlová and Lazy and in 1933 from a teachers' seminary in Ostrava. Przeczek later taught as a teacher in Polish schools in Bystřice and Lazy.

During World War II he was arrested during mass arrests of Polish intelligentsia and in 1940–1945 incarcerated in Dachau and KL Gusen I concentration camp. In the latter camp Przeczek was forced to quarry granite in Gusen and Kastenhofen stone pits.

After the war he administered a Polish school in Orlová and in 1951–1970 was a director of the Polish primary school in Třinec. Przeczek leaned towards communism and in 1954–1960 was a member of the National Assembly of Czechoslovakia from the Communist Party. He was there a member of the Cultural Committee. He was also active in several cultural and literary organizations, most notably the Polish Cultural and Educational Union and its Literary-Artistic Section. Przeczek edited and contributed to Polish magazines for children Jutrzenka and Ogniwo, and wrote several textbooks for Polish schools in Czechoslovakia. He was also a member of Polish editorial staff of the Profil publishing house in Ostrava.

Przeczek wrote poetry, prose and also plays. His literary work is influenced by his incarceration in Nazi concentration camps. In KL Gusen I (Mauthausen) Przeczek met other poets, Poles Konstanty Ćwierk, Mieczysław Paszkiewicz, Grzegorz Timofiejew and Zdzisław Wróblewski; and Czech Raimund Habřina. They wrote poems on a paper from cement bags; these poems spread among inmates and were recited. Przeczek's first works after his return focused on the life in the concentration camp. He published his camp poems in 1946 in the poetry collection Serce na kolczastych drutach (Heart on the Barbed Wire), his experiences from the camp were published in 1948 in the book Kamienna Golgota (Stony Golgotha).

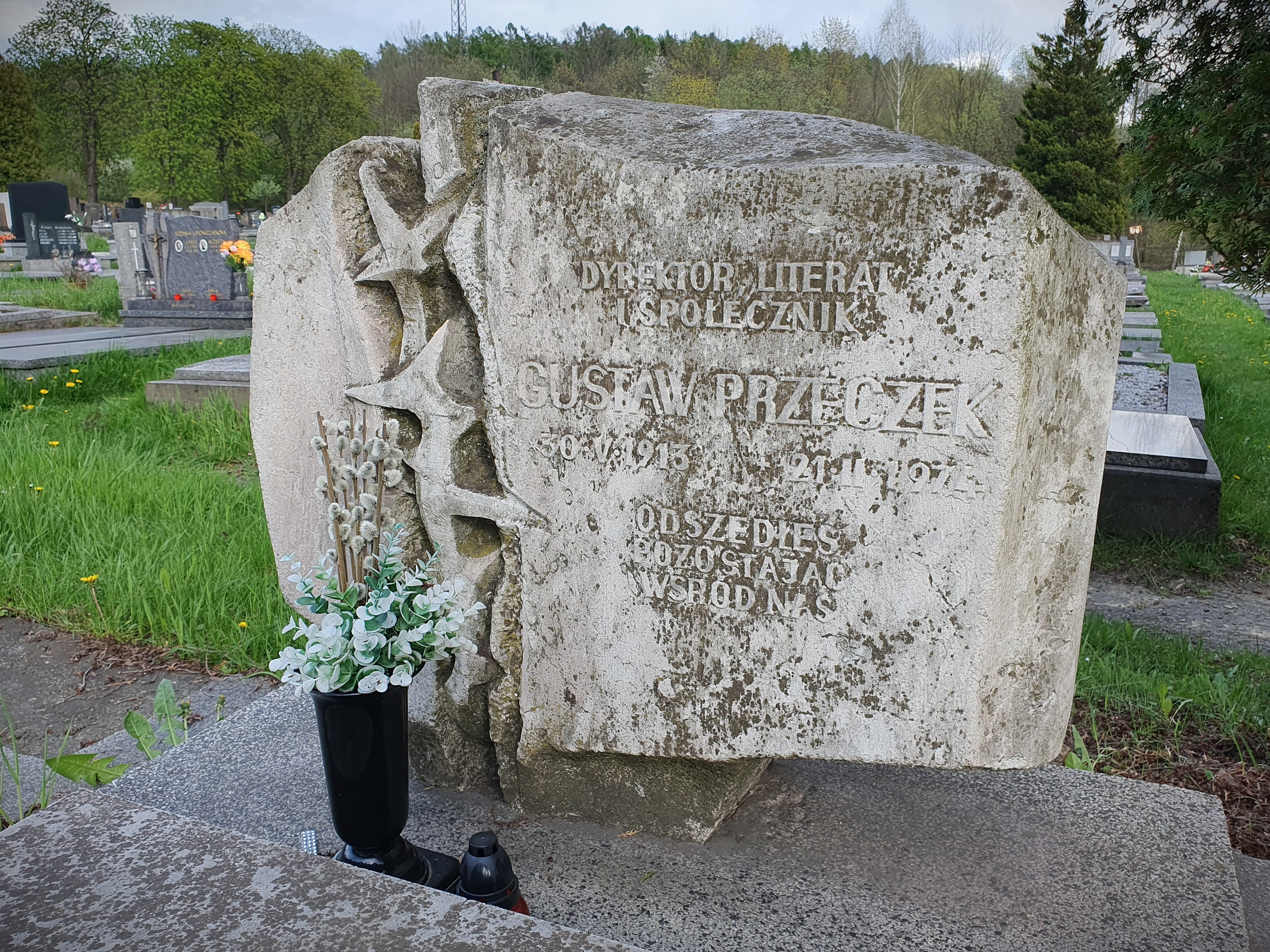
Przeczek's grave

Przeczek's motive of hard labour in the concentration camp can be observed from the fragment of Z lagrowej ulicy (From the Camp Street) poem from his poetry collection Serce na kolczastych drutach (Heart on the Barbed Wire):

The stick strikes bent over back till it bleeds,
Heavy boot kicks in the belly –
You're a dog and mean as much as a number,
Your hands, tied up with a barb wire.

You risk a horrific death daily,
Deadly gas knocks you off your feet,
You're a lost soul - in perpetual hunger
The smoke had swallowed the good God.

— Gustaw Przeczek

Gustaw Przeczek died on 21 February 1974 in a hospital in Hradec Králové during a heart operation and is buried in Třinec.

== Works ==
- Serce na kolczastych drutach (1946) – poetry collection
- Złota wolność (1947) – play
- Kamienna Golgota (1948)
- Ondraszek (1948) – play
- Powiew wolności (1948) – play
- Drogi i ścieżki (1958) – poetry collection
- Tędy szła śmierć (1969) – novel
- Odnajdywanie siebie (1976) – short stories collection
