= Jerzy Kaźmirkiewicz =

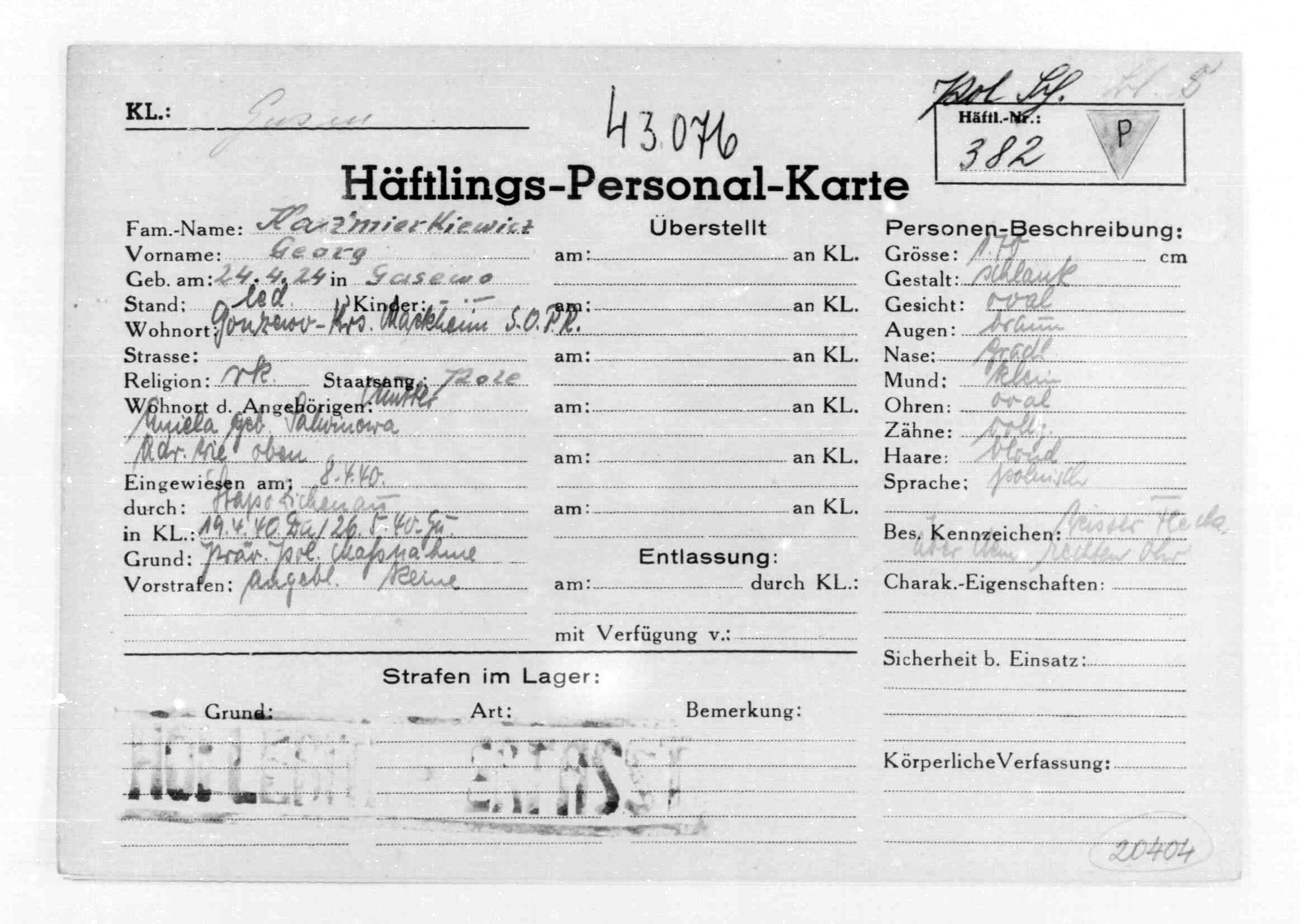
Mauthausen-Gusen concentration camp file of a Polish political prisoner No. 382, Jerzy Kaźmirkiewicz

Jerzy Kaźmirkiewicz (Polish pronunciation: [ˈjɛʐɨ kaʑmirˈkʲevit͡ʂ]; 24 April 1924 – 21 May 1977) was a Polish scientist and university professor, a specialist in wood industry at the Warsaw Agricultural University (SGGW).

== Biography ==
Kaźmirkiewicz was born 24 April 1924 in Gąsewo near Pułtusk, Poland, to a family of a teacher at the local manor. Before the war the family moved to Pułtusk, where Jerzy's father became a teacher at the local primary school. There Kaźmirkiewicz formed a Scouting troop for boys. Shortly after the outbreak of the Polish Defensive War and the German take-over of Poland, both Jerzy and his father found themselves on the proscription lists of the Gestapo. Arrested in December 1939, both were sent through Auschwitz and the Dachau concentration camp to Mauthausen-Gusen concentration camp, where they spent the entire war as political prisoners.

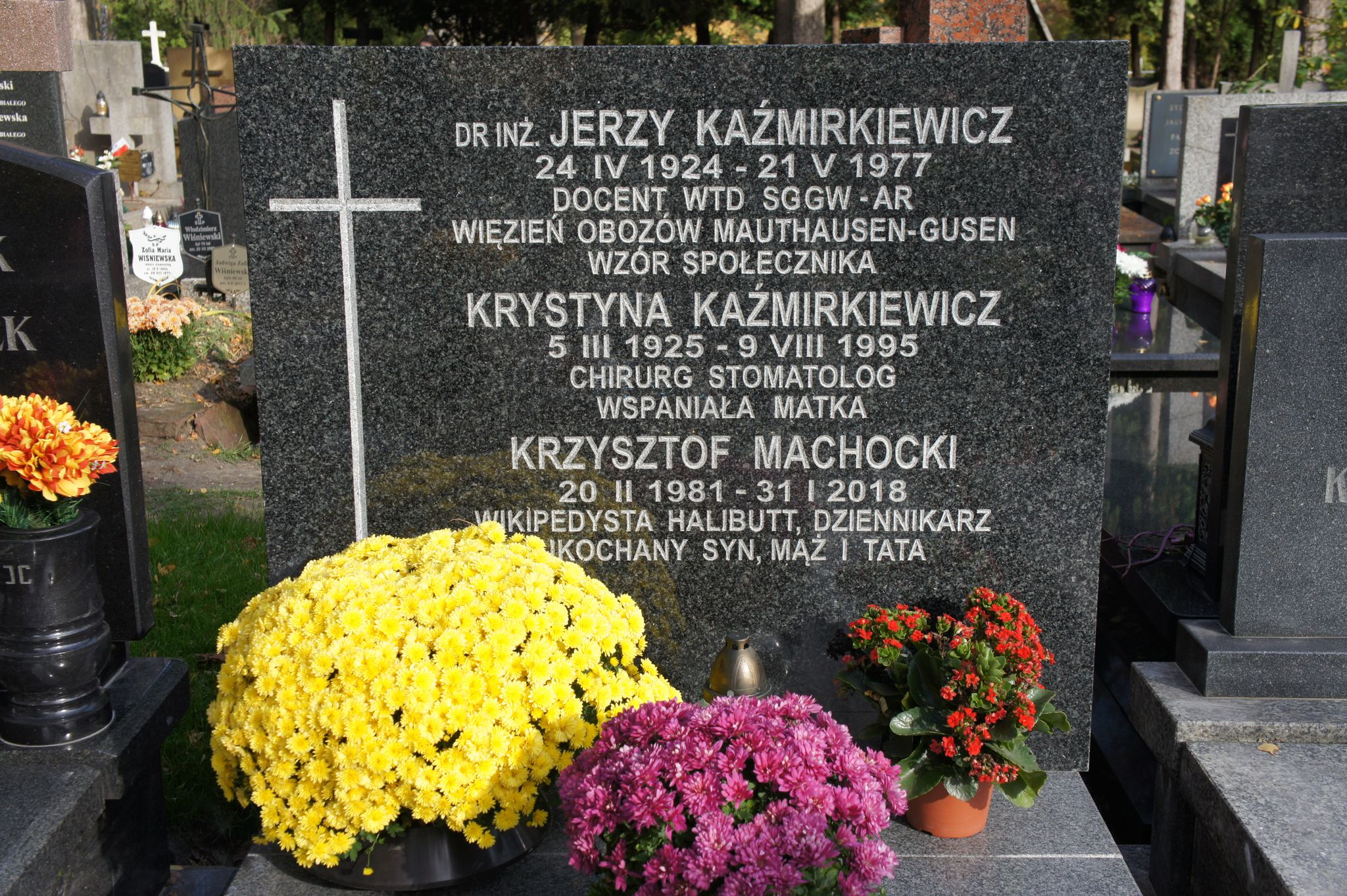
Jerzy Kaźmirkiewicz’s tombstone.

Liberated in 1945, they returned to Pułtusk, where Jerzy recreated the scouting troop in the school, now headed by his father. After his matura exam, he graduated from the Warsaw-based Main School of Agriculture and started his university career there. With the grade of docent he became the head of the Faculty of Wood Technology (WTD). One of the most notable specialists in technology of wood processing, he authored numerous works on the topic. He also became a co-founder of several wood processing plants in Poland and Yugoslavia. Apart from his university career, he was an active member of the ZBoWiD veterans organization and initiator of the construction of several neighbourhoods in the city of Warsaw financed by the university workers. He died of a stroke on 21 May 1977 and is buried at the Powązki Cemetery.
