= Constitution of Hesse =

Principles, institutions and law of political governance in the German state of Hesse

Constitution of the State of Hesse Verfassung des Landes Hessen (German)

Overview
- Jurisdiction: State of Hesse
- Subordinate to: Basic Law for the Federal Republic of Germany (since 1949)
- Created: 30 September 1949
- Ratified: 1 December 1949

The Constitution of Hesse, signed on the December 1, 1946, is the constitution of the German state of Hesse.

== Origins ==
A committee was formed for the preparation of the draft constitution and made up of 12 participants from each party. Participants of the advisory state committee (German: beratender Landesausschuss) February 26 - July 14, 1946 were, among others, Walter Fisch and Eleonore Wolf.

On June 30, 1946 elections were held for the state constitutional convention (Ger: verfassungsberatende Landesversammlung). Out of a total election turnout of 71%, the Social Democratic Party (SPD) got 44.3% of the delegates, the Christian Democratic Union (CDU) 37.3%, the Communist Party (KPD) 9.7% and the Liberal Democratic Party (LDP) got 6%.

There were 51 participants at the state constitutional convention July 15 - November 30, 1946.

Other people involved in the development of the Hesse Constitution:

- Dr. Valentin Heckert. Drafted as assistant secretary of state (Ger.: Ministerialdirektor) for the production of a draft of the new constitution. He got involved with, among other things, the democratization of the police.
- Oskar Müller, Labor Secretary (Ger.: Arbeitsminister) of the first Hesse government.
- Emil Carlebach, delegate of the first parliament and publisher of the German daily, Frankfurter Rundschau.

The state convention adopted the historic Hesse Constitutional Compromise on September 30, 1946. On December 1, 1946, the Hesse Constitution took effect by popular vote as the first German postwar constitution, with 76.4% for the entire constitution and 72% for socialization article 41.

Article 41 provided for socialization in the mining, iron and steel sectors, as well as in energy and transportation.

Other points of constitutional importance were recognition of the dignity and humanity of people; in the economic sphere, this included the right to work, the eight-hour workday, minimum 12 days of vacation, the right to strike, as well as a uniform industrial law for workers, employees and officials in which lockout is prohibited. Due to the recency of historical events under National Socialism, the social aspects of the constitution went much further than they did in constitutions adopted later on by the other Federal states in Germany.

Article 21 used to be a legal curiosity. According to it, the death penalty may be imposed for particularly grave crimes. Article 21 was changed in 2018 and its content replaced with The Death penalty is abolished so that it mirrors the Federal Constitution. Before that, Article 21 was no longer in effect due to the abolishment of the death penalty at the level of the Federal constitution. The same goes for lockout, which is unlawful according to the Hesse constitution.
