= Lutyně (Orlová) =

- Municipal part of Orlová
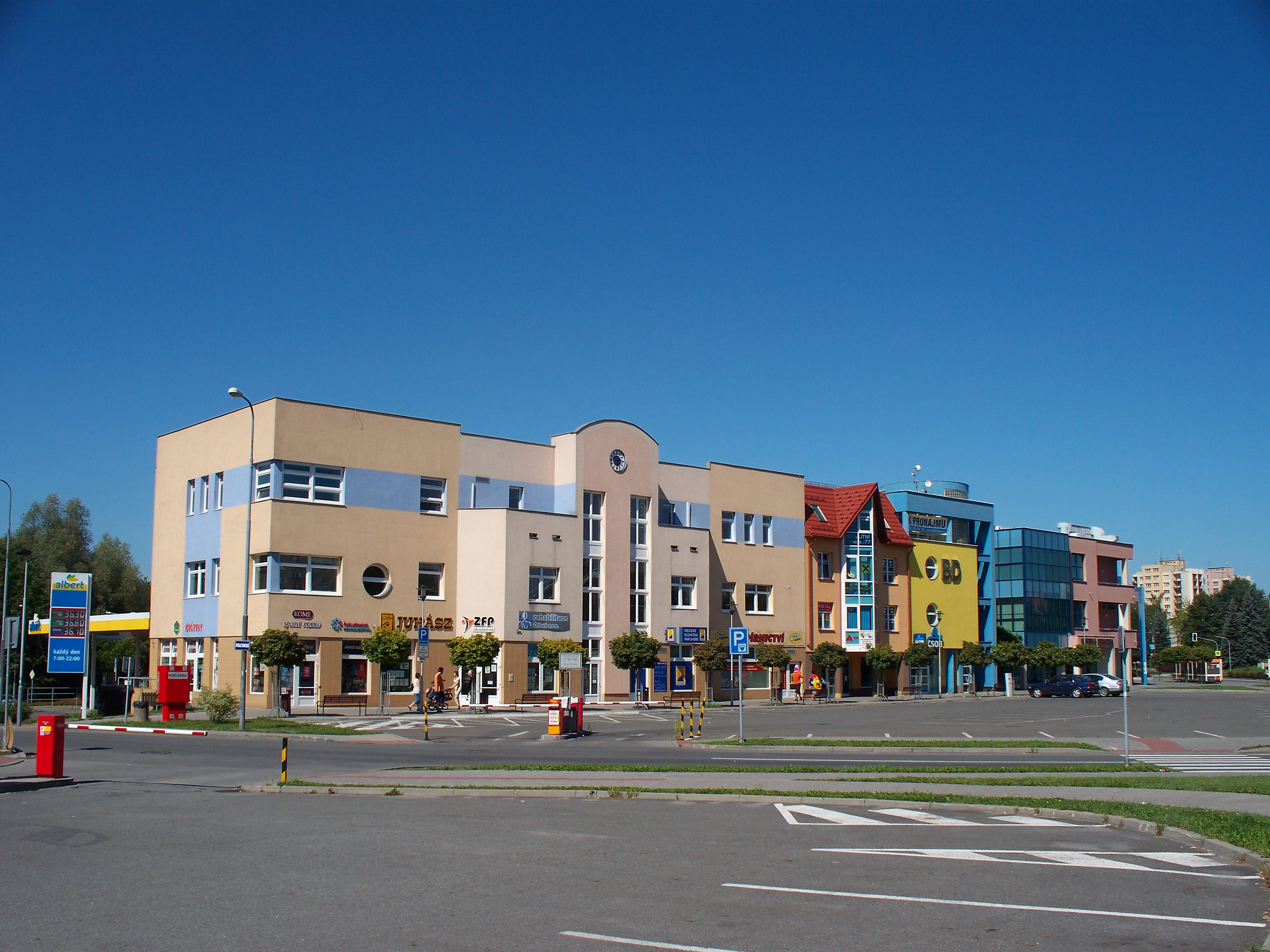
- Interactive map of Lutyně
- Coordinates: 49°52′17″N 18°25′35″E
- Country: Czech Republic
- Region: Moravian-Silesian
- District: Karviná
- Municipality: Orlová

Area
  - Total: 7.88 km^{2} (3.04 sq mi)

Population (2021)
  - Total: 20,843
  - Density: 2,650/km^{2} (6,850/sq mi)
- Time zone: UTC+1 (CET)
  - Summer (DST): UTC+2 (CEST)
- Postal code: 735 14

Lutyně (Polish: Lutynia, German: Leuten) is a municipal part of Orlová in Karviná District, Moravian-Silesian Region, Czech Republic. It was a separate municipality, historically prior to World War II known as Polská Lutyně (Polish: Lutynia Polska, German: Polnischleuten, lit. 'Polish Lutyně'), and later as Horní Lutyně (Polish: Lutynia Górna, German: Ober-Leuten, lit. 'Upper Lutyně'). It became administratively a part of Orlová in 1946, as opposed to its sister settlement of Dolní Lutyně, which remained independent. It is now the largest municipal part, with a population of about 21,000, roughly three quarters of the Orlová population.

== History ==
Housing estates in Lutyně (2025)

The village of Lutyně was first mentioned in a Latin document of Diocese of Wrocław called Liber fundationis episcopatus Vratislaviensis from around 1305 as Luthina. It meant that the village was supposed to pay tithe from 71 greater lans. The village could have been founded by Benedictine monks from Orlová abbey and also it could be a part of a larger settlement campaign taking place in the late 13th century on the territory of what will be later known as Upper Silesia. A separate village of Horní Lutyně was first mentioned in 1365, and later in 1450 together with its sister settlement as Lutynie utrumque Theutonicum et Polonicum.

Politically the villages belonged initially to the Duchy of Teschen, formed in 1290 in the process of feudal fragmentation of Poland and was ruled by a local branch of Piast dynasty. In 1327 the duchy became a fee of Kingdom of Bohemia, which after 1526 became part of the Habsburg monarchy.

After World War I, fall of Austria-Hungary, Polish–Czechoslovak War and the division of Cieszyn Silesia in 1920, the village became a part of Czechoslovakia. Following the Munich Agreement, in October 1938 together with the Zaolzie region it was annexed by Poland, administratively organised in Frysztat County of Silesian Voivodeship. The village was then annexed by Nazi Germany at the beginning of World War II and renamed to Ober-Leuten (Horní Lutyně). After the war it was restored to Czechoslovakia and in 1960 it was joined with Orlová to form a new district called Lutyně. Subsequently, it was the place where the Communists built new housing estates to lodge an increasing number of inhabitants. The district grew to become the largest in Orlová.

== Demographics ==
Historical population

Year	Pop.	±%
1869	843	—
1880	1,050	+24.6%
1890	1,200	+14.3%
1900	1,733	+44.4%
1910	2,133	+23.1%

Year	Pop.	±%
1921	2,231	+4.6%
1930	2,691	+20.6%
1950	2,403	−10.7%
1961	2,687	+11.8%
1970	9,621	+258.1%

Year	Pop.	±%
1980	17,521	+82.1%
1991	28,077	+60.2%
2001	26,577	−5.3%
2011	22,829	−14.1%
2021	20,843	−8.7%

Source: Censuses
