= Orlová =

- Town
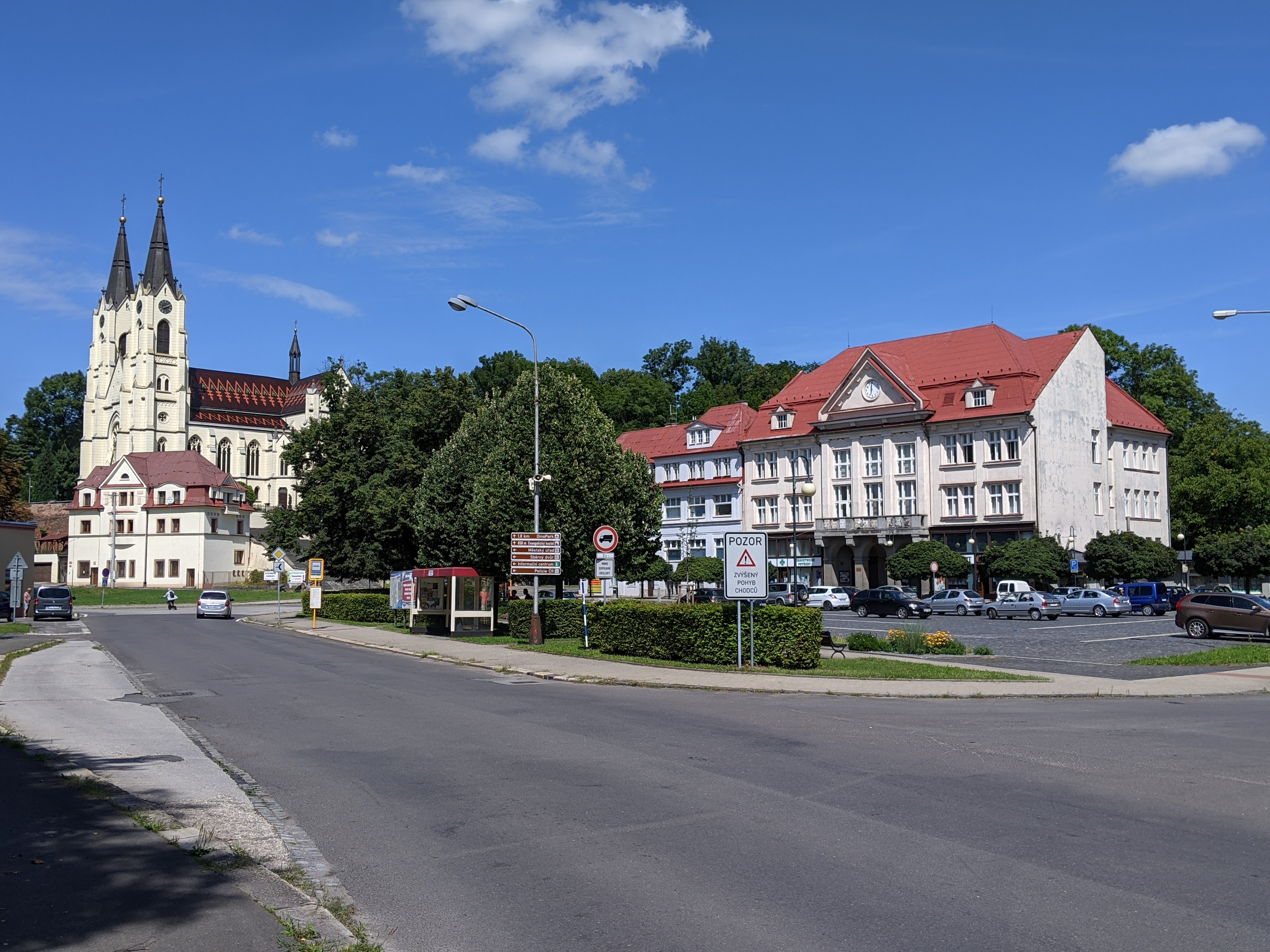
- The square Staré náměstí with the Church of the Nativity and the town hall

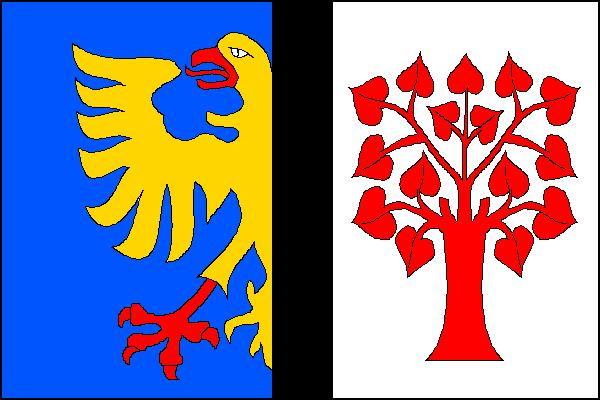
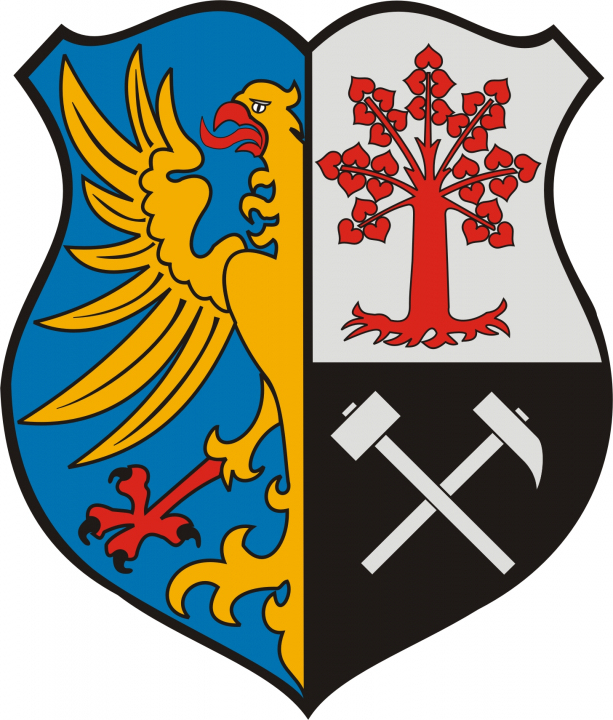
- Flag Coat of arms

- Location in the Czech Republic
- Coordinates: 49°50′43″N 18°25′49″E
- Country: Czech Republic
- Region: Moravian-Silesian
- District: Karviná
- First mentioned: 1223

Government
  - Mayor: Lenka Brzyszkowská

Area
  - Total: 24.67 km^{2} (9.53 sq mi)
- Elevation: 215 m (705 ft)

Population (2026-01-01)
  - Total: 27,383
  - Density: 1,110/km^{2} (2,875/sq mi)
- Time zone: UTC+1 (CET)
  - Summer (DST): UTC+2 (CEST)
- Postal codes: 735 11, 735 14
- Website: www.mesto-orlova.cz

Orlová (Czech pronunciation: [ˈorlovaː]; Polish: Orłowa, German: Orlau) is a town in Karviná District in the Moravian-Silesian Region of the Czech Republic. It has about 27,000 inhabitants.

During the 20th century, the town developed rapidly thanks to coal mining, but the mining also severely damaged the town. In the 21st century, the town is struggling with structural problems and high unemployment. It is infamously known as the worst town in which to live in the Czech Republic according to the national Quality of Life Index.

== Administrative division ==
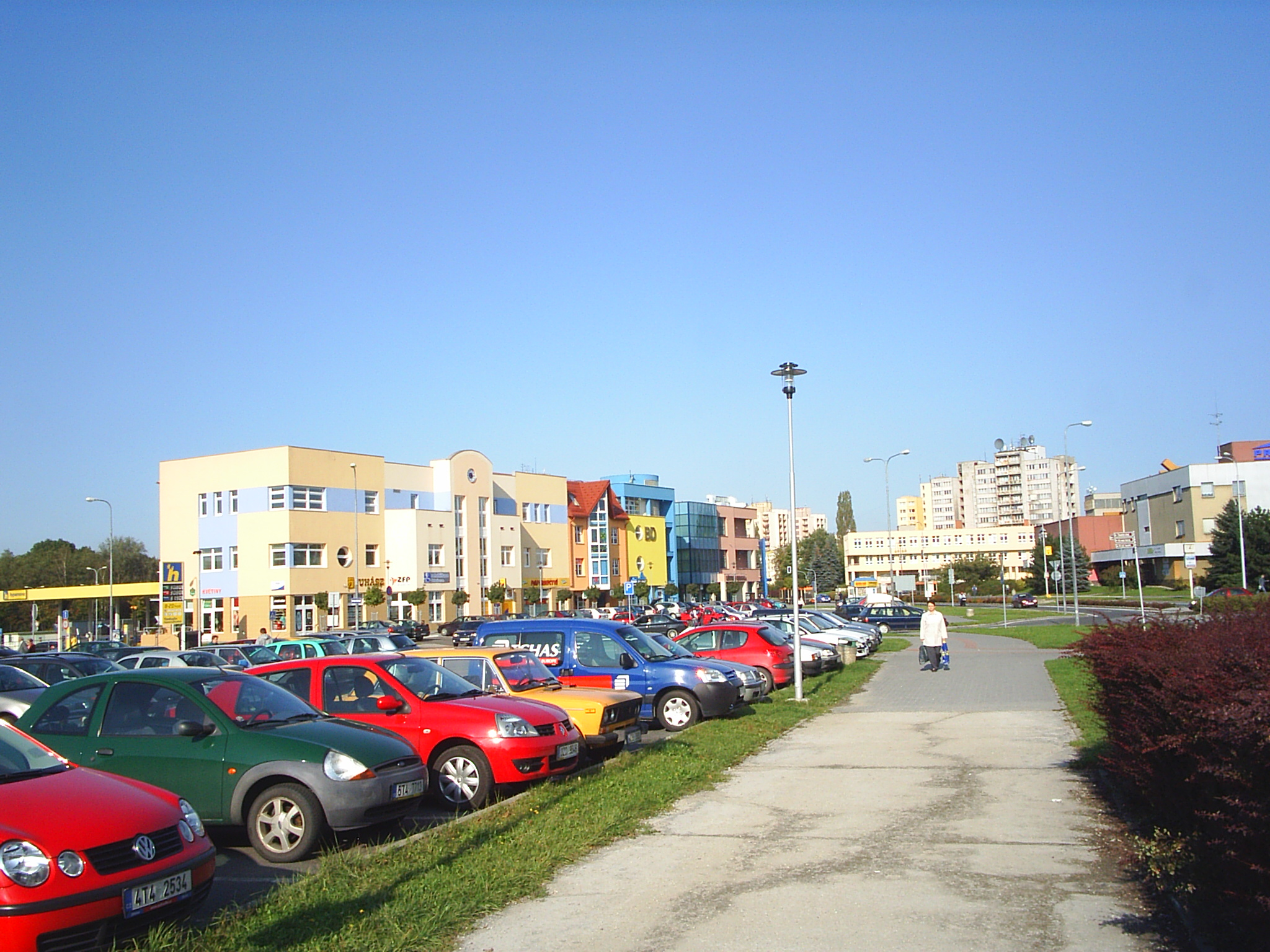
Downtown of Lutyně

Orlová consists of four municipal parts (in brackets population according to the 2021 census):

- Lazy (317)
- Lutyně (20,843)
- Město (1,143)
- Poruba (5,278)

== Etymology ==
The name is most probably possessive in origin, derived from the personal Slavic name Orel / Orzeł ('eagle' in English), although it may also be of topographic origin.

== Geography ==
Orlová is located about 9 kilometres (6 mi) east of Ostrava, in the historical region of Cieszyn Silesia. It lies in the Ostrava Basin. The town is situated at the confluence of the streams Rychvaldská Stružka and Petřvaldská Stružka. There are several fishponds in the municipal territory.

== History ==
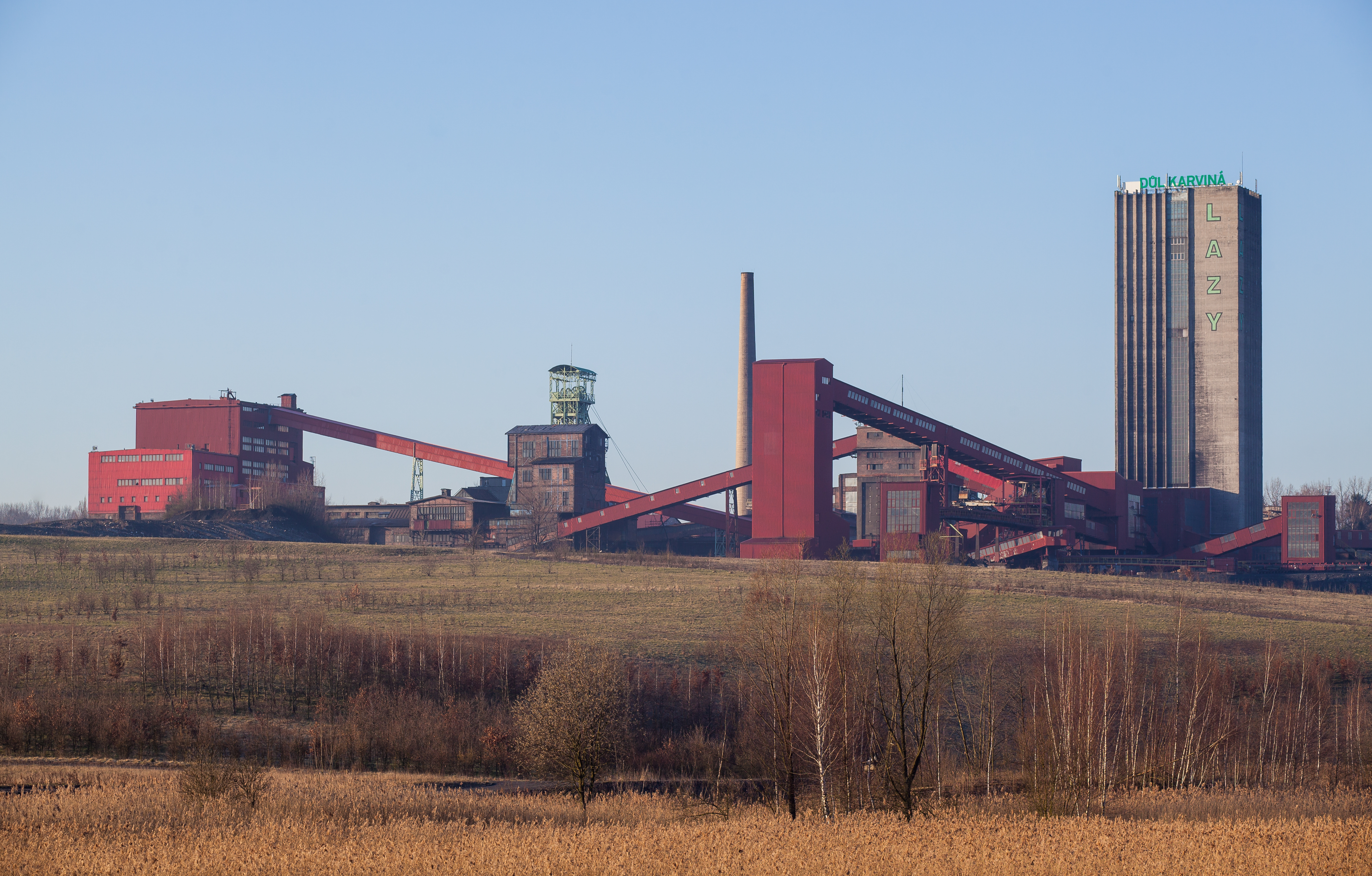
Lazy coal mine

=== 12th–18th centuries ===
According to legend, Duke Mieszko IV Tanglefoot went hunting with his pregnant wife Ludmila. As they rested upon a hill, an eagle suddenly took flight, frightening the couple. The eagle dropped its prey, which fell to earth near them. Ludmila prematurely gave birth to her child, Casimir I of Opole. The couple, seeing a sign from God in this incident, founded a chapel on that spot and later named the subsequent settlement after the eagle (Polish: orzeł, Czech: orel).

The first written mention of Orlová is from 1223, when a settlement in this locality was mentioned in a deed of bishop Wawrzyniec. The name Orlova was first used in a document of Pope Gregory IX issued on 7 December 1227 for the Benedictine abbey in Tyniec. Between 1268 and 1291, the Orlová monastery, separate from but dependent on Tyniec, was founded.

Politically it belonged then to the Duchy of Opole and Racibórz and the Castellany of Cieszyn, which was formed in 1290 in the process of feudal fragmentation of Poland into the Duchy of Teschen, ruled by a local branch of Silesian Piast dynasty. In 1327 the duchy became a fee of the Kingdom of Bohemia, which became a part of the Habsburg monarchy after 1526.

For centuries, the settlement had a mostly agricultural character, although there were also crafts, especially linen. After the secularisation of the monastery property in 1560, Orlová was acquired by the Cikán of Slupek family, who held it until 1619. From 1619 to 1838 it was owned by the Bludovský of Bludov family, who built a castle here in 1765.

=== 19th–20th centuries ===
The first attempts of coal mining took place in 1817. In 1838, Orlová was acquired by the Mattencloit family. In 1844, they allowed coal mining in the region, which led to a fundamental change in the character of the town. The population grew rapidly and mining colonies were established in the vicinity of the mines. Another important event was the completion of the Košice–Bohumín Railway in 1868. Industrial development has also brought a social and cultural boom. In the early 20th century, Orlová became an important centre of Polish and Czech education and was home to many cultural and sport organisations of both communities.

After the Revolutions of 1848 in the Austrian Empire, a modern municipal division was introduced in the re-established Austrian Silesia. The municipality was part of the political district and legal district of Freistadt in 1880. In 1908, the municipality was promoted to a market town and in 1922 to a town.

According to censuses conducted in 1880–1910, the dominant language spoken colloquially varied. In 1880 and 1900 the majority were Polish-speakers (2,287 or 79.8% in 1880 and 3,919 or 60.3% in 1900), whereas in 1890 and 1910 the majority were Czech-speakers (2,199 or 65.8% in 1890 and 4,799 or 58.5% in 1910). They were accompanied by a German-speaking minority (at least 4.7% in 1890, at most 7.3% in 1910). In terms of religion, in 1910 the majority were Roman Catholics (6,140 or 73.6%), followed by Protestants (1,801 or 21.6%), Jews (374 or 4.5%) and others (19 or 0.3%).

After World War I, Polish–Czechoslovak War and the division of Cieszyn Silesia in 1920, Orlová became a part of Czechoslovakia. Following the Munich Agreement, in October 1938, together with the Trans-Olza region it was annexed by Poland, administratively organised in Frysztat County of Silesian Voivodeship. The town was then annexed by Nazi Germany at the beginning of World War II. In 1943–1944, the German administration operated a forced labour camp in Lazy. After the war it was restored to Czechoslovakia.

In 1950, the municipalities of Lazy and Poruba were administratively joined to Orlová. In 1961, Lutyně (then named Horní Lutyně) was joined. From 1974 to 1990, Doubrava was also part of the town.

Widespread coal mining, especially during the communist era, had a devastating impact on the town, its buildings and architecture, especially in Lazy. The complete liquidation of Orlová and the relocation of its citizens to the surrounding municipalities were even considered. After the annexation of Horní Lutyně, this plan was changed into the idea of building a large housing estate in this village, which would offer a new home to people from undermined parts of the town and new citizens. Construction of the housing estate began in 1963. After the Velvet Revolution in 1989, there was a shift away from the town's one-sided focus on coal mining, and revitalisation efforts began.

== Demographics ==
Historical population

Year	Pop.	±%
1869	3,875	—
1880	6,332	+63.4%
1890	7,806	+23.3%
1900	15,820	+102.7%
1910	21,116	+33.5%

Year	Pop.	±%
1921	23,513	+11.4%
1930	24,847	+5.7%
1950	23,863	−4.0%
1961	21,543	−9.7%
1970	24,268	+12.6%

Year	Pop.	±%
1980	28,733	+18.4%
1991	36,339	+26.5%
2001	34,856	−4.1%
2011	29,896	−14.2%
2021	27,581	−7.7%

Source: Censuses

== Economy ==
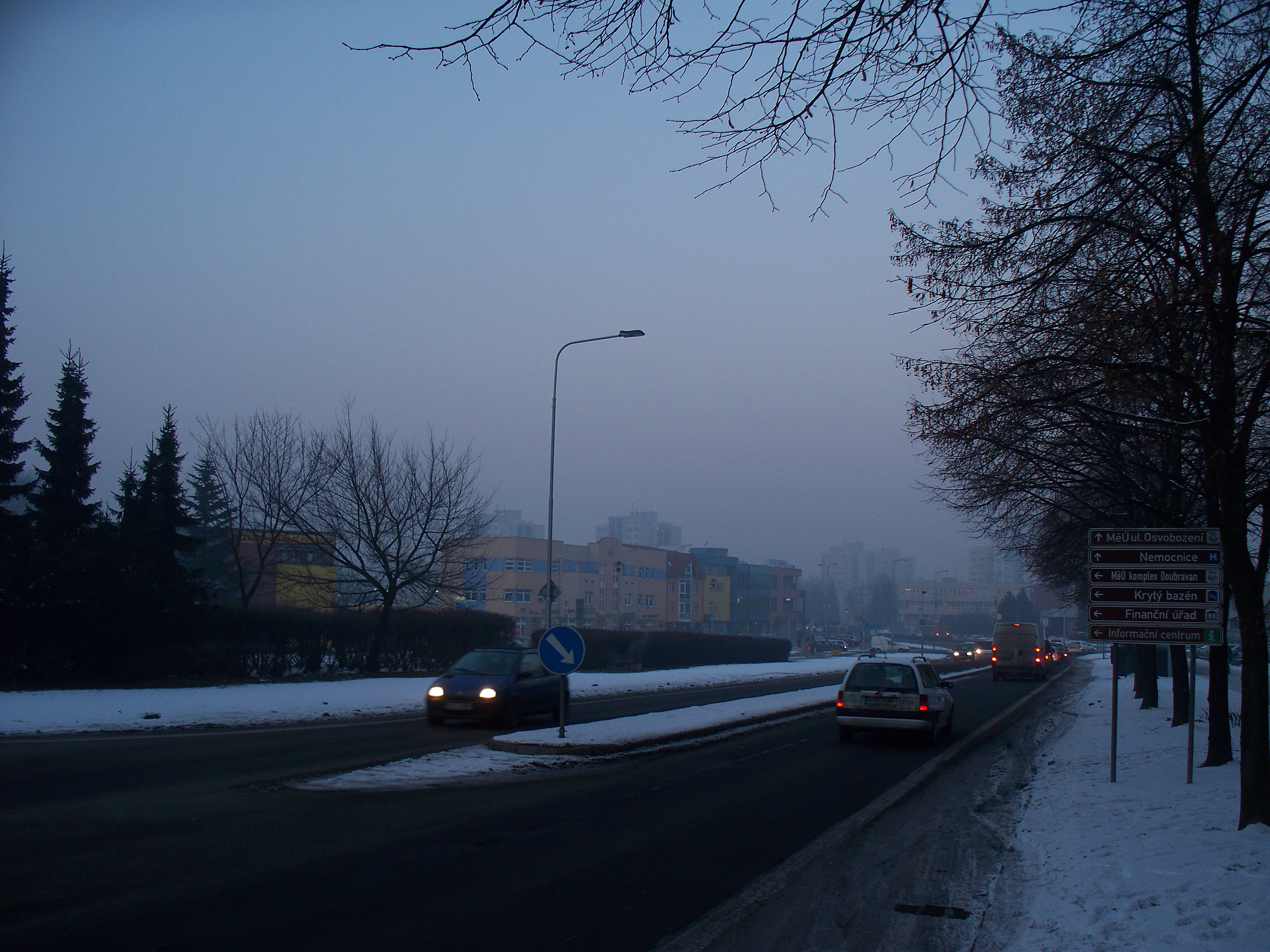
Winter smog situation in Orlová

In the Quality of Life Index, which has been comparing the standard of living in the cities and towns of the Czech Republic since 2018, Orlová has always finished in last place out of 206 evaluated. The town is facing high unemployment and lack of job opportunities, air pollution, insufficient infrastructure, demographic issues and other problems.

== Transport ==
The I/59 road from Ostrava to Karviná runs through the town.

== Education ==
There are seven primary schools in Orlová, including one in the Polish language. Five entities provide secondary education in the town and one entity provides a higher vocational education.

== Sport ==
Orlová hosts the final stage of the annual Gracia–Orlová women's cycle stage race.

The town's football club FK Slavia Orlová plays in the lower amateur tiers of the Czech football system.

== Sights ==
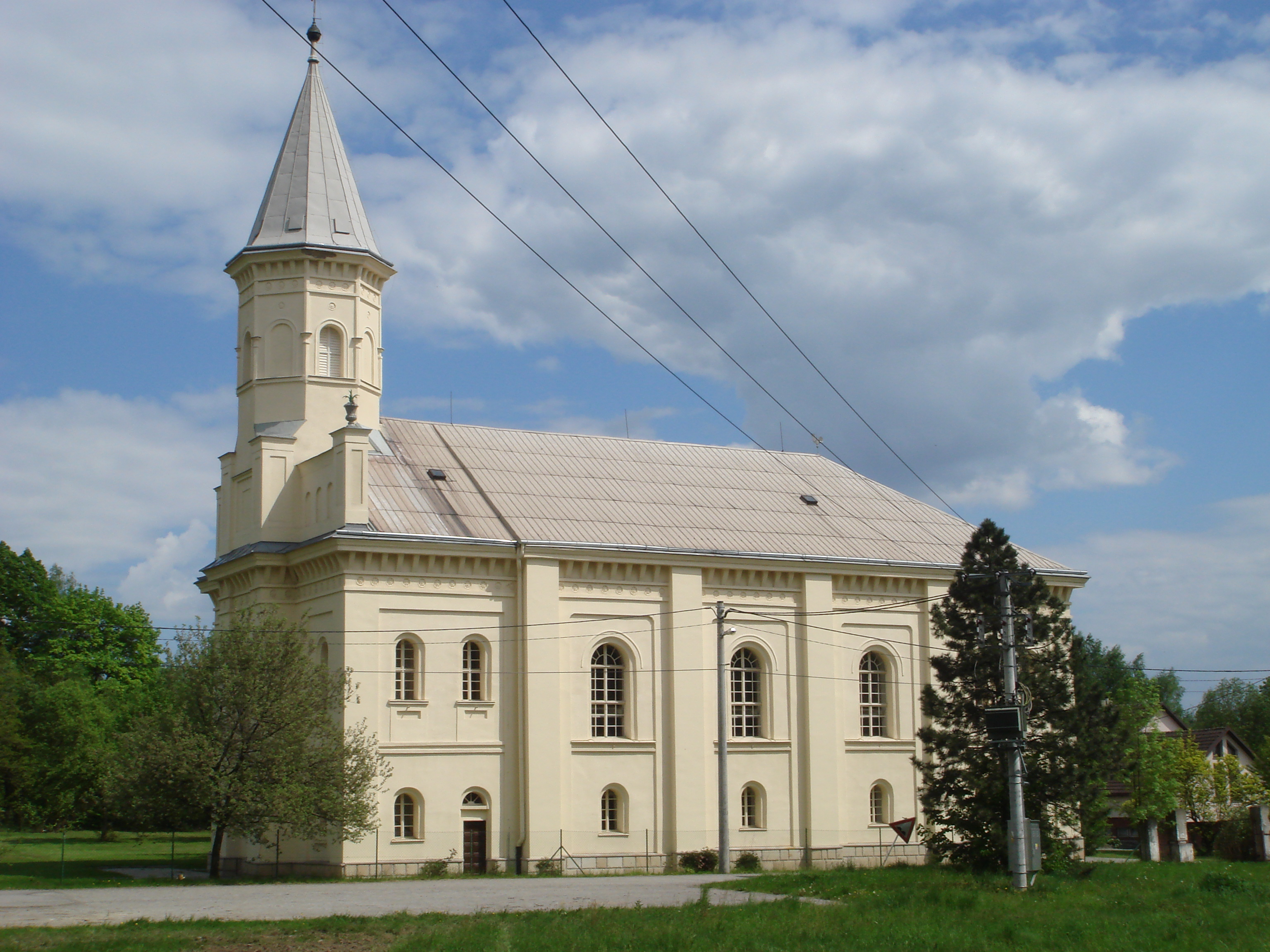
Lutheran church

The most important landmark in Orlová is the Church of the Nativity of the Virgin Mary, built in the neo-Gothic style in 1903–1906. Its neo-Gothic appearance is the cleanest in the Czech Republic. This church replaced an older church from 1466, which was built on a pilgrimage site documented in the 13th century. It has a presbytery from the previous church. The church complex includes a valuable set of statues with a staircase, and is surrounded by the adjacent castle park. The building is undermined and has been threatened with extinction several times in its history.

The castle park is located on the site of a castle from 1765, which was damaged by coal mining and subsequently demolished in 1974. The park was established in the first half of the 19th century.

Another notable landmark is the town hall from 1928. It is a three-storey house with a Neoclassical façade, protected as a cultural monument.

The Lutheran church is a Neoclassical building. It was consecrated in 1862.

== Notable people ==
- Emanuel Chobot (1881–1944), Polish politician
- Karol Piegza (1899–1988), Polish writer, folklorist and artist
- Józef Berger (1901–1962), Polish theologian and politician
- Adolf Fierla (1908–1967), Polish poet
- Gustaw Przeczek (1913–1974), Polish poet and writer
- Stanislav Kolíbal (born 1925), artist and sculptor
- Bohdan Warchal (1930–2000), Slovak violinist
- Eugene K. Balon (1930–2013), Polish-Czech-Canadian zoologist and ichthyologist
- Radim Uzel (1940–2022), sexologist; studied here
- Martina Janková (born 1972), opera singer

== Twin towns – sister cities ==
Orlová is twinned with:

- Crikvenica, Croatia
- Czechowice-Dziedzice, Poland
- Illnau-Effretikon, Switzerland
- Námestovo, Slovakia
- Rydułtowy, Poland
