= Emil Carlebach =

German politician (1914–2001)

Emil Carlebach (10 July 1914 – 9 April 2001) was a German Landtag member, writer and journalist. He was born and died in Frankfurt am Main.

== Life ==
Emil Carlebach was descended from a family of rabbis who had practiced in Germany for generations. However, at the time Emil was born, his father was the only non-religious member of the Carlebach family in Frankfurt. While still young, Emil turned away from the conservative, secular attitude of his parents and in 1932 joined the Young Communist League of Germany (Kommunistischer Jugendverband Deutschlands) KJVD.

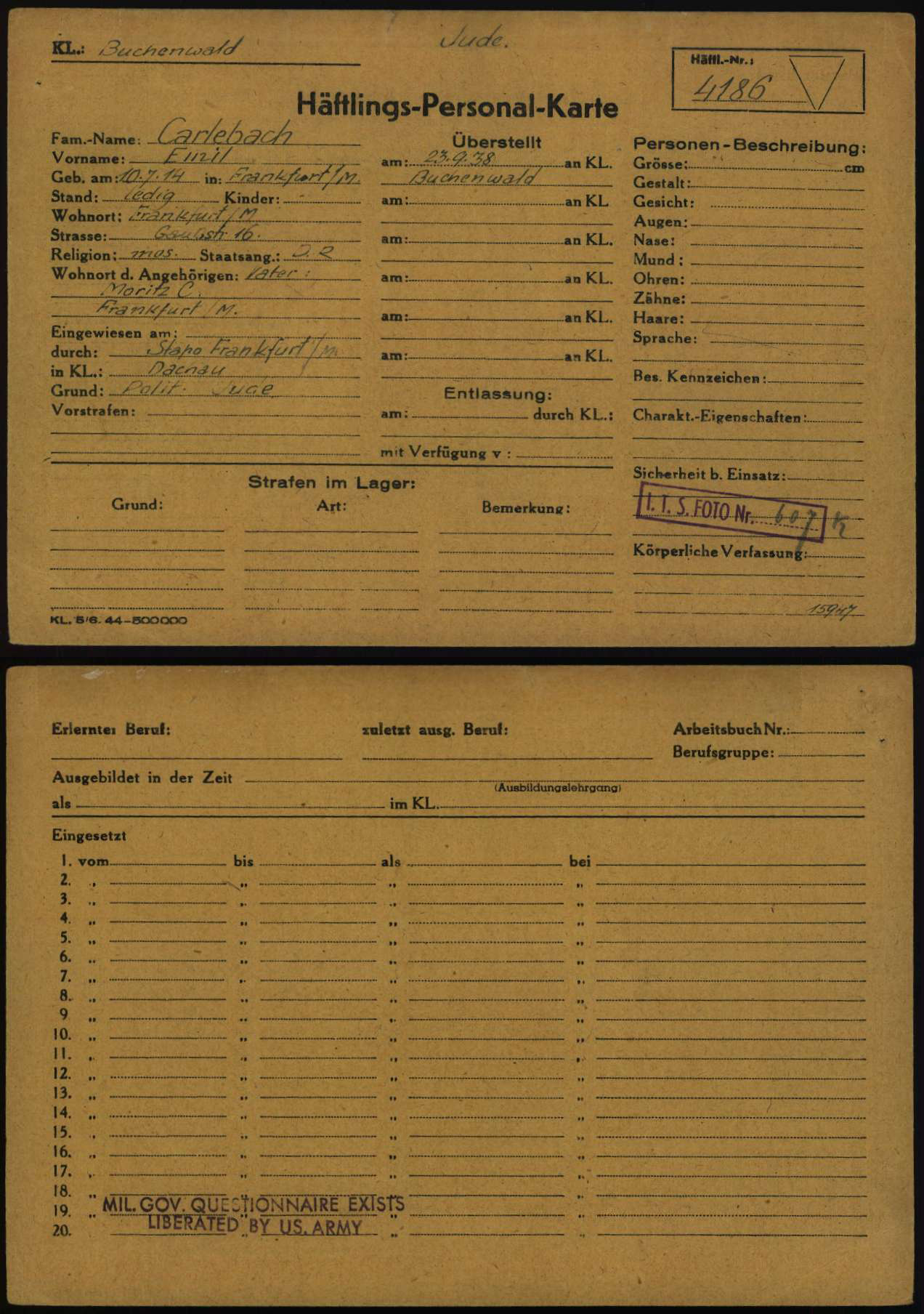
Registration card of Emil Carlebach as a prisoner at Buchenwald Nazi Concentration Camp

In early 1934, he was sentenced to three years in prison for distributing anti-fascist union publications. When that sentence was completed in 1937, he was transferred to the Dachau concentration camp and then imprisoned at Buchenwald in 1938. At Buchenwald, he was active in the illegal resistance organization. Following plans he designed, he launched a "call to mutiny" on 4 April 1945. He was to have been shot by the SS on 6 April 1945, for his efforts in the camp revolt, but was hidden by other prisoners and survived till liberation. After the liberation of the concentration camp, the prisoners from Buchenwald chose him as their spokesman; later he became the vice-president of the International Buchenwald Committee.

After 1946, he became first a Frankfurt city council member, then a member of the Hessian parliament, where he worked on the Hesse constitution.

Carlebach was one of seven original licensees of the Frankfurter Rundschau, a daily newspaper based in Frankfurt and the first licensed newspaper in the American Zone of Occupation in Germany. In 1947, without explanation, the U.S. Military Government in Germany revoked Carlebach's publisher's license.

He was a co-founder of the Union of Persecutees of the Nazi Regime (Vereinigung der Verfolgten des Naziregimes) or VVN.

In the early 1950s, a fierce dispute began between Carlebach and Margarete Buber-Neumann over the torture of German communists by Joseph Stalin in the Soviet Union. Carlebach disputed Stalin’s responsibility and maintained this position his entire life. In connection with this affair and later publications by him, Carlebach’s stance towards Buchenwald prisoners he did not consider "loyal" communists was criticized. Former fellow prisoner Benedikt Kautsky accused him of being partially responsible for the death of least two Polish prisoners.

After the West German Communist Party of Germany (KPD) was banned in 1956, he fled to the Deutsche Demokratische Republik (DDR, East Germany). There, he worked as a staff member for the Deutscher Freiheitssender 904 (German Freedom Radio 904). After his return to the Bundesrepublik Deutschland (BRD, West Germany), he was active in the VVN, the German Communist Party (DKP) and the Deutsche Journalistinnen- und Journalisten-Union (Union of German Journalists) until his death.

== Literary works ==
- Am Anfang stand ein Doppelmord
- Tote auf Urlaub - Kommunist in Deutschland Dachau und Buchenwald 1937-1945
- Zensur ohne Schere Die Gründerjahre der Frankfurter Rundschau 1945/47
- Hitler war kein Betriebsunfall- Hinter den Kulissen der Weimarer Republik
- Meldung als Waffe
- Kauf Dir einen Minister
- Von Brünning zu Hitler
- Buchenwald. Ein Konzentrationslager (by Emil Carlebach and Paul Grünewald, Hellmuth Röder, Willy Schmidt, Walter Vielhauer)

== Films ==
- Emil Carlebach - Kommunist Dokumentarfilm 1998 KAOS art and video archive

== Other sources ==
- Emil Carlebach, Zensur ohne Schere. Die Gründerjahre der 'Frankfurter Rundschau' 1945/1947 (Frankfurt, a.M.: Röderberg-Verlag, 1985)
- Ephraim Carlebach Stiftung (Ed.), Die Carlebachs: Eine Rabbinerfamilie aus Deutschland, Hamburg 1995
- Hans Schafranek, Zwischen NKWD und Gestapo, Frankfurt/M, 1990, Dokumentenanhang
- Lutz Niethammer (Ed.). Der "gesäuberte" Antifaschismus. Die SED und die roten Kapos von Buchenwald. Dokumente. Berlin, 1994
- Wolfgang Kraushaar, Sonnenuntergang - Das Verhältnis europäischer Intellektueller zum Kommunismus im Spiegel dreier Prozesse, in: Linke Geisterfahrer: Denkanstöße für eine antitotalitäre Linke, Frankfurt/M 2001
