= Kurt Nehrling =

German resistance member

- Undated photograph of Nehrling
- Born: Kurt Nehrling; 18 February 1899; Weimar, Germany
- Died: 22 December 1943 (aged 44); Dachau Concentration Camp, Germany
- Cause of death: Execution
- Occupations: Locksmith, politician
- Known for: German Resistance against Hitler
- Political party: Social Democratic Party
- Criminal charges: High treason
- Criminal penalty: Execution
- Spouse(s): Marie Prox (d. 1921); Hedwig Nerhling (m. 1923)
- Children: 2
- Parent(s): Max Nehrling, Emma Nerhling

Kurt Nehrling (February 13, 1899 – December 22, 1943) was a German SPD politician and member of the German resistance who founded the Nehrling-Eberling resistance group circa 1933. Nehrling was known for supplying intelligence to Soviet intelligence and hiding banned books. He was later arrested by the SS before being executed at the Dachau concentration camp in 1943.

== Biography ==
Kurt Nehrling was born in Weimar, Germany to restaurateurs Max and Emma Nehrling. During his adolescent years, his father also worked in a hairdressing profession according to his birth certificate. His parents' restaurant, Zum Goldenen Stern in the Jakobstrasse, was a popular workers' tavern, having served as a venue for members of the Social-Democratic People Association (an SPD local chapter). This exposure influenced Nehrling's future political career. From 1901 to 1905, membership in the SPD local chapter increased dramatically from 120 to 616. Thus the party formed an autonomous social and cultural environment in the worker-populated areas of the Weimar. In 1907, the Social Democrats, trade unions, and associations laid the foundation for their own building, the "Community Center". Two years later, a local group of the Socialist Worker Youth was formed within the area.

Nehrling joined the SPD in 1919. In the aftermath of the First World War, he worked at the district administration of Weimar, where he became acquainted with Marie Prox, the daughter of Emil Prox, the chairman to the Social Democratic People Association. In 1921, Nehrling married Prox but tragedy struck two years later when Marie succumbed to complications from childbirth with their second child. Nehrling, however, resumed maintaining strong relations with his father-in-law. Although Prox is not remembered today, Nehrling's son later recalled his significance on his father's life.

During the 1923 socialist insurrection, he became a chancellery secretary for the provisional socialist government. Later on that year he served as an employee in the Thuringian Ministry of Economic Affairs, where he met and later married his second wife, Hedwig Nehrling.

In 1929, Nehrling became ill with tuberculosis; Having fought the long illness, he finally recovered two years afterward, before encountering further political difficulties. Irrespective of his employment in the Thüringer government, the NSDAP severed their relationship with the SPD in 1933 before terminating all members external to the NSDAP. Kurt and his wife faced immense financial issues within this period, intensified by the economic situation. In their dwelling they established Homestead Way 16 (Currently Kurt Nehrling road), a provisional linen shop, subsequently moving to a corner shop at the Zeppelinplatz. Nehrling also joined the Social-Democratic Reichsbanner Schwarz-Rot-Gold, an organization formed to defend German parliamentary democracy against internal subversion and extremism from both the left and right.

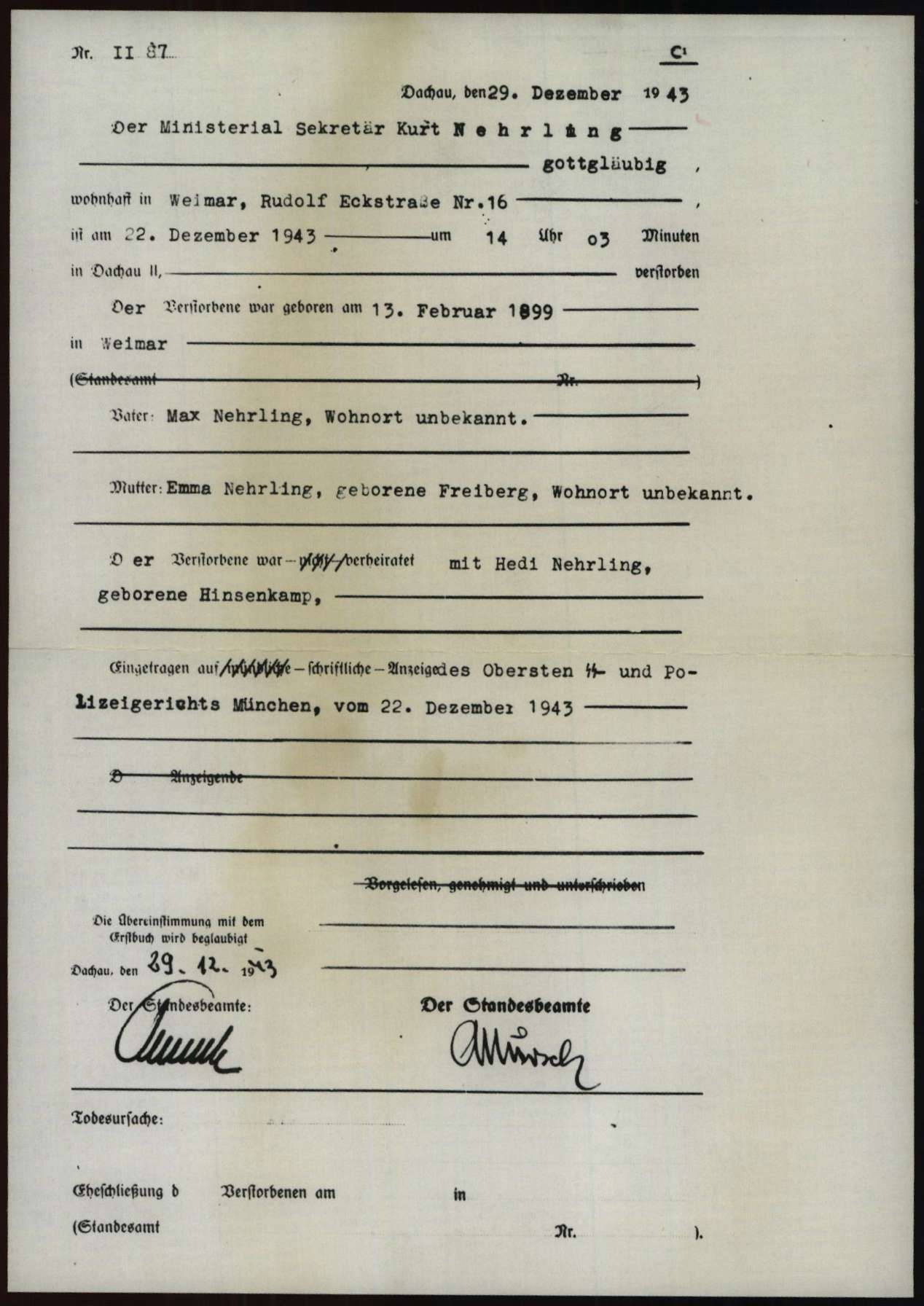
Death certificate of Kurt Nehrling, prisoner in Dachau Nazi Concentration Camp

The linen shop Nehrling at the Zeppelinplatz already became known soon after Hitler's seizure of power, the meeting place in the west of Weimar near remaining SPD members. Above all youths from the social-democratic worker youth, whom did not wish to realign themselves to a private retreat, gathered themselves around Kurt Nehrling. It held only a few during the crucial years ahead in opposition, albeit as much manpower available was required. Its generation had experienced the war at the own body and the Weimar Republic.

Alongside Nehrling, Hans Eberling, the former SPD subdistrict secretary, coordinated the contacts of the group. They formed a political circle, which resumed the discussions, received or exchanged illegal material and organised themselves intent upon resisting the NSDAP and war effort. Meeting places were members' dwellings, garden celebrations or roadways. Nehrling not only managed to hold the group together, though also maintained contacts to Social Democrats in Berlin, Erfurt and Vienna, in what was deemed a very dangerous risk. There were further connections to Leipzig, north living, Gera and Koblenz. After the Gestapo's discovery of the "New Beginnings" resistance network, individual members such as Nehrling were arrested, leading to the suspension of most of their activities.

Kurt Nehrling was conscripted after the beginning of the war as an accountant at the local police headquarters. Nehrling immediately capitalised upon this opportunity to search forward intelligence regarding the future German assault on the USSR, and aimed for political discussion with his fellow colleagues to obtain more information. This was a major risk, however the danger of denunciation was irrelevant to him personally. Nehrling requested a transfer in 1942 after a dissentious remark was revealed, whereby he was faced with imminent prosecution. To administrative superiors however, this almost equated to a self-declaration of guilt on his behalf. One of his colleagues disclosed the minutes of a discussion with Nehrling, whereby further anti-party expressions were made the day afterwards, which essentially cost his life. He received a suspension on 1 December 1942 after his resistance involvement was discovered.

In January Kurt Nehrling was summoned to an interrogation and heard by an SS-Gerichtsoffizier in presence of witnesses, before being arrested the following month on 16 February 1943. Initially he did not suspect that those pursuing him held evidence, nor did he anticipate imprisonment. His Weimar lawyer defender, Dr. Friedrich Dearchild, firmly requested a plea deal of two years imprisonment with prosecutors.

However the domestic situation had changed, as well as on the Eastern Front. In the aftermath of the defeat at Stalingrad, counterintelligence operations were intensified against infiltration networks, even retroactively, with drastic means. In this moment one remembered the incident of 1942. Former colleagues resumed denouncing Nehrling, whilst the incident set a precedent for investigators; One wanted to punish Kurt Nehrling as particular in such a way that the judgement would prevent further infiltrations within Nazi Germany. Associations with other members were, fortunately for the cell, not discovered by the investigating authorities.

Nehrling was unwavering whilst in custody despite the evidence displayed against his espionage. He wrote final letters to his family in anticipation of a future execution, before his conditions for such were arranged. The Reichsgericht then sentenced him to death on 23 September 1943 on the grounds of "military force decomposition". Shortly afterwards, he was transported to Dachau concentration camp. He was executed approximately two months later on 22 December 1943.

In May 1945 the American commander of the Weimar garrison was travelling along a corner road, in which Kurt Nehrling had used, before somehow crashing his vehicle. He discovered traces of the former cell at some point thereafter whilst waiting for assistance. The aforementioned road was later renamed "Kurt Nehrling road". The enamel board, which for many decades was beside the Kurt Nehrling street sign, disappeared for years until reconstruction years later.

Hedwig Nehrling remained in Weimar and continued operating their linen shop until 1953. Due to the restrictive policy against merchants, she was forced to sell the business soon after the war ended. Alikened to other former cell members, the SED celebrated its status in initial hope of drawing more youth recruitment over Nehrling's legacy. During the 1950s, the building was subject to Stasi supervision, whereby two undercover agents routinely encountered the area for potential recruits.

One of the Orpo officers who held custody of Nehrling was arrested after the war. He was brought to beech forest into Soviet special camp No. 2 and died there in October 1945. The remaining authorities involved in his prosecution were entirely unpunished after the war, resuming their career in Western Germany. The SS-judges and the SS-prosecutor remained active subsequent to 1945 as attorneys and within the public service.

== See also ==
- German Resistance
