= Stanisław Dobosiewicz =

Polish writer and school teacher (1910-2007)

Stanisław Dobosiewicz (1910–2007) was a Polish writer and school teacher. He is best known as the author of a monumental monograph of the Gusen part of the former Mauthausen-Gusen concentration camp. Born in Maków Mazowiecki, Dobosiewicz became a lyceum teacher in the interbellum. Arrested in April 1940, in the course of the AB Action, he was sent to Dachau concentration camp and then to KL Gusen, where he spent the entire war.

After the war, he resumed his teaching career and became one of the prominent members of the Polish section of the Mauthausen-Gusen Club of former inmates of that camp. He also started gathering materials for his future book on the camp. Eventually, he published four books on the history of the camp, each devoted to a different aspect of life there.

He died in 2007 at the age of 96, leaving behind his wife and 2 sons.

== Links ==
- Stanisław Dobosiewicz. Mauthausen / Gusen. Obóz zagłady Publish. Ministry of National Defense, 1977 (in Polish)
- Stanisław Dobosiewicz. Vernichtungslager Gusen Bundesministerium für Inneres, Abt. IV/7, 2007 (in German)
- Stanisław Dobosiewicz. Mauthausen Gusen: samoobrona i konspiracja Wydawnictwo Ministerstwa Obrony Narodowej, 1980 (in Polish)
- Stanisław Dobosiewicz. Mauthausen-Gusen, poezja i pieśń więźniów Instytut Wydawniczy Pax, 1983 (in Polish)
- Stanisław Dobosiewicz. Reforma szkoły podstawowej Ksia̧żka i Wiedza, 1971 (in Polish)
- Karol K. Czejarek. Karol Czejarek poleca: Gwara Makowa Mazowieckiego i okolic, „Pułtuska Gazeta Powiatowa”, Grzegorz Gerek (red.nacz.), Pułtusk: Pułtusk-Press, 29 listopada 2011, ISSN 1508-4078, BWC 2004/229 (in Polish)
- Piotr P. Filipkowski. StanisławS. Dobosiewicz StanisławS., Świadkowie - Stanisław Dobosiewicz, [w:] Archiwum Historii Mówionej [online], 8 czerwca 2002 [dostęp 2015-05-11] (in Polish)
- Bogdan B. Hillebrandt. (ed.), Postępowe organizacje młodzieżowe w Warszawie: 1864-1976, Warszawa: PWN, 1988, s. 323, ISBN 978-83-01-07498-2, PB 1988/6106. (in Polish)
- Tadeusz T. Kowalski. Kształtowanie się szkolnictwa powiatu pułtuskiego w latach 1944-1946, BenonB. Dymek (red.), „Rocznik Mazowiecki”, 19, Warszawa: Mazowieckie Towarzystwo Naukowe, 2007, s. 174-192, ISSN 0080-3529 [dostęp 2015-05-27] (in Polish)
- Sergiusz S. Minorski. Czas przed burzą, Warszawa: Nasza Księgarnia, 1973, PB 1974/1520 (in Polish)
- Zbigniew Z. Wlazłowski. Przez kamieniołomy i kolczasty drut, Kraków: Wydawnictwo Literackie, 1974, s. 184, PB 1974/7600 (in Polish)
