= Grzegorz Timofiejew =

Polish poet

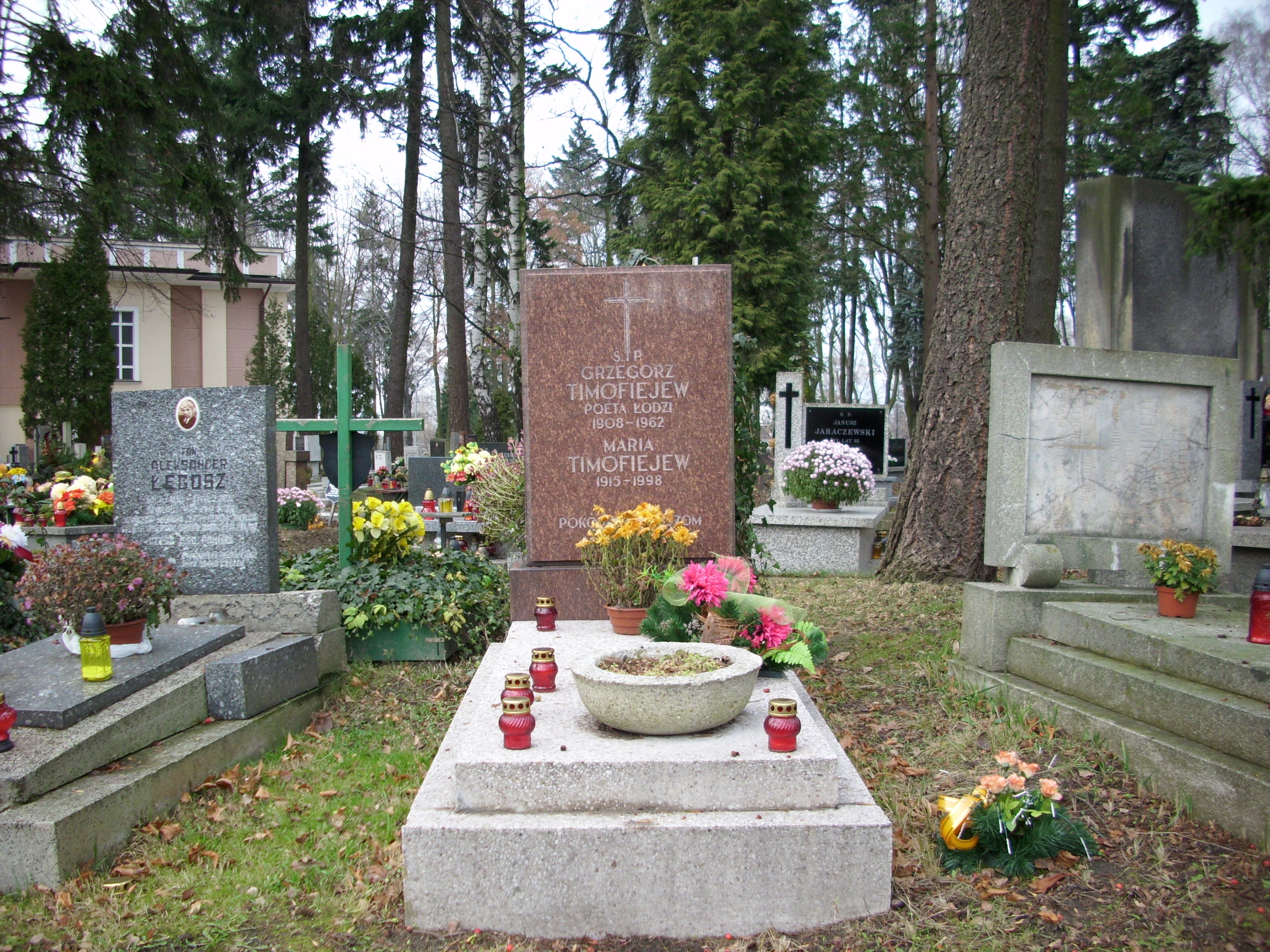
- Born: 16 January 1908; Łódź, Poland
- Died: 3 March 1962 (aged 54)
- Occupation: Poet

Grzegorz Timofiejew (Polish pronunciation: [ˈɡʐɛɡɔʂ timɔˈfjejɛf]; 11 March 1908 – 3 October 1962) was a Polish poet of distant Russian ancestry. He was born and died in Łódź.

In 1928 he was among the co-founders of the Meteor poetic group. After the outbreak of World War II he was also an active member of the resistance and the editor of Tyrtej literary monthly, published underground in occupied Poland. In 1942 he was arrested by the Germans and sent to Auschwitz and then to Gusen I concentration camps.

== Works ==
- Nie ma mnie w domu (1930)
- Inny horyzont (1935)
- Wysoki płomień. Wiersze z konspiracji i obozu (1946)
- W stronę jutra (1954)
- Wiersze dla dzieci (1957)
- Gorycz wierzbiny (1958)
- Miłość nie zna zmęczenia (1959)
- Człowiek jest nagi (1960)
- Wiersze wybrane (1961)
- Trudna wolność (1964)
