= Karol Piegza =

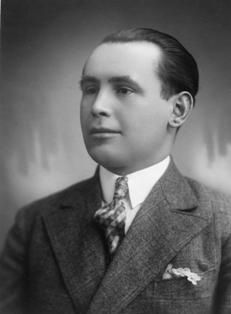
- Karol Piegza
- Born: 9 October 1899; Łazy, Austria-Hungary
- Died: 3 February 1988 (aged 88); Jablunkov, Czechoslovakia
- Citizenship: Austrian, Czechoslovak
- Occupations: Teacher, writer, folklorist, photographer, and painter
- Spouse(s): Augustyna Fierla (died 1958); Agnieszka Łupińska (died 1993)
- Writing career
- Language: Polish, Cieszyn Silesian dialect

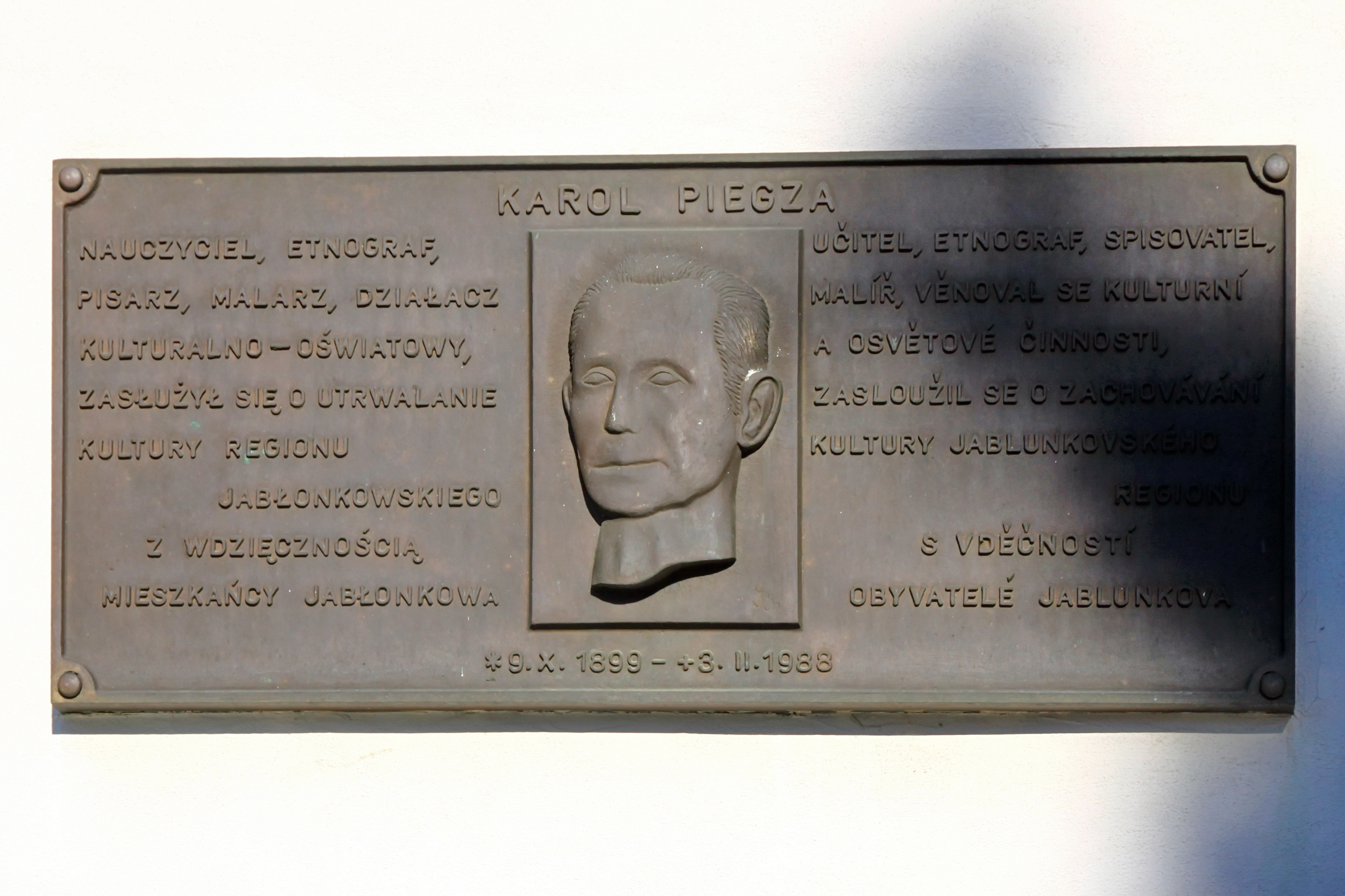
Memorial plaque at the PZKO House in Jabłonków

Karol Piegza (9 October 1899 – 3 February 1988) was a Polish teacher, writer, folklorist, photographer, and painter.

== Biography ==
Piegza was born in Lazy the son of a coal miner. He worked at coal mining for a time when he was 14. It was in the coal mining colony in Lazy where he first listened to the stories and fables told by coal miners. That experience influenced his future life and inspired his works until 1945.

At the beginning of 1918 Piegza was conscripted into the Austro-Hungarian Army and sent to the Italian Front of World War I.

After the war, he was active in the social life and several organizations before World War II. He graduated from a school for teachers in Cieszyn-Bobrek and eventually worked as a teacher at Polish schools in Trans-Olza — in Lazy, Orlová, Stonava, and after the war in Jablunkov. He was also a principal of schools in Lazy, Stonava, and Jablunkov.

During World War II Piegza was incarcerated in Nazi concentration camps in Dachau and Mauthausen-Gusen.

After the war Piegza settled in Jablunkov where he became a principal of the Polish school (from 1945 to 1960) and worked in a local branch of Polish Cultural and Educational Union. He was instrumental in organizing the first Gorolski Święto festival in 1948, which presented the culture and traditions of the local people. Piegza was fascinated by the culture and traditions of Cieszyn Silesia and was a keen collector of everything related to regional culture.

I'm just an ordinary teacher-pensioner who came to like local folklore, so when I write, paint, or photograph something, I do it from my passion, to save the remnants of Silesian folklore and culture from oblivion.

— Karol Piegza

He wrote his works in literary Polish and in the local dialect. His works often focus on regional folklore and regional fables, most often those of the local Gorals. After his death in Jablunkov, the Karol Piegza Small Regional Museum in Bukovec was opened.

== Works ==
=== Brochures ===
- Malarze śląscy (1937)
- Kozubowa (1939)
- Ceramika cieszyńska (1971)
- Komedianci (1979)
- Cieszyńskie skrzynie malowane (1983)

=== Short stories collections ===
- Sękaci ludzie (1963, 1979 and 2019)
- Opowiadania beskidzkie (1971)
- Tam pod Kozubową (1974)

=== Poetry collection ===
- Echa spod hałdy (1975)

=== Other ===
- Hawiyrski bojki (1952)
- Gajdosz z Kurajki (1953)
- Toporem pisane (1955)
- Nowele beskidzkie (1961)
