= Pudlov =

Coordinates: 49°53′47″N 18°19′47″E

- Village
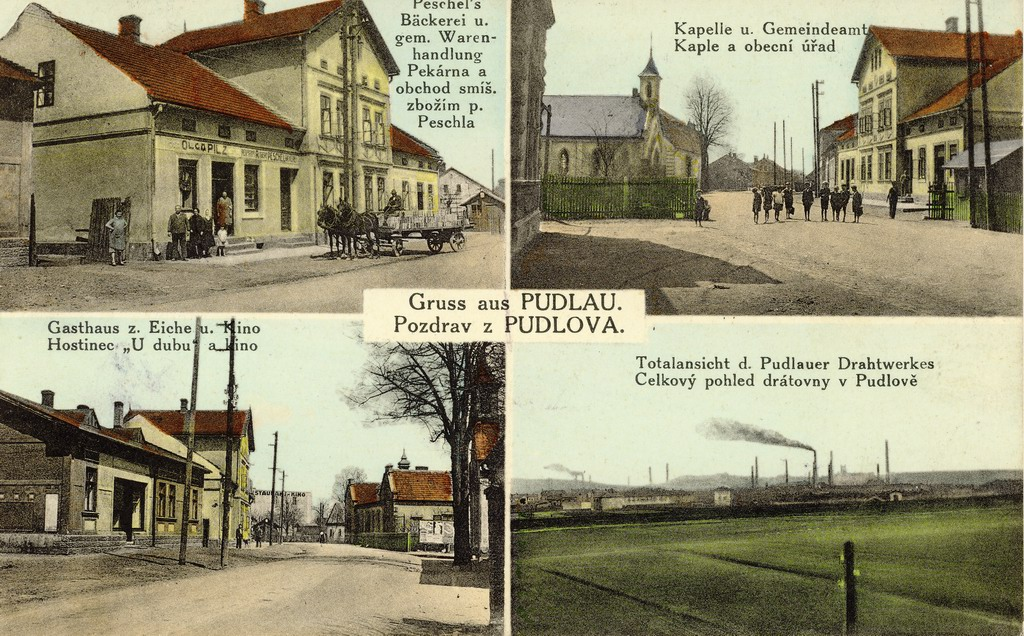
- Postcard for Pudlov

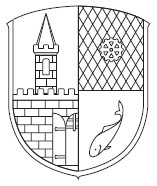
- Coat of arms
- Country: Czech Republic
- Region: Moravian-Silesian Region
- District: Karviná District

Population
  - Total: 1,006

Pudlov (Polish: Pudłów, German: Pudlau) is a village in Karviná District, Moravian-Silesian Region, Czech Republic. It was a separate municipality but became administratively a part of Bohumín in 1974. It has a population of 1,006 (2022). The village lies in the historical region of Cieszyn Silesia.

== History ==
The village was first mentioned in a written document in 1428. It was heavily influenced by the industry. At the beginning of the 20th century, rapid industrial development occurred, which led also to a rise of the village's population.

According to the Austrian census of 1910 the village had 3,016 inhabitants, 2,865 of whom had permanent residence there. The census asked people for their native language; 1,761 (61.5%) were German-speaking, 992 (34.6%) were Polish-speaking and 112 (3.9%) were Czech-speaking. Jews were not allowed to declare Yiddish, most of them thus declared the German language as their native. The most populous religious groups were Roman Catholics with 2,733 (90.6%), followed by Protestants with 112 (3.7%).

After World War I, fall of Austria-Hungary, Polish–Czechoslovak War and the division of Cieszyn Silesia in 1920, the village became a part of Czechoslovakia. Following the Munich Agreement, in October 1938 together with the Zaolzie region it was annexed by Poland, administratively organised in Frysztat County of Silesian Voivodeship. The village was then annexed by Nazi Germany at the beginning of World War II. After the war it was restored to Czechoslovakia.

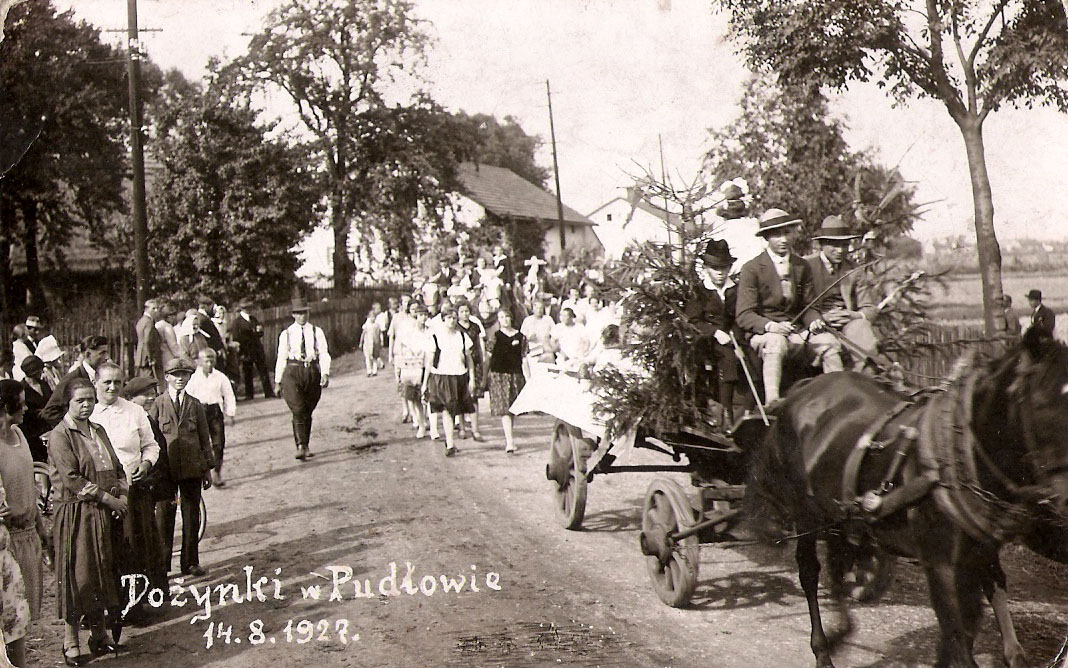
Dożynki (Polish harvest festival) in the village, 1927.

== Notable people ==
- Tomáš Pospíchal, footballer

== See also ==
- Polish minority in the Czech Republic
- Zaolzie
