= Skřečoň =

Coordinates: 49°54′24″N 18°22′43″E

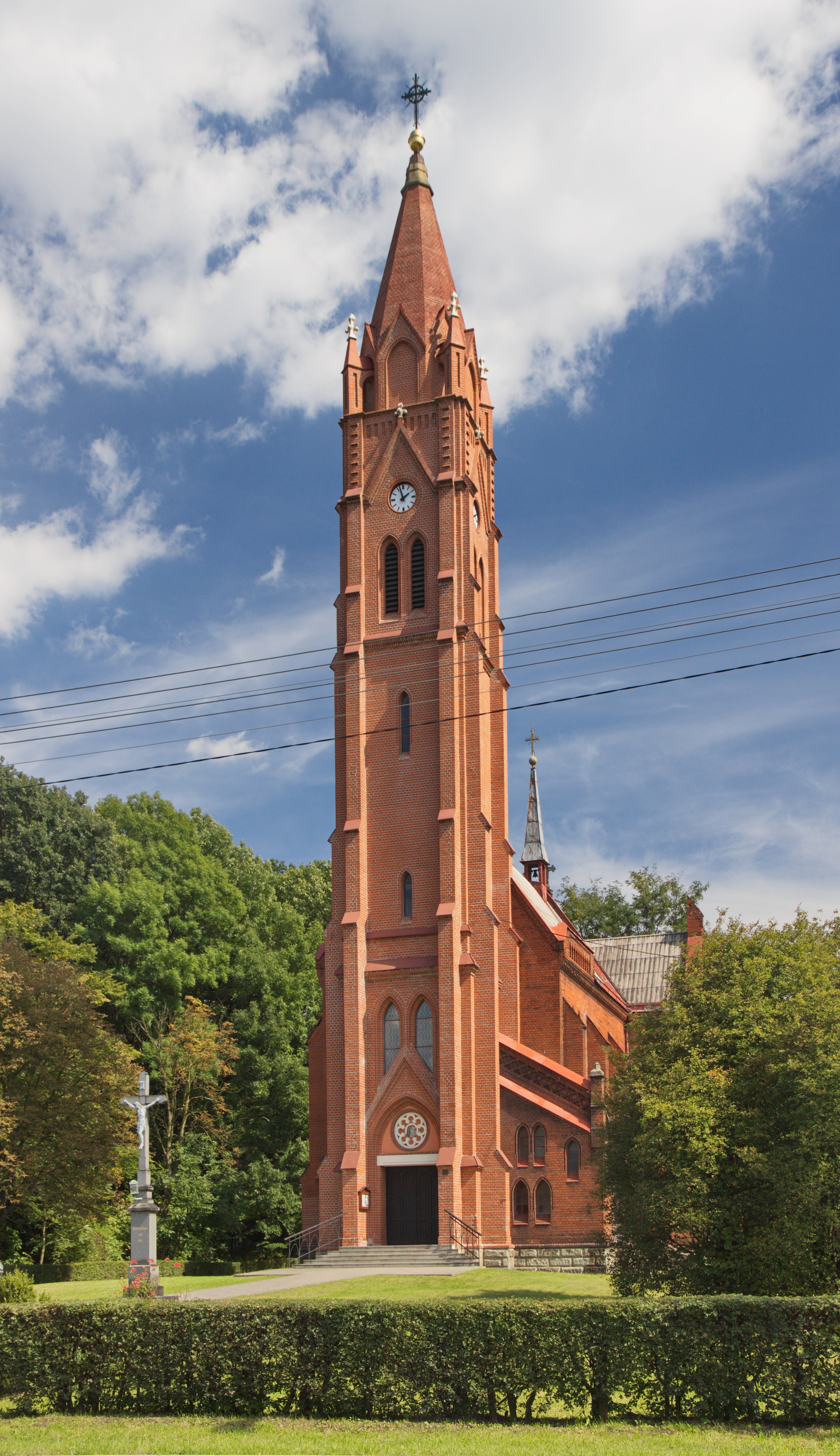
Church of our Lady of Sorrows

Skřečoň (German: Skretschon, Polish: Skrzeczoń) is a village in Karviná District, Moravian-Silesian Region, Czech Republic. It was a separate municipality but became administratively a part of Bohumín in 1974. It has a population of 2,656 (2022). The village lies in the historical region of Cieszyn Silesia.

== History ==
The village was first mentioned in a Latin document of Diocese of Wrocław called Liber fundationis episcopatus Vratislaviensis from around 1305 as item in Crezhim V) mansi. It meant that the village was supposed to pay tithe from 5 greater lans. The creation of the village was a part of a larger settlement campaign taking place in the late 13th century on the territory of what will be later known as Upper Silesia.

Politically the village belonged initially to the Duchy of Teschen, formed in 1290 in the process of feudal fragmentation of Poland and was ruled by a local branch of Piast dynasty. In 1327 the duchy became a fee of Kingdom of Bohemia, which after 1526 became part of the Habsburg monarchy.

At the beginning of the 20th century rapid industrial development occurred, leading to a rise of the village's population.

After World War I, fall of Austria-Hungary, Polish–Czechoslovak War and the division of Cieszyn Silesia in 1920, the village became a part of Czechoslovakia. Following the Munich Agreement, in October 1938 together with the Zaolzie region it was annexed by Poland, administratively organised in Frysztat County of Silesian Voivodeship. The village was then annexed by Nazi Germany at the beginning of World War II. After the war it was restored to Czechoslovakia.

There is a Catholic church in the village. Its foundation stone was laid down in May 1912; construction began next year but it was stopped due to the outbreak of World War I. After the war Adolf Bertram, Bishop of Breslau, donated 250,000 Kčs to the construction. In 1924 it was finally consecrated. The cemetery was established in 1904.

== See also ==
- Polish minority in the Czech Republic
- Zaolzie
