= Starý Bohumín =

- Municipal part of Bohumín
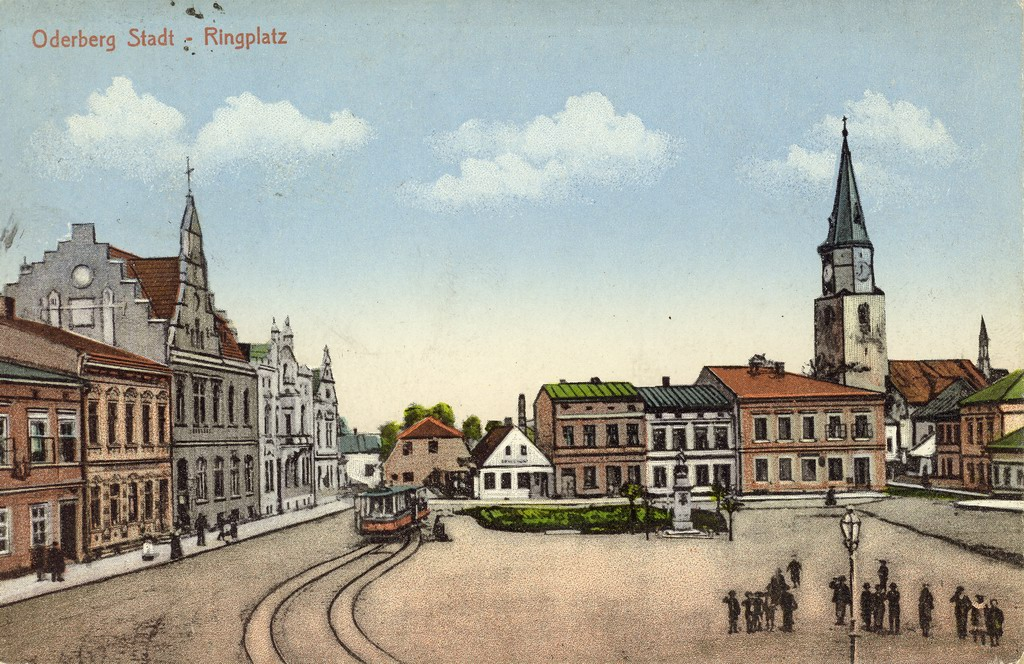
- Town square in 1913
- Interactive map of Starý Bohumín
- Coordinates: 49°55′08″N 18°19′59″E
- Country: Czech Republic
- Region: Moravian-Silesian
- District: Karviná
- Municipality: Bohumín

Area
  - Total: 4.91 km^{2} (1.90 sq mi)

Population (2024)
  - Total: 1,346
  - Density: 274/km^{2} (710/sq mi)
- Time zone: UTC+1 (CET)
  - Summer (DST): UTC+2 (CEST)
- Postal code: 735 81

Starý Bohumín (German: Alt Oderberg, Polish: Stary Bogumin, lit. 'Old Bohumín') is a municipal part of the town of Bohumín in Karviná District in the Moravian-Silesian Region of the Czech Republic. It has a population of 1,346 as of 2024.

== History ==
The settlement was first mentioned in a written document in 1256 as Bogun and is the oldest part of today's town of Bohumín. Starý Bohumín lies on the Oder River, which forms a border with Poland. Before the construction of the Bohumín-Košice railway line, local inhabitants opposed train station to be built in their town. The construction was moved a few kilometres southeastward, and Starý Bohumín gradually lost its importance.

After World War I, fall of Austria-Hungary, Polish–Czechoslovak War and the division of Cieszyn Silesia in 1920, the town became a part of Czechoslovakia. Following the Munich Agreement, in October 1938 together with the Zaolzie region it was annexed by Poland, administratively organised in Frysztat County of Silesian Voivodeship. The town was then annexed by Nazi Germany at the beginning of World War II. After the war it was restored to Czechoslovakia.

== Demographics ==
Historical population

Year	Pop.	±%
1869	1,333	—
1880	1,260	−5.5%
1890	1,371	+8.8%
1900	1,888	+37.7%
1910	2,794	+48.0%

Year	Pop.	±%
1921	3,190	+14.2%
1930	3,188	−0.1%
1950	2,964	−7.0%
1961	2,422	−18.3%
1970	1,834	−24.3%

Year	Pop.	±%
1980	1,442	−21.4%
1991	1,450	+0.6%
2001	1,660	+14.5%
2011	1,528	−8.0%
2021	1,348	−11.8%

Source: Censuses

== See also ==
- Polish minority in the Czech Republic
- Zaolzie
