= Doly (Karviná) =

Coordinates: 49°50′5″N 18°29′7″E

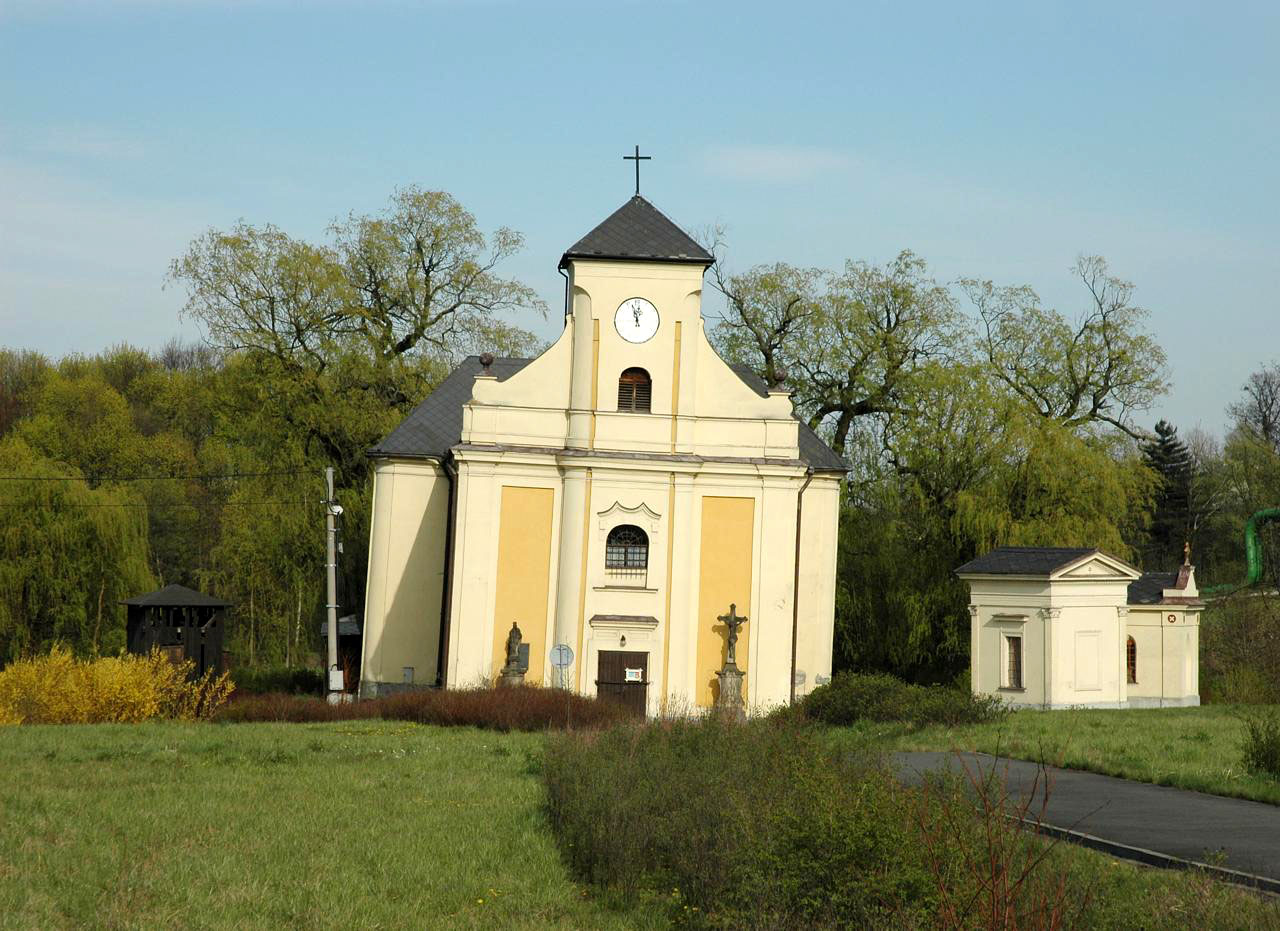
Saint Peter of Alcantara Church

Doly (Polish: Kopalnie, lit. "mines") is a district of the city of Karviná in Karviná District, Moravian-Silesian Region, Czech Republic. It lies on the southwestern edge of the city, in the historical region of Cieszyn Silesia and has a population of 810 (2001).

In the area of the district there was a settlement called Solca (Polish: Solca, German: Solza), historically an independent village, now abandoned.

== History ==
The village of Karviná was first mentioned in a Latin document of Diocese of Wrocław called Liber fundationis episcopatus Vratislaviensis from around 1305 as item in Carvina XI) mansi. It meant that the village was obliged to pay a tithe from 11 smaller lans. The creation of the village was a part of a larger settlement campaign taking place in the late 13th century on the territory of what would later be known as Upper Silesia. In the document from 1331 it was mentioned under an alias name as Arnoldesdorf which indicates substantial German settlement alongside indigenous Slavic one.

Politically the village belonged initially to the Duchy of Teschen, formed in 1290 in the process of feudal fragmentation of Poland and was ruled by a local branch of Silesian Piast dynasty. In 1327 the duchy became a fee of the Kingdom of Bohemia, which after 1526 became part of the Habsburg monarchy.

The village became a seat of a Catholic parish, which was mentioned in the register of Peter's Pence payment from 1447 among the 50 parishes of Teschen deanery as Arnoldi villa. (Note: Identification of Arnoldi villa as Jaworze is wrong, compare: Mrózek, Robert (1984). Nazwy miejscowe dawnego Śląska Cieszyńskiego [Local names of former Cieszyn Silesia] (in Polish). Katowice: Uniwersytet Śląski w Katowicach. pp. 83, 86. ISSN 0208-6336.) After the 1540s Protestant Reformation prevailed in the Duchy of Teschen and a local Catholic church was taken over by Lutherans. It was taken from them (as one from around fifty buildings in the region) by a special commission and given back to the Roman Catholic Church on 26 March 1654.

In 1776 deposits of black coal were discovered in the village. Its exploitation began in 1794. Subsequently many miners and workers came and settled there. The village developed quickly since then. It was traditionally inhabited by Silesian Lachs, speaking Cieszyn Silesian dialect, and additionally industrial growth lured a large influx of migrant workers, mostly from western Galicia.

According to the censuses conducted in 1880, 1890, 1900 and 1910 the population of the municipality grew from 5,488 in 1880 to 16,808 in 1910. In three censuses majority were Polish-speakers (at least 72.7% in 1880, at most 87.2% in 1900, 82.5% in 1910), accompanied by Czech-speakers (at mat most 16.5% in 1880, dropping to 3.6% in 1900 and growing to 5.2% in 1910) and German-speaking minority (at least 8.1% in 1900, at most 12.1% in 1910). In terms of religion, in 1910 the majority were Roman Catholics (87.4%), followed by Protestants (10.7%), Jews (174 or 1%), and others (151 or 0.9%).

After World War I, fall of Austria-Hungary, Polish–Czechoslovak War and the division of Cieszyn Silesia in 1920, it became a part of Czechoslovakia. In 1923 the village gained town rights. Following the Munich Agreement, in October 1938 together with the Zaolzie region it was annexed by Poland, administratively organised in Frysztat County of Silesian Voivodeship. It was then annexed by Nazi Germany at the beginning of World War II. During the war it was for the first time amalgamated with Freistadt. After the war it was restored to Czechoslovakia, the amalgamation was revoked only to be again adjoined in 1948. As a district it declined heavily in the following decades.

== Landmarks ==
Baroque Saint Peter of Alcantara Church is located there. It was built in 1736. Due to the extensive coal mining in the area, the ground lowered and the church leans 6.8° southwards. The church is now a protected landmark and a memento of the past, reminding the times when coal mining in Karviná was far more extensive. Despite its leaning, the church is still active, with Mass in Czech and Polish languages held each week. Near the church there is an old cemetery.
