= Záblatí (Bohumín) =

Coordinates: 49°53′5″N 18°22′35″E

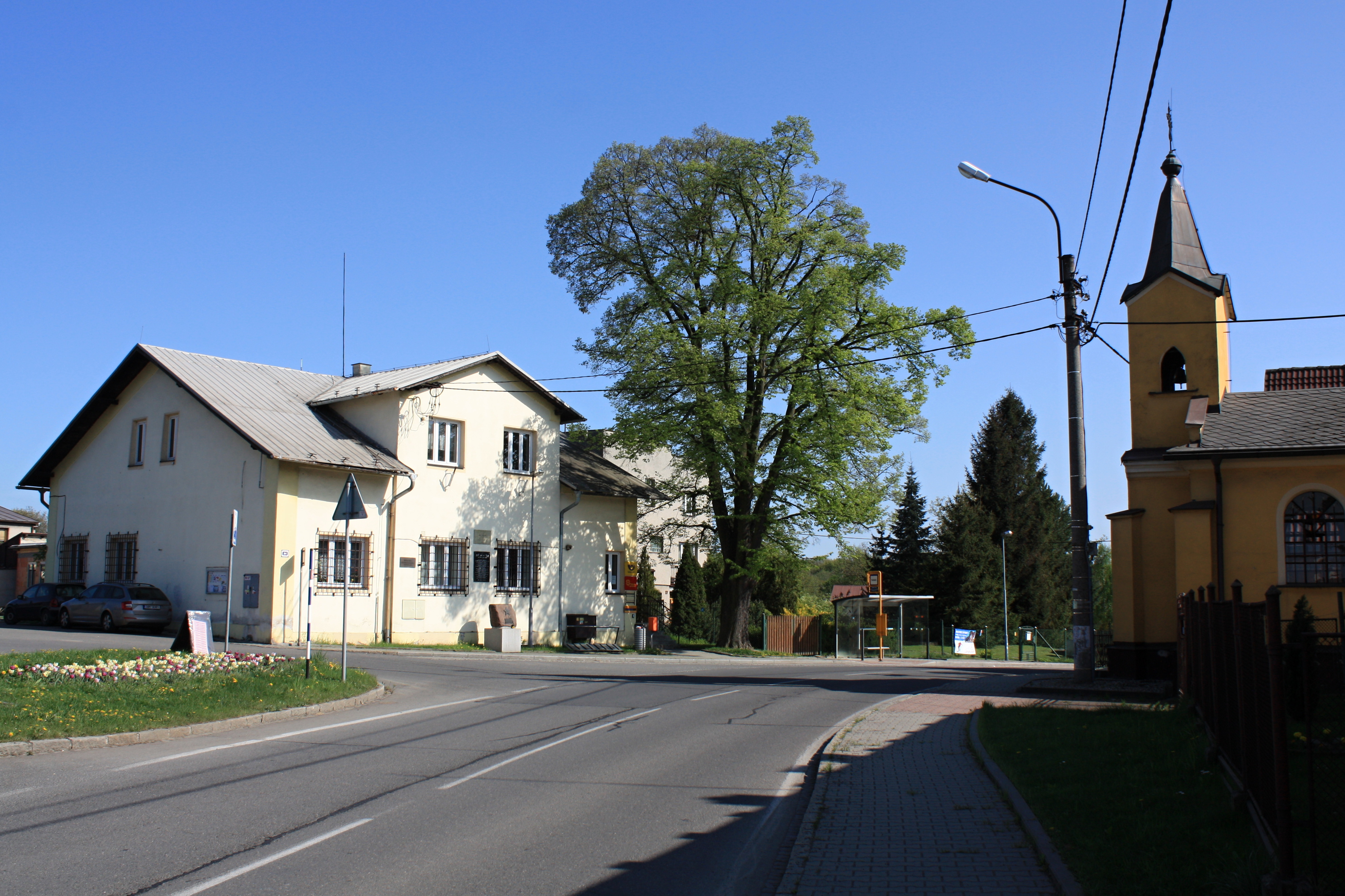
Center of the village

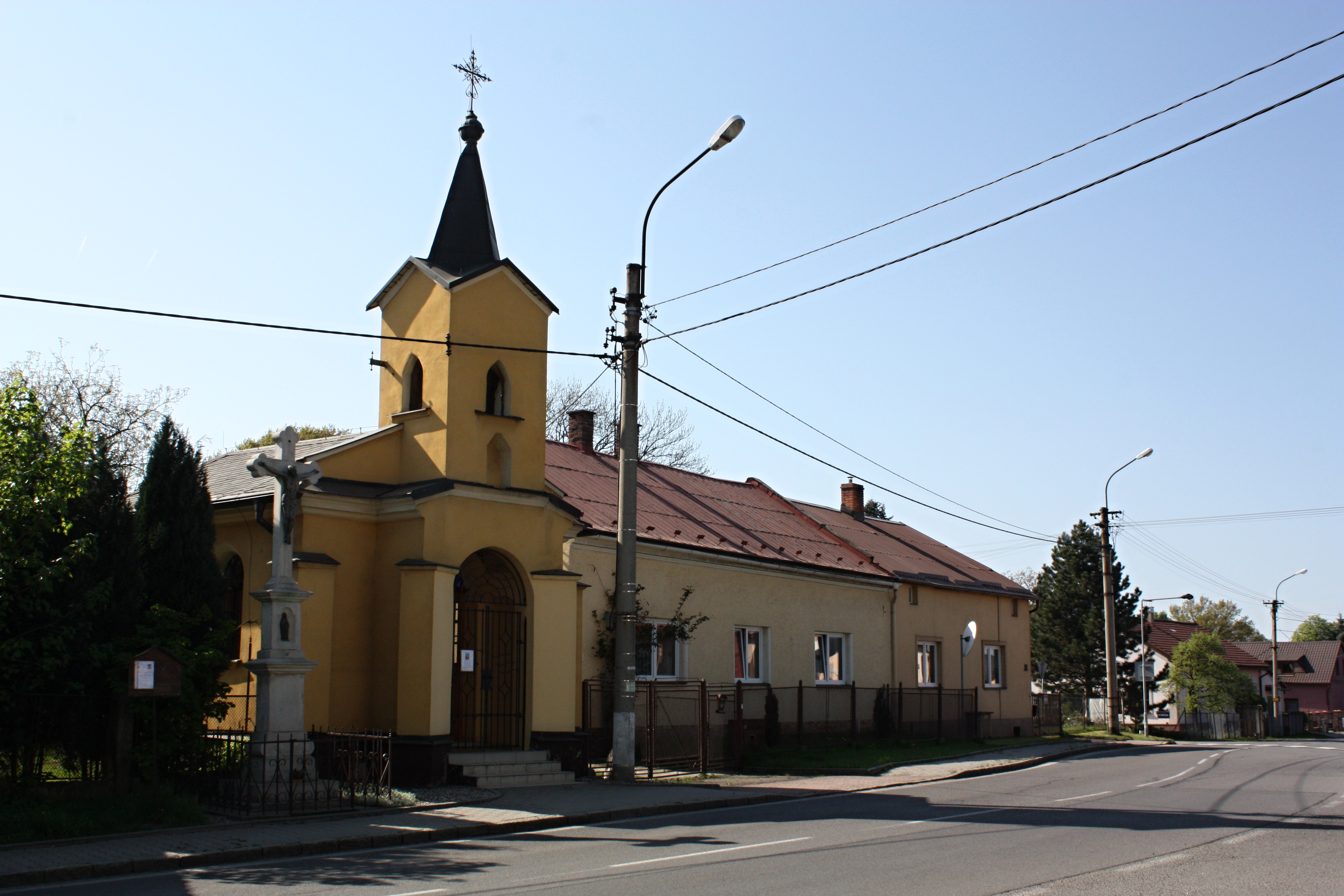
Chapel in the village

Záblatí (Polish: Zabłocie) is a village in Karviná District, Moravian-Silesian Region, Czech Republic. It was a separate municipality but became administratively a part of Bohumín in 1974. It has a population of 2,220 (2022).

== History ==
It is one of the oldest villages in Cieszyn Silesia. It was first mentioned in the document of Pope Gregory IX issued in 1229 among villages belonging to Benedictine abbey in Tyniec, as Zablocie. In 1268 it was bestowed by Władysław Opolski to the newly established Benedictine abbey in Orlová.

Politically it belonged then to the Duchy of Opole and Racibórz and Castellany of Cieszyn, which was in 1290 formed in the process of feudal fragmentation of Poland and was ruled by a local branch of Piast dynasty. In 1327 the duchy became a fee of Kingdom of Bohemia, which after 1526 became part of the Habsburg monarchy.

After World War I, fall of Austria-Hungary, Polish–Czechoslovak War and the division of Cieszyn Silesia in 1920, the village became a part of Czechoslovakia. Following the Munich Agreement, in October 1938 together with the Zaolzie region it was annexed by Poland, administratively organised in Frysztat County of Silesian Voivodeship. The village was then annexed by Nazi Germany at the beginning of World War II. After the war it was restored to Czechoslovakia.

== See also ==
- Polish minority in the Czech Republic
- Zaolzie
