= Nový Bohumín =

- Municipal part of Bohumín
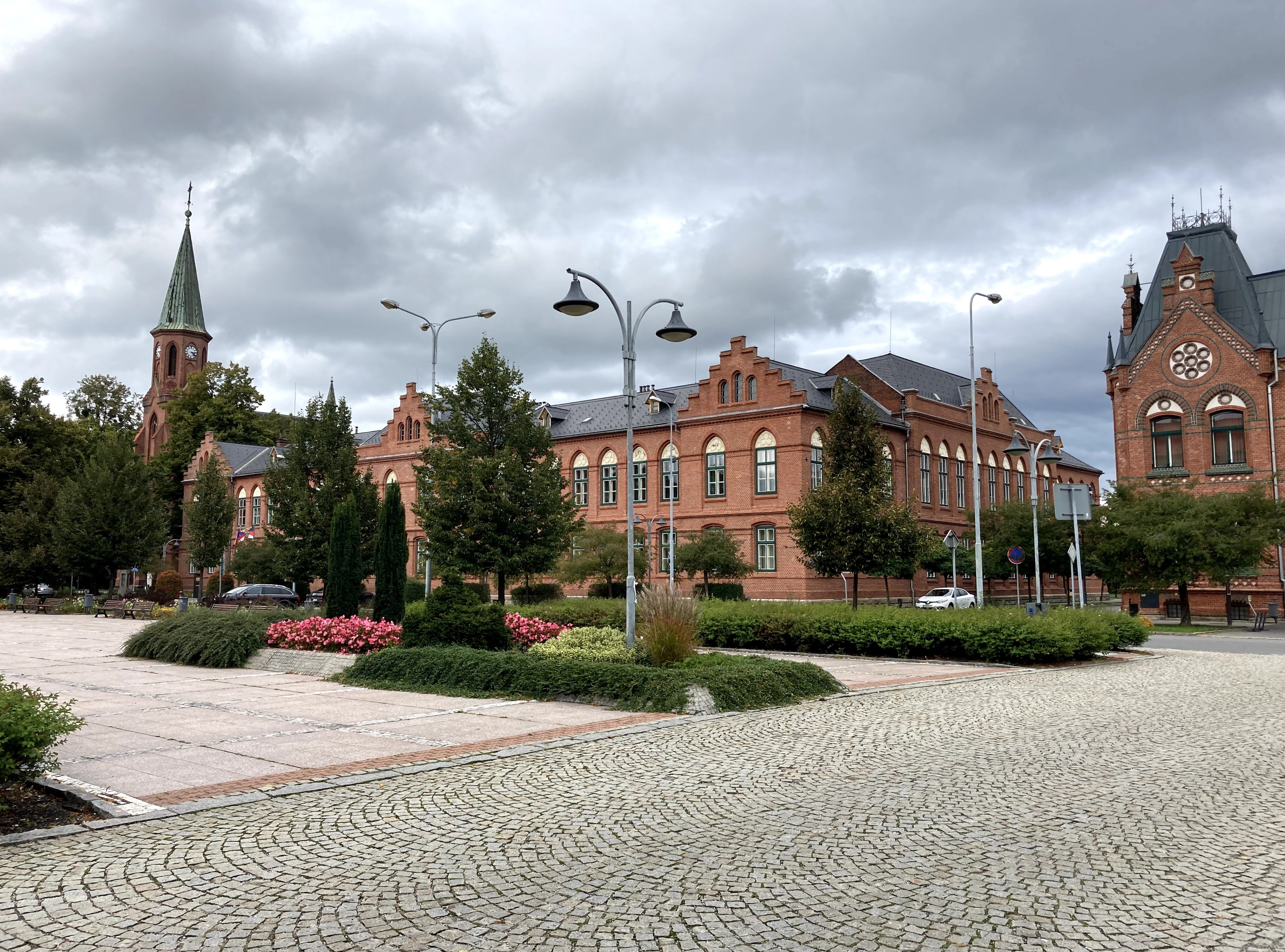
- Masaryk Square and the town hall in Nový Bohumín
- Interactive map of Nový Bohumín
- Coordinates: 49°54′28″N 18°21′34″E
- Country: Czech Republic
- Region: Moravian-Silesian
- District: Karviná
- Municipality: Bohumín

Area
  - Total: 4.65 km^{2} (1.80 sq mi)

Population (2024)
  - Total: 12,420
  - Density: 2,670/km^{2} (6,920/sq mi)
- Time zone: UTC+1 (CET)
  - Summer (DST): UTC+2 (CEST)
- Postal code: 735 81

Nový Bohumín (Polish: Nowy Bogumin; German: Neu Oderberg, lit. 'New Bohumín') is a municipal part of the town of Bohumín in Karviná District in the Moravian-Silesian Region of the Czech Republic. It has a population of 12,420 as of 2024.

== History ==
It is the newest part of today's town of Bohumín. First buildings appeared in the middle of the 19th century, when the Bohumín-Košice railway line was being constructed. Residential houses for workers, as well as industrial buildings were built. At the end of the 19th century and the beginning of the 20th century, several important buildings were built in Neo-Gothic architectural style.

After World War I and the fall of Austria-Hungary, it was contested by reborn Poland and Czechoslovakia, and following the Polish–Czechoslovak War and division of Cieszyn Silesia in 1920, it became a part of Czechoslovakia. The settlement, known as Bohumín-nádraží (Bohumín-train station), was renamed to Nový Bohumín in April 1924. On 16 October 1924 the Czechoslovak government gave the settlement the town rights. Following the Munich Agreement, in October 1938 together with the Zaolzie region it was annexed by Poland, administratively organised in Frysztat County of Silesian Voivodeship. The town was then annexed by Nazi Germany at the beginning of World War II. The German administration operated the E728 forced labour subcamp of the Stalag VIII-B/344 prisoner-of-war camp in Nový Bohumín. After the war it was restored to Czechoslovakia.

Today it forms the largest, as well as most industrialised part of the town of Bohumín.

The most important landmarks are the Catholic Church of the Divine Heart of the Lord from 1896; town hall from 1897–1898; complex of former German schools from 1894–1914; and the Lutheran church from 1901.

== Demographics ==
Historical population

Year	Pop.	±%
1869	876	—
1880	1,532	+74.9%
1890	1,441	−5.9%
1900	4,229	+193.5%
1910	6,837	+61.7%

Year	Pop.	±%
1921	9,368	+37.0%
1930	9,722	+3.8%
1950	8,231	−15.3%
1961	10,864	+32.0%
1970	12,796	+17.8%

Year	Pop.	±%
1980	16,687	+30.4%
1991	16,094	−3.6%
2001	14,438	−10.3%
2011	13,063	−9.5%
2021	12,012	−8.0%

Source: Censuses

== See also ==
- Polish minority in the Czech Republic
- Zaolzie
