= Šunychl =

Coordinates: 49°55′36″N 18°21′16″E

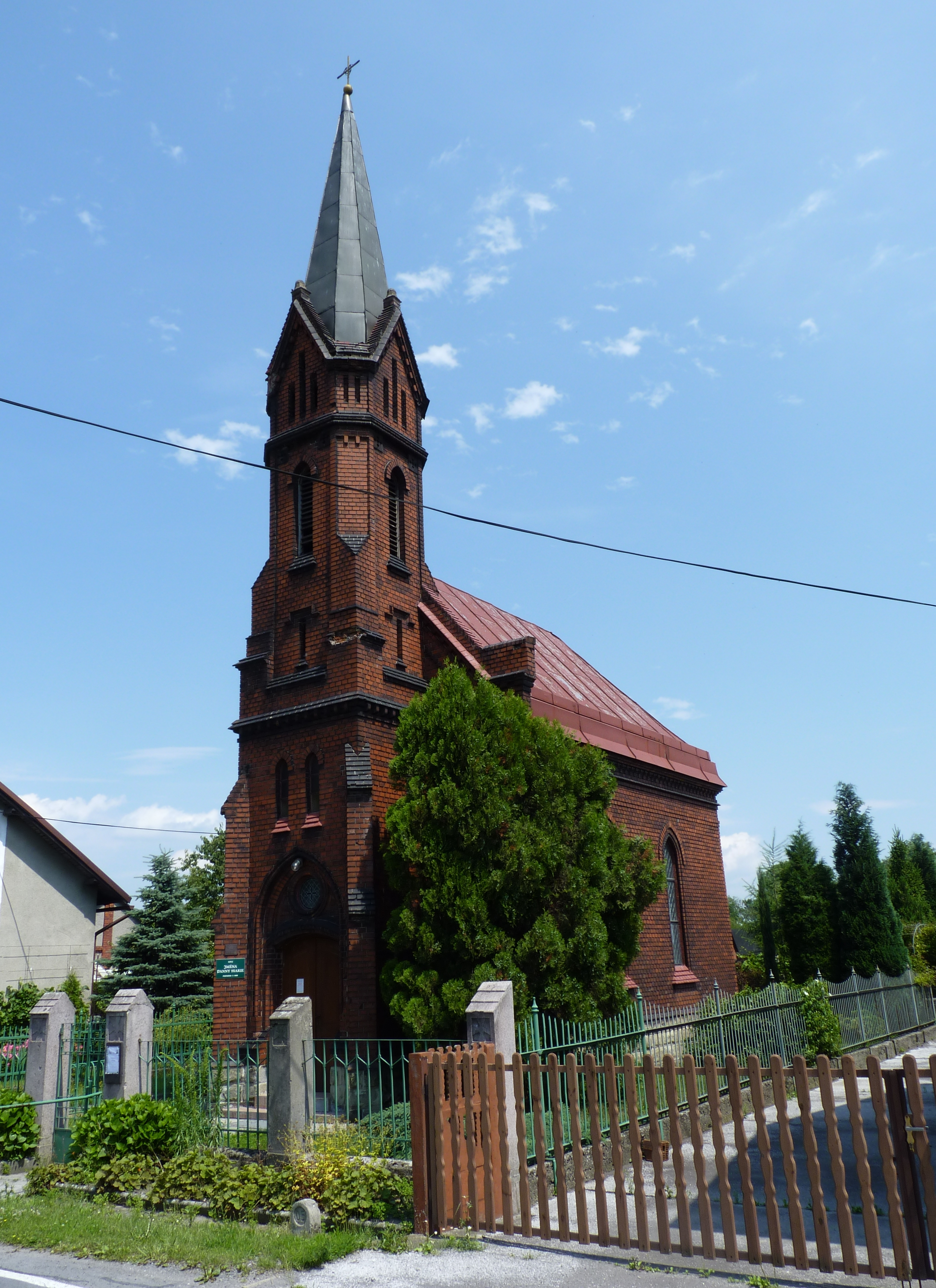
Chapel

Šunychl (Polish: Szonychel, German: Schönichel) is a village in Karviná District, Moravian-Silesian Region, Czech Republic. It was a separate municipality but became administratively a part of Bohumín in 1974. It has a population of 573 (2022) (together with Kopytov). The village lies in the historical region of Cieszyn Silesia.

The village was first mentioned in a written document in 1482.

The settlement of Kopytov (Polish: Kopytów, German: Kapitau) is administratively a part of Šunychl from 1920 and lies on the confluence of the Olza and Odra rivers.

== See also ==
- Polish minority in the Czech Republic
- Zaolzie
