= Frysztat County =

Frysztat County within Silesian Voivodeship

Frysztat County (Polish: Powiat frysztacki) was an administrative territorial entity of the Second Polish Republic. Named after its capital in the town of Frysztat (now Fryštát district of the town Karviná, Czech Republic), it was part of Silesian Voivodeship, and existed from October 1938 until German Invasion of Poland in September 1939. The county had four towns: Frysztat, Bogumin Nowy, Karwina and Orłowa.

In early October 1938, the government in Warsaw sent an ultimatum to Prague, demanding the return of the region of Trans-Olza, which the Czechs had annexed in 1919-20. Czechoslovak government agreed, and units of the Polish Army entered the region, annexing an area of 801.5 km2 with a population of 227,399 people. Polish government divided Trans-Olza into two counties – Frysztat and West Cieszyn. On 27 October 1938, Frysztat County officially became part of Silesian Voivodeship, on the same day, West Cieszyn County was merged with Cieszyn County.

On 31 January 1939, Frysztat County was expanded by the gminas of Gruszów, Hermanice, Michałkowice, Radwanice and Ostrawa Śląska. Also, some smaller territorial changes were introduced.

The process of legal integration of Trans-Olza into Poland was never completed, as on 1 September 1939 German invaded Poland, and after the war, the region returned to Czechoslovakia.

== Municipalities of the Frysztat County in 1938–1939 ==
1. Bogumin
2. Bogumin Nowy
3. Darków
4. Dąbrowa
5. Dziećmorowice
6. Frysztat
7. Karwina
8. Lutynia Niemiecka
9. Lutynia Polska
10. Łazy
11. Łąki
12. Marklowice Dolne
13. Olbrachcice
14. Orłowa
15. Piersna
16. Pietwałd
17. Piotrowice
18. Poręba
19. Pudłów
20. Raj
21. Rychwałd
22. Skrzeczoń
23. Stare Miasto
24. Stonawa
25. Sucha Dolna
26. Sucha Górna
27. Sucha Średnia
28. Wierzbica
29. Wierzniowice
30. Zabłocie
31. Zawada
