= Bohumín =

- Town
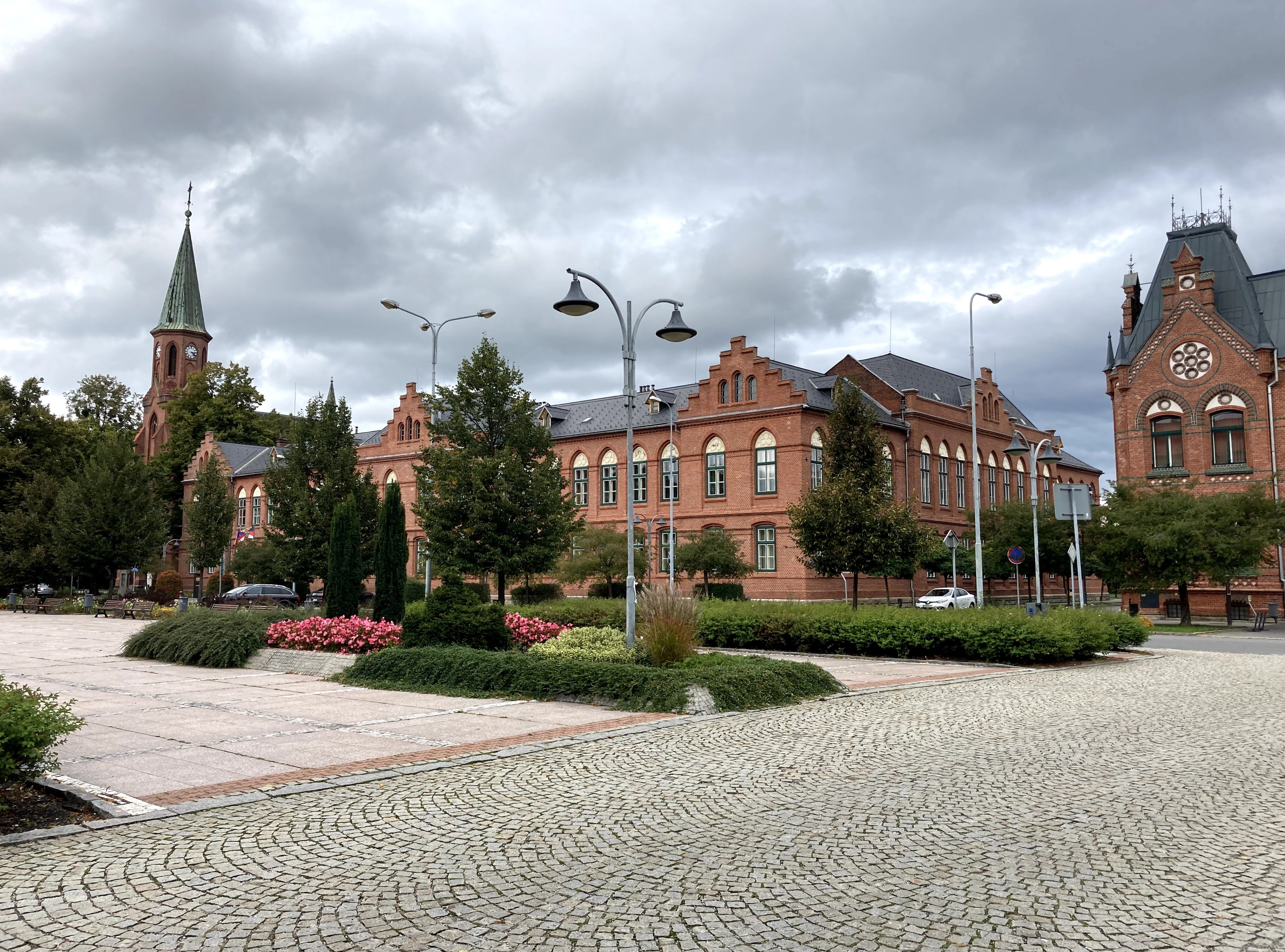
- The square Náměstí T. G. Masaryka

- Flag Coat of arms

- Location in the Czech Republic
- Coordinates: 49°54′15″N 18°21′27″E
- Country: Czech Republic
- Region: Moravian-Silesian
- District: Karviná
- First mentioned: 1262

Government
  - Mayor: Lumír Macura (SOCDEM)

Area
  - Total: 31.03 km^{2} (11.98 sq mi)
- Elevation: 198 m (650 ft)

Population (2026-01-01)
  - Total: 20,234
  - Density: 652.1/km^{2} (1,689/sq mi)
- Time zone: UTC+1 (CET)
  - Summer (DST): UTC+2 (CEST)
- Postal codes: 735 31, 735 51, 735 52, 735 81
- Website: www.mesto-bohumin.cz

Bohumín (Czech pronunciation: [ˈboɦumiːn]; Polish: Bogumin, German: Oderberg) is a town in Karviná District in the Moravian-Silesian Region of the Czech Republic. It has about 20,000 inhabitants. The town is located in the Ostrava Basin at the confluence of the Oder and Olza rivers, on the border with Poland. It is among the most important railway junctions in the Czech Republic. Among the most important monuments in Bohumín are the Church of the Nativity of the Virgin Mary and the Church of the Sacred Heart.

== Administrative division ==
Bohumín consists of seven municipal parts (in brackets population according to the 2021 census):

- Nový Bohumín (12,012)
- Starý Bohumín (1,348)
- Pudlov (1,046)
- Skřečoň (2,502)
- Šunychl (574)
- Vrbice (433)
- Záblatí (2,123)

== Etymology ==
The name is derived from the personal name Bohum/Bohuma or Bogum/Boguma, which are pet forms of the Czech name Bohumil and the Polish name Bogumił. It was probably the founder or an early owner of the settlement. Because in some Czech dialects the sound "h" is replaced by "g", it is not certain whether the settlement's name was derived from the Czech or Polish given name.

== Geography ==
Bohumín is located about 5 kilometres (3 mi) north of Ostrava, on the border with Poland in the historical region of Cieszyn Silesia. It lies in the Ostrava Basin.

The confluence of the Oder and Olza rivers is situated north of the town. The Oder forms the western border of the municipal territory and the Olza forms the northern border with Poland.

The area is rich in water bodies. The artificial lakes Velké Kališovo jezero and Malé Kališovo jezero with a total area of 50 ha (120 acres) and Vrbické jezero were created by flooding gravel quarries. They are used for recreational purposes. There is also the fishpond Záblatský rybník in the southern part of the territory.

== History ==
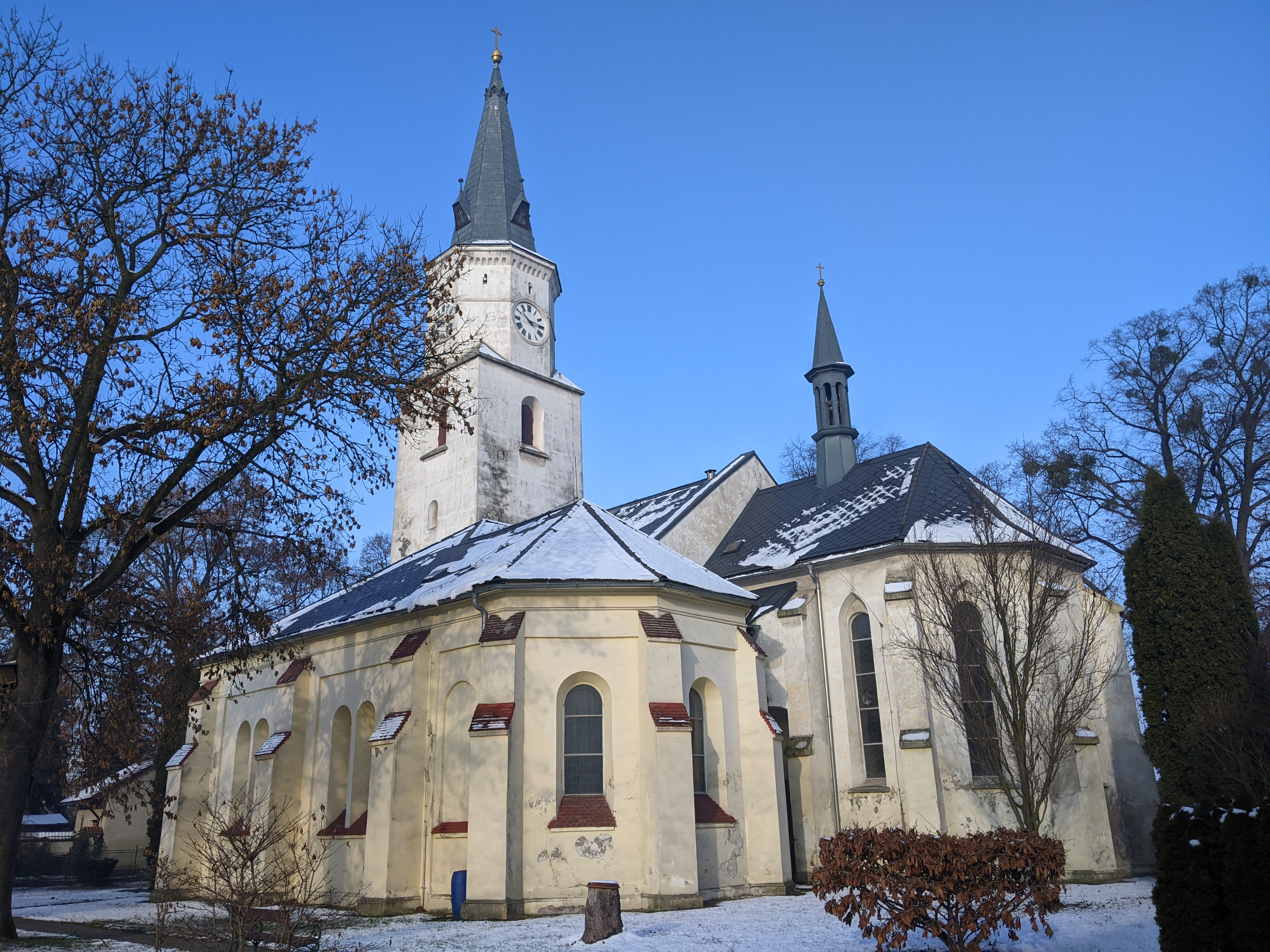
Church of the Nativity of the Virgin Mary

The first written mention of Bohumín (as Bogun) is in a stylistic exercise of Queen Kunigunda of Halych written in 1256–1262. It was described as a large village. It was located on a trade route from Prague to Kraków. Until the 16th century, the owners of Bohumín often changed.

In 1523, the Bohumín estate was bought by George, Margrave of Brandenburg-Ansbach, a member of the Hohenzollern family. During the rule by the Hohenzollerns, the region experienced great development. The population reoriented to Protestantism and was Germanised. The last Hohenzollern who owned Bohumín was Johann Georg von Brandenburg. After his properties were confiscated in 1622, the town was acquired by Lazar Henckel of Donnersmarkt, a banker and entrepreneur from Vienna. His descendants and relatives ruled Bohumín until the end of the mid-18th century, then it was bought by the Lichnowsky family.

In the 19th century, Bohumín was owned by the Gusnar family and by Count Rudnický. After the Revolutions of 1848 in the Austrian Empire a modern municipal division was introduced in the re-established Austrian Silesia. The town became a seat of a legal district at first in Friedek and since 1868 in the Freistadt political district. Thanks to the construction of the Košice–Bohumín Railway and ironworks, the surrounding municipalities, especially Šunychl and Pudlov (today parts of Bohumín) flourished and the importance of the old town (today known as Starý Bohumín, i.e. 'old Bohumín') declined.

According to the censuses conducted in 1880–1910, the population of the town grew from 1,839 in 1880 to 5,810 in 1910. In 1880 and 1890 the majority were Polish-speakers (58.1% in 1880 and 64.8% in 1890), followed by German-speakers (34.8% in 1880 and 27.6% in 1890) and Czech-speakers (6.9% in 1880 and 7.6% in 1890). In 1900 and 1910 the majority were German-speakers (52.8% in 1900, 54.5% in 1910), followed by Polish-speakers (41.7% in 1900 and 38.2% in 1910) and Czech-speakers (5.3% in 1900 and 7.3% in 1910). In terms of religion, in 1910 the majority were Roman Catholics (91.7%), followed by Protestants (206 or 3.5%), Jews (129 or 2.2%) and others (141 or 2.6%).

After the division of Cieszyn Silesia in 1920, the town became part of Czechoslovakia. Following the Munich Agreement, Bohumín and the Trans-Olza region were annexed by Poland in October 1938. The town was then annexed by Nazi Germany at the beginning of World War II. The Germans operated several forced labour camps in the town, including a Polenlager camp solely for Poles, a camp solely for Jews, and the E728 subcamp of the Stalag VIII-B/344 prisoner-of-war camp in Nový Bohumín. On 1 May 1945, Bohumín was taken by Soviet troops of the 1st Guards Army. After the war, it was restored to Czechoslovakia and the remaining German-speaking population was expelled in accordance to the Potsdam Agreement.

== Demographics ==
The majority of citizens are Czech; many citizens have Polish ancestry, although the Polish minority in Bohumín was only 1.6% as of census 2021. Before World War II, the town was inhabited by a large German community.

Historical population

Year	Pop.	±%
1869	4,515	—
1880	5,448	+20.7%
1890	6,414	+17.7%
1900	13,297	+107.3%
1910	19,572	+47.2%

Year	Pop.	±%
1921	23,289	+19.0%
1930	25,408	+9.1%
1950	19,705	−22.4%
1961	21,833	+10.8%
1970	22,223	+1.8%

Year	Pop.	±%
1980	25,177	+13.3%
1991	23,686	−5.9%
2001	23,284	−1.7%
2011	21,649	−7.0%
2021	20,038	−7.4%

Source: Censuses

== Transport ==
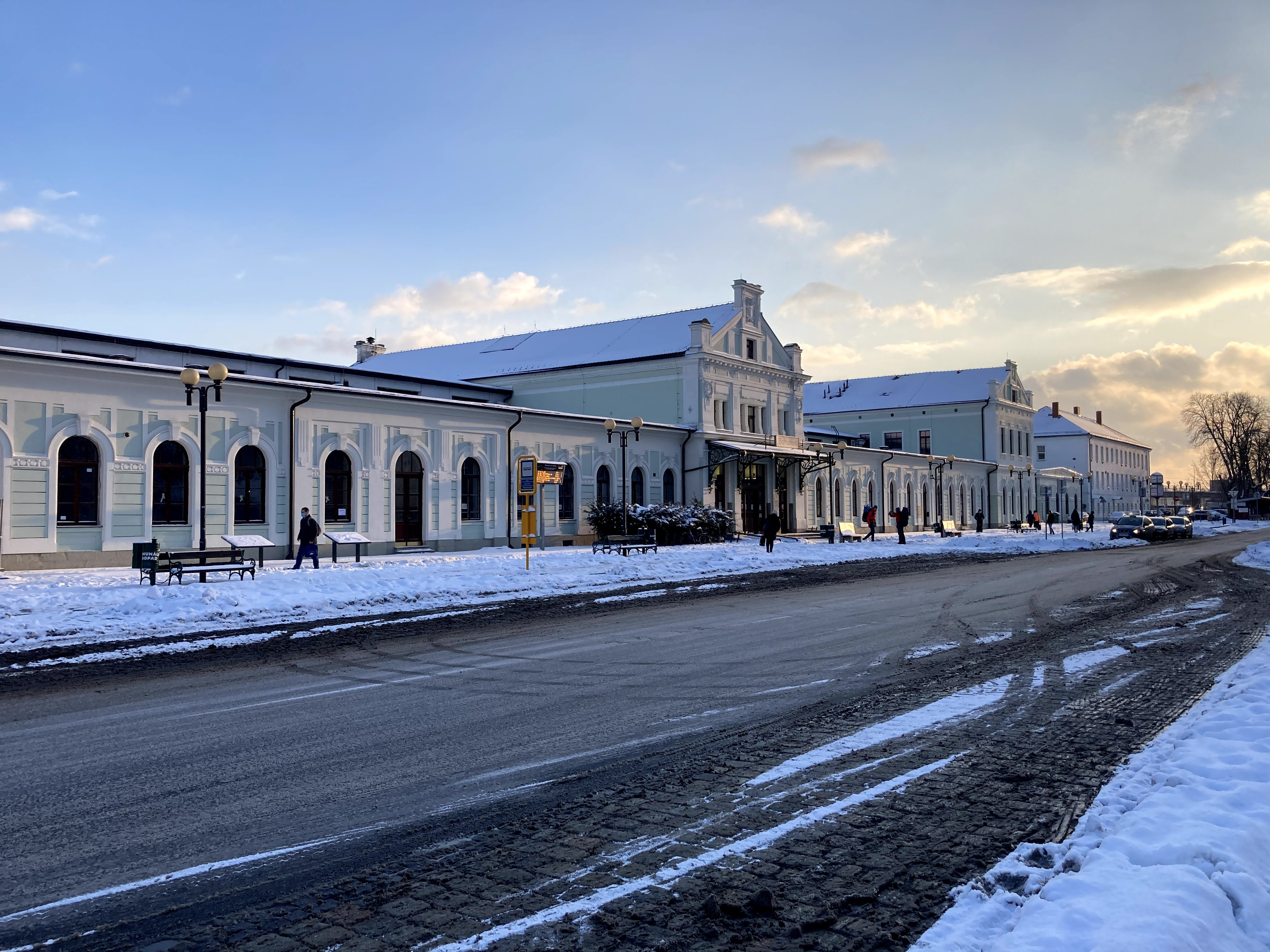
Main train station

Bohumín is one of the most important railway junctions in the Czech Republic. Several major international lines pass through the town and Bohumín has the direct connection with many European capitals. Some of the lines were built by the Emperor Ferdinand Northern Railway company. Lines going through Bohumín include: Bohumín–Olomouc–Prague, Bohumín–Brno, Bohumín–Žilina–Vrútky, Bohumín–Košice, Bohumín–Bratislava–Budapest, Bohumín–Vienna–Graz, Bohumín–Warsaw–Gdańsk–Gdynia, Bohumín–Kraków–Przemyśl, and Bohumín–Wrocław–Berlin. There is also an important depot of České dráhy in Bohumín.

LEO Express operates bus services to Polish cities of Katowice and Kraków.

The D1 motorway runs through the town.

There are the Bohumín / Chałupki railway border crossing and Bohumín / Nowe Chałupki road border crossing to Poland.

== Sights ==
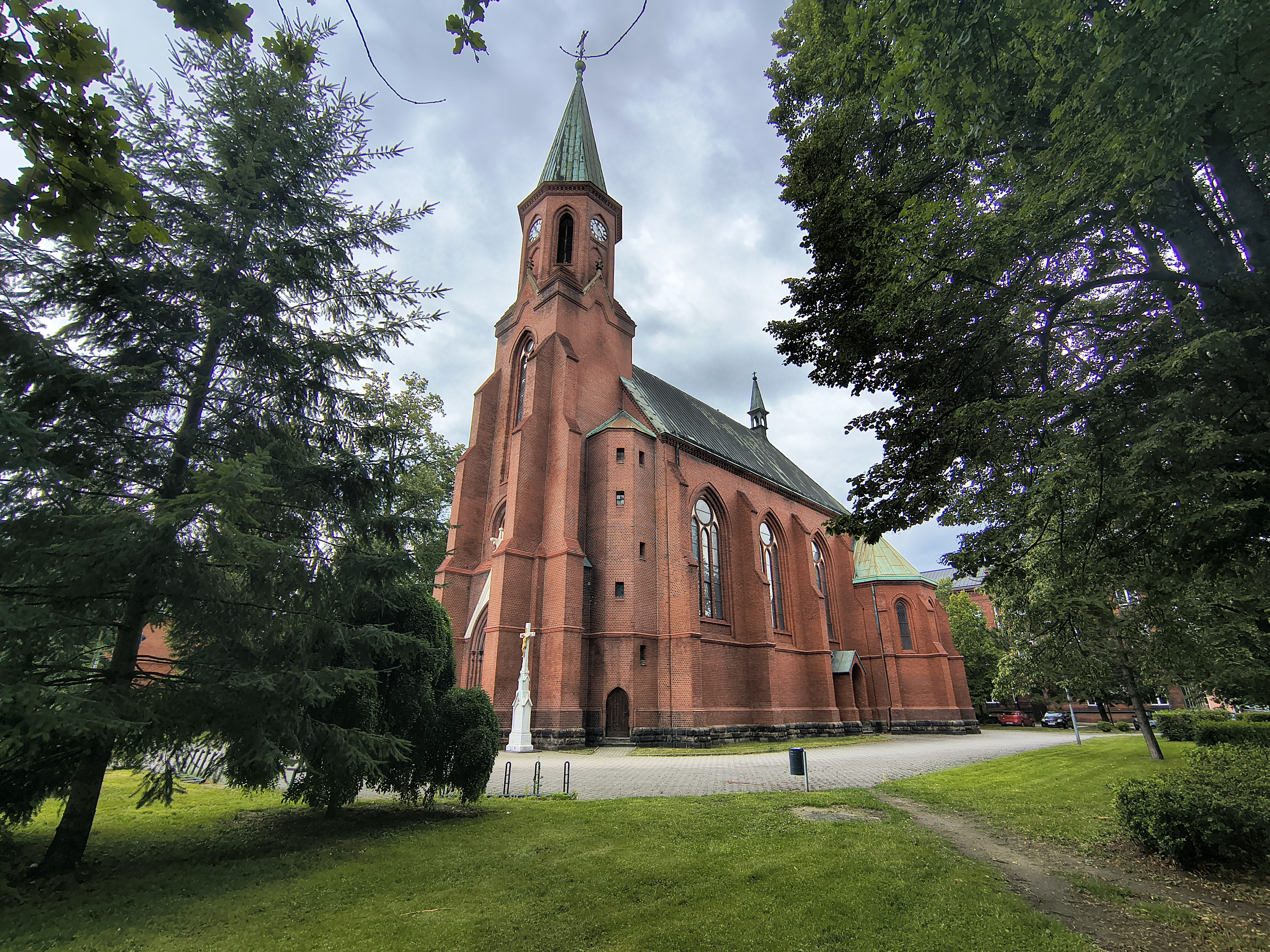
Church of the Sacred Heart

The oldest monument of Bohumín is the Church of the Nativity of the Virgin Mary in Old Bohumín. The church was built in the Gothic style in the 14th century on the site of an old chapel. In the second half of the 17th century, the church was extended by two chapels. After a fire in 1850, Baroque modifications were made. Its current form is the result of reconstruction in 1910–1911. Next to the church is a tomb of the Henckel family, former owners of Bohumín.

The most important landmark of Nový Bohumín is the Church of the Sacred Heart. This Catholic neo-Gothic church was built in 1892–1894. Its appearance is characterised by red unplastered bricks. The Lutheran church in Nový Bohumín was built in 1900–1901. It was also built in the neo-Gothic style and is also protected as a cultural monument.

A notable building in Nový Bohumín is the town hall. It was completed in 1898 and a square was established in front of the building in the same year. In 1953, the building was turned into a medical centre. Since 2005, part of the municipal office has again been located there.

The Church of Saint Catherine in Vrbice was built in 1910–1913. It is a large historicist church with a tall prismatic tower.

The Church of Our Lady of Seven Sorrows in Skřečoň is also a historicist building, built in 1912–1924. Its part is a chapel, which probably dates from the end of the 19th century.

== Notable people ==
- Svatopluk Havelka (1925–2009), composer
- Tomáš Pospíchal (1936–2003), footballer
- Svatopluk Němeček (born 1972), politician
- Tereza Bebarová (born 1975), actress

== Twin towns – sister cities ==
Bohumín is twinned with:

- Gorzyce, Poland
- Prudnik, Poland
