= Civic Defence =

Czech paramilitary organisation

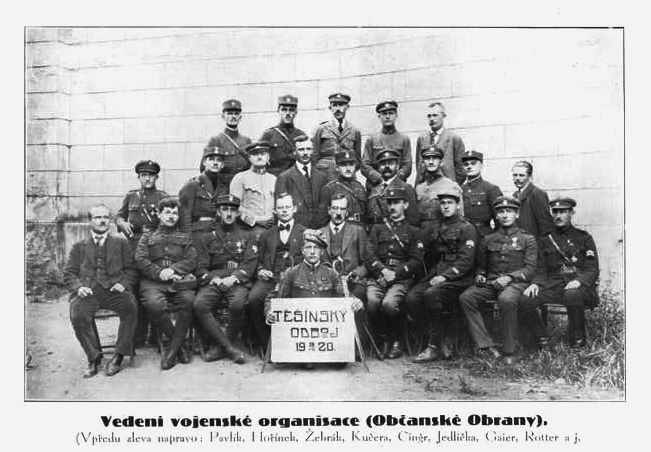
Leadership of the Civic Defence

Civic Defence (Czech: Občanská obrana) was a Czech paramilitary organisation active on the territory of Cieszyn Silesia during the so-called plebiscite period of the Polish–Czechoslovak dispute over Cieszyn Silesia (1919–1920).

== Organisational structure ==
The Civic Defence was created based on the system of the so-called fives: in each municipality there was one trustee who directed five persons he selected. Each such selected person further selected in a similar way five other persons an so on.

Later in time the Civic Defence was rebuilt on a military basis and became substantially stronger. The head of the organisation was captain Kučera of Orlová and lieutenant Cingr of Ostrava, for a certain period of time it was led also by major Uvíra of Kroměříž.

The Civic Defence was active also on the Polish side of the demarcation line, led by captain Puckman of Cieszyn.

== Declared goals ==
The declared goals of the Civic Defence were defence against the attacks of Polish guerrillas and support of Czechoslovak gendarmerie, defence of the Czechoslovak-Polish demarcation line against Polish incursions and, in case of Polish invasion, holding back of Polish advance until the arrival of Czechoslovak troops.
