= Trans-Olza =

Historic region of the Czech Republic

Coordinates: 49°45′N 18°30′E

Trans-Olza (Polish: Zaolzie, [zaˈɔlʑɛ]; Czech: Záolží, Záolší; German: Olsa-Gebiet), also known as Trans-Olza Silesia (Polish: Śląsk Zaolziański), is a territory in the Czech Republic which was disputed between Poland and Czechoslovakia during the interwar period. Its name comes from the Olza River.

The history of the Trans-Olza region began in 1918 when, after the collapse of Austria-Hungary, the newly-established Czechoslovakia claimed the area, which was mainly inhabited by Poles. Poland maintained control over the region and began to hold elections, to which Czechoslovakia responded by invading and annexing the territory in January 1919.

The area as it is known today was created in 1920, when Cieszyn Silesia was divided between the two countries during the Spa Conference. Trans-Olza forms the eastern part of the Czech portion of Cieszyn Silesia. The division did not satisfy either side, and persisting conflict over the region led to its annexation by Poland in October 1938, following the German invasion of Czechoslovakia. After the German-Soviet invasion of Poland in 1939, the area became a part of Nazi Germany until 1945. After the war, the 1920 borders were restored.

Historically, the largest specified ethnic group inhabiting this area were Poles. Under Austrian rule, Cieszyn Silesia was initially divided into three districts (Bielitz, Friedek and Teschen), and later into four, by adding Freistadt. One of them, Frýdek, had a mostly Czech population, the other three were mostly inhabited by Poles. During the 19th century the number of ethnic Germans grew. After declining at the end of the 19th century, at the beginning of the 20th century and later from 1920 to 1938, the Czech population grew significantly to rival the Poles. Another significant ethnic group were the Jews, but almost the entire Jewish population was murdered during World War II by Nazi Germany.

In addition to the Polish, Czech and German national orientations there was a group claiming Silesian national identity, separate from the other three. This group enjoyed popular support throughout Cieszyn Silesia, though its strongest supporters were among the Protestants in the eastern part of Cieszyn Silesia (now part of Poland), not in Trans-Olza itself.

== Name and territory ==
The Polish term Zaolzie (meaning "lands beyond the Olza") is used predominantly in Poland and by the Polish minority living in the territory. It is also often used by foreign scholars, e.g. American ethnolinguist Kevin Hannan. The term Zaolzie was first used in 1930s by Polish writer Paweł Hulka-Laskowski. In Czech it is mainly referred to as České Těšínsko/Českotěšínsko ("land around Český Těšín"), or as Těšínsko or Těšínské Slezsko (meaning Cieszyn Silesia). The Czech equivalent of Zaolzie (Zaolší or Zaolží) is rarely used. The term Zaolzie denotes the territory of the former districts of Český Těšín and Fryštát, in which the Polish population formed a majority according to the 1910 Austrian census. It makes up the eastern part of the Czech portion of Cieszyn Silesia. However, Polish historian Józef Szymeczek notes that the term is often mistakenly used for the whole Czech part of Cieszyn Silesia.

Since the 1960 reform of administrative divisions of Czechoslovakia, Trans-Olza has consisted of Karviná District and the eastern part of Frýdek-Místek District.

== History ==
After the Migration Period the area was settled by West Slavs, which were later organized into the Golensizi tribe. The tribe had a large and important gord situated in contemporary Chotěbuz. In the 880s or the early 890s the gord was raided and burned, most probably by an army of Svatopluk I of Moravia, and afterwards the area could have been subjugated by Great Moravia, which is however questioned by historians like Zdeněk Klanica, Idzi Panic, Stanisław Szczur.

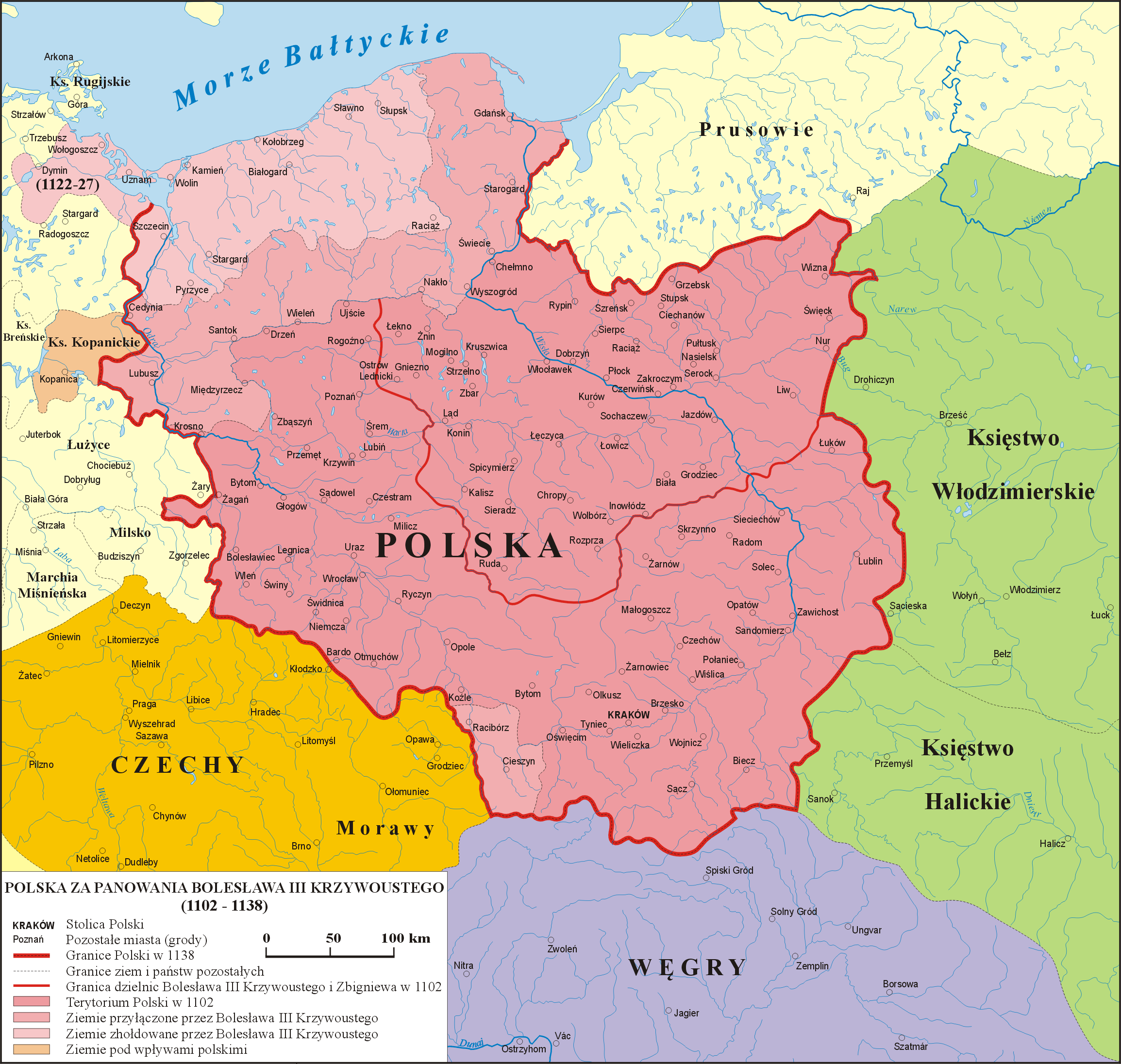
Silesia as a part of Poland during the Piast dynasty

After the fall of Great Moravia in 907 the area could have been under the influence of Bohemian rulers. In the late 10th century Poland, ruled by Bolesław I Chrobry, began to contend for the region, which was crossed by important international routes. From 950 to 1060 it was under the rule of Bohemia, and from 1060 it was part of the Piast Kingdom of Poland. The written history explicitly about the region begins on 23 April 1155 when Cieszyn/Těšín was first mentioned in a written document, a letter from Pope Adrian IV issued for Walter, Bishop of Wrocław, where it was listed amongst other centres of castellanies. The castellany was then a part of Duchy of Silesia. In 1172 it became a part of Duchy of Racibórz, and from 1202 of Duchy of Opole and Racibórz. In the first half of the 13th century the Moravian settlement organised by Arnold von Hückeswagen from Starý Jičín castle and later accelerated by Bruno von Schauenburg, Bishop of Olomouc, began to press close to Silesian settlements. This prompted signing of a special treaty between Duke Vladislaus I of Opole and King Ottokar II of Bohemia on December 1261 which regulated a local border between their states along the Ostravice River. In order to strengthen the border Władysław of Opole decided to found Orlová monastery in 1268. In the continued process of feudal fragmentation of Poland the Castellany of Cieszyn was eventually transformed in 1290 into the Duchy of Cieszyn, which in 1327 became an autonomic fiefdom of the Bohemian crown. Upon the death of Elizabeth Lucretia, its last ruler from the Polish Piast dynasty in 1653, it passed directly to the Bohemian kings from the Habsburg dynasty. When most of Silesia was conquered by Prussian king Frederick the Great in 1742, the Cieszyn region was part of the small southern portion that was retained by the Habsburg Monarchy (Austrian Silesia).

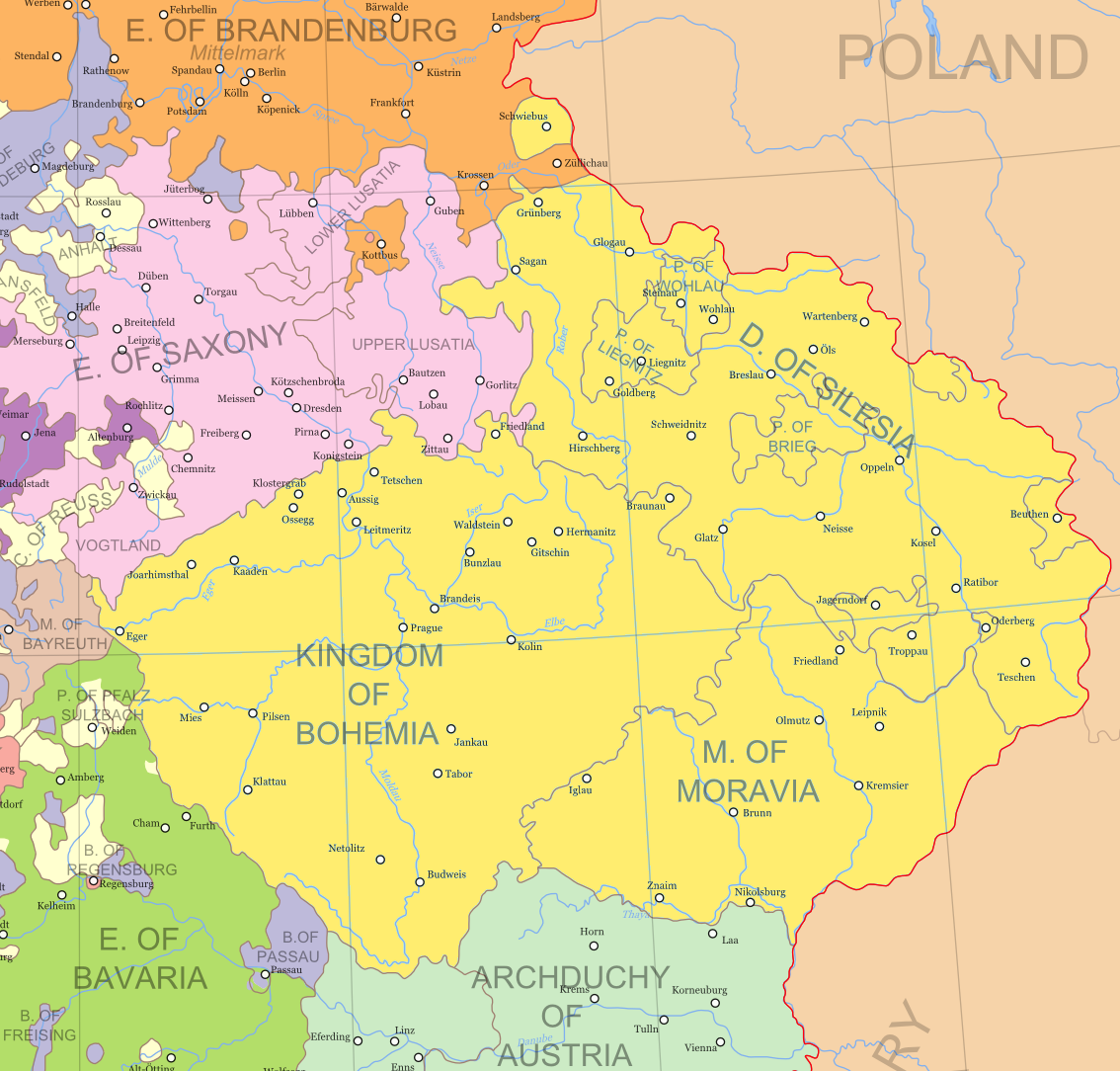
Lands of the Bohemian Crown within Habsburg Empire between 1635 and 1742, before most of Silesia was ceded to Prussia

Up to the mid-19th century members of the local Slav population did not identify themselves as members of larger ethnolinguistic entities. In Cieszyn Silesia (as in all West Slavic borderlands) various territorial identities pre-dated ethnic and national identity. Consciousness of membership within a greater Polish or Czech nation spread slowly in Silesia.

From 1848 to the end of the 19th century, local Polish and Czech people co-operated, united against the Germanizing tendencies of the Austrian Empire and later of Austria-Hungary. At the end of the century, ethnic tensions arose as the area's economic significance grew. This growth caused a wave of immigration from Galicia. About 60,000 people arrived between 1880 and 1910. The new immigrants were Polish and poor, about half of them being illiterate. They worked in coal mining and metallurgy. For these people the most important factor was material well-being; they cared little about the homeland from which they had fled. Almost all of them assimilated into the Czech population. Many of them settled in Ostrava (west of the ethnic border), as heavy industry was spread through the whole western part of Cieszyn Silesia. Even today, ethnographers find that about 25,000 people in Ostrava (about 8% of the population) have Polish surnames. The Czech population (living mainly in the northern part of the area: Bohumín, Orlová, etc.) declined numerically at the end of the 19th century, assimilating with the prevalent Polish population. This process shifted with the industrial boom in the area.

Distribution of population by language in the Duchy of Teschen according to the Austrian census 1910

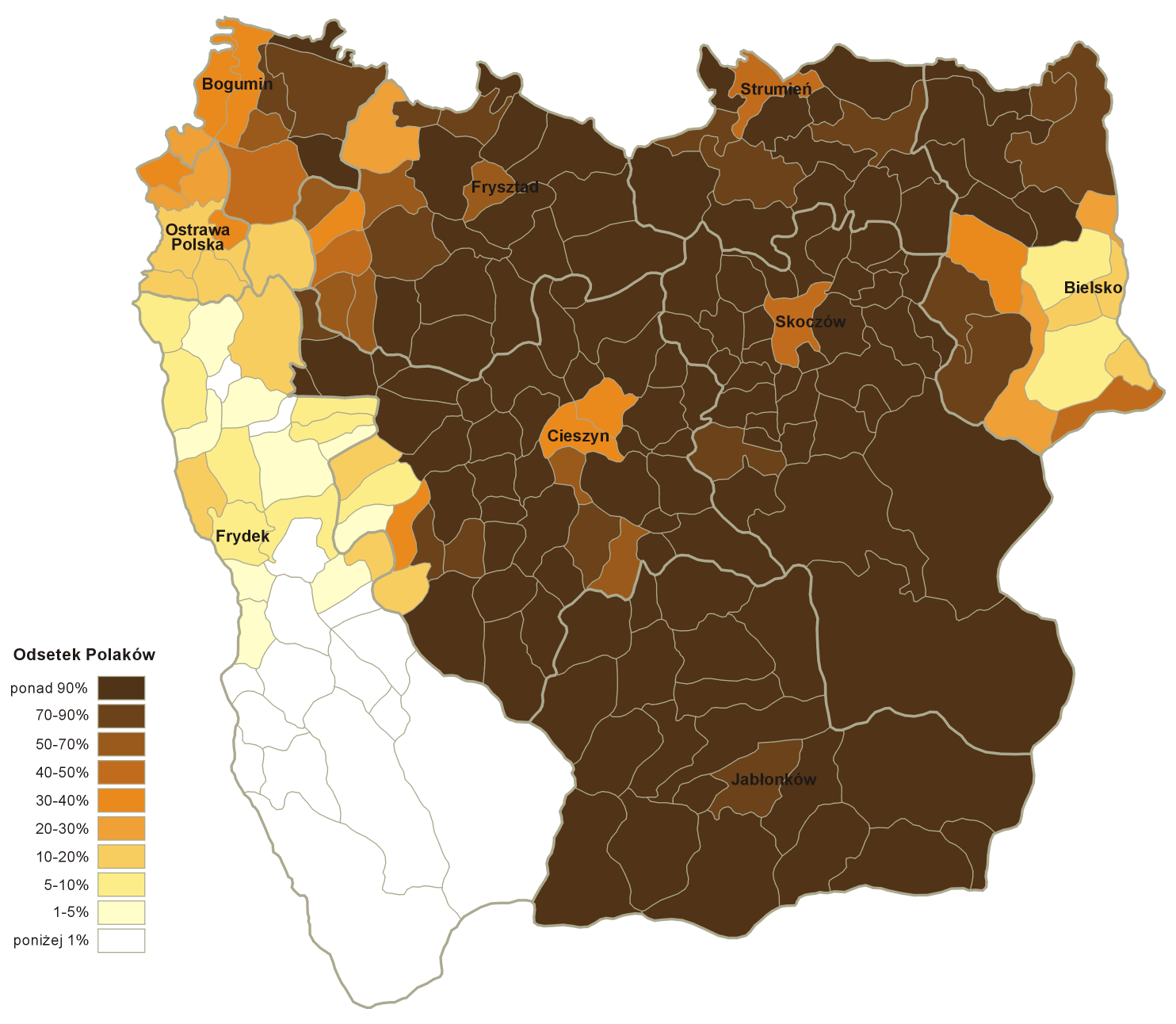
Polish-speaking population in the Duchy of Teschen in 1910

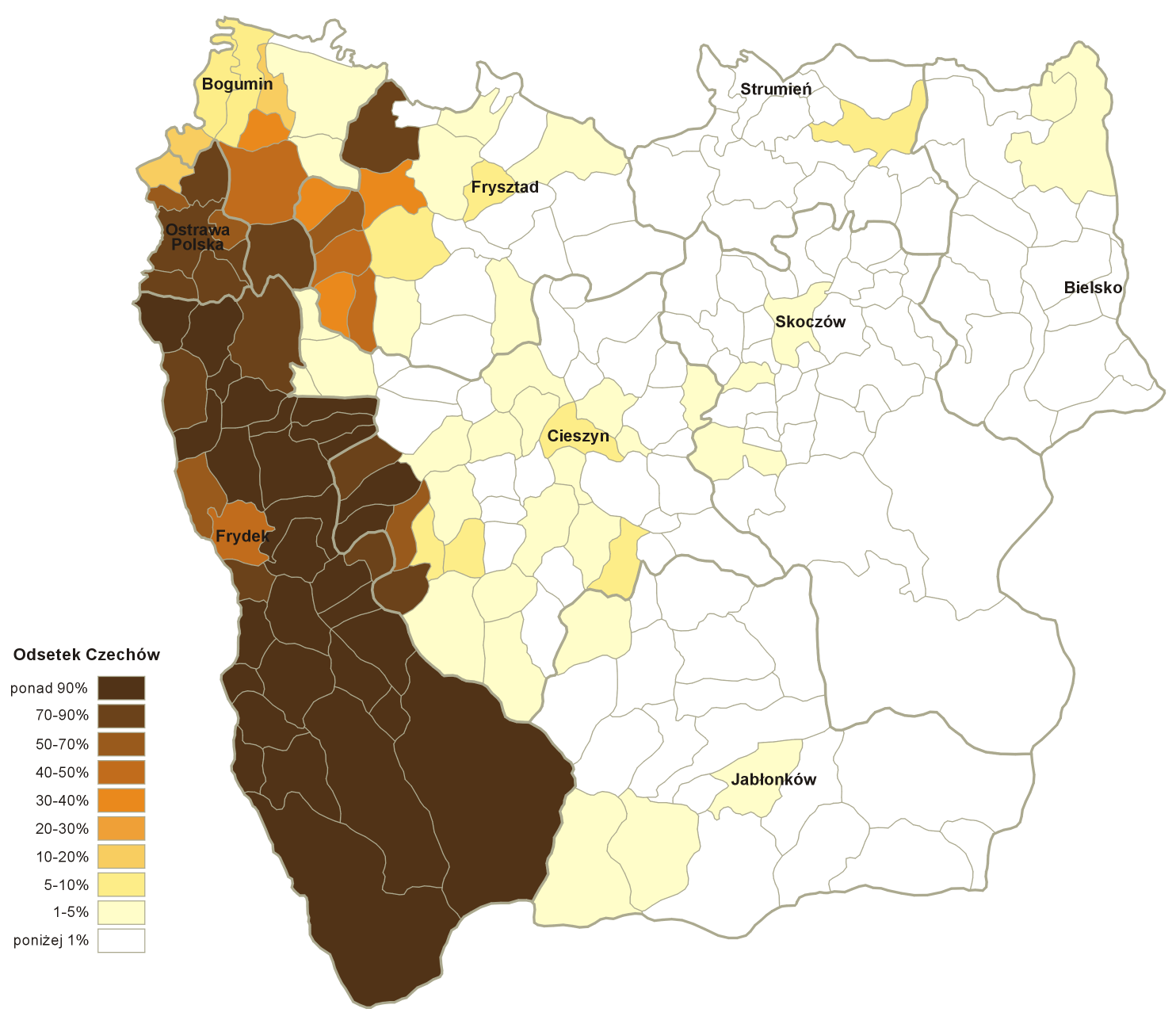
Czech-speaking population in the Duchy of Teschen in 1910

=== Decision time (1918–1920) ===
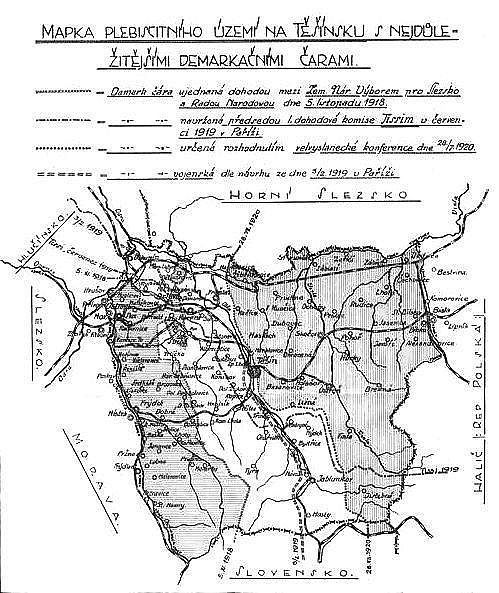
Map of the plebiscite area of Cieszyn Silesia with various demarcation lines

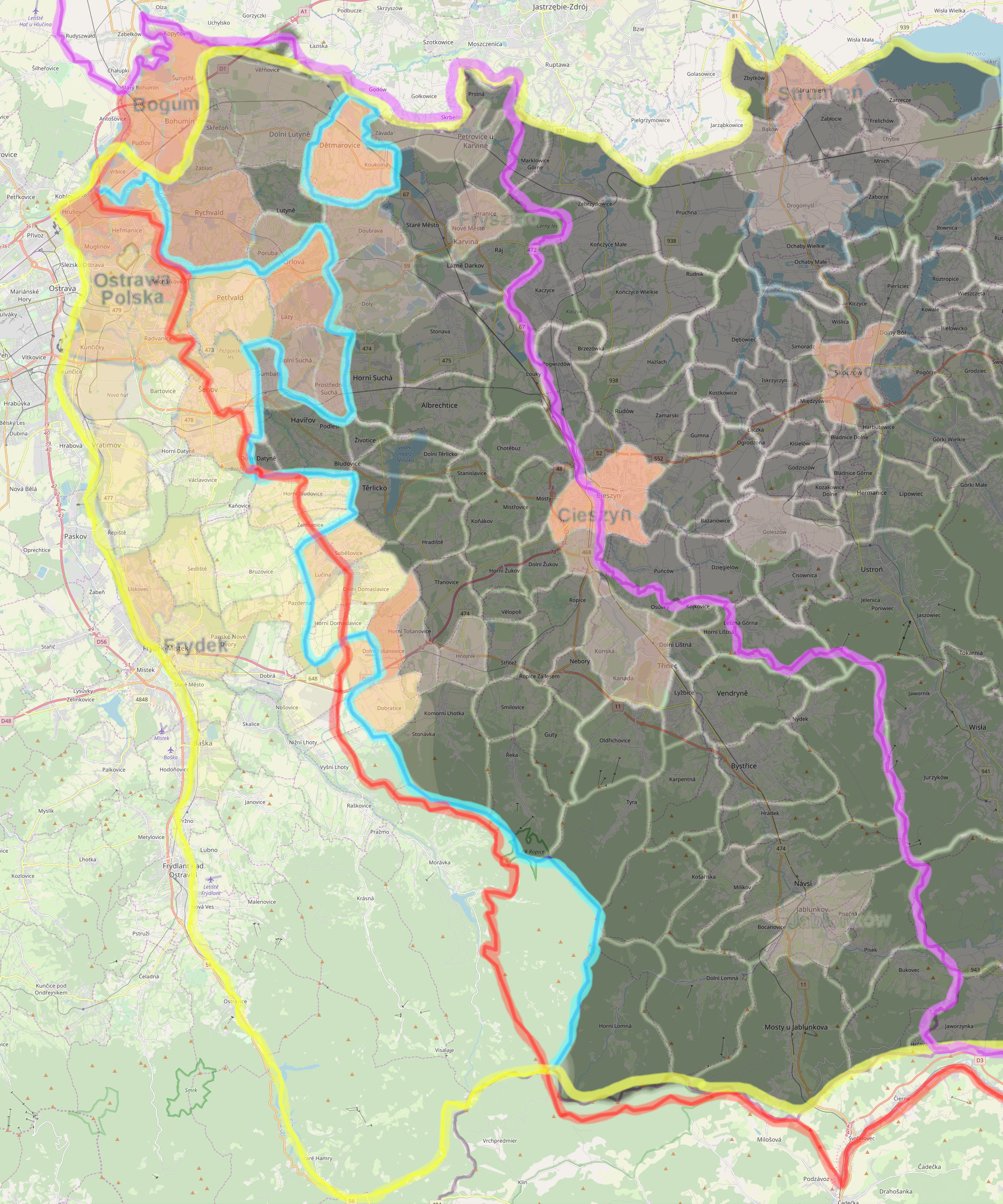
Historical borders in the west of Cieszyn Silesia atop results of the 1910 census: Duchy of Cieszyn in the early 16th century over 90% Polish-speaking in 1910 Border from 5 November 1918 Border from 10 December 1938 Border from 28 July 1920 to 31 October 1938 and from 9 May 1945

Cieszyn Silesia was claimed by both Poland and Czechoslovakia: the Polish Rada Narodowa Księstwa Cieszyńskiego made its claim in its declaration "Ludu śląski!" of 30 October 1918, and the Czech Zemský národní výbor pro Slezsko did so in its declaration of 1 November 1918. On 31 October 1918, at the end of World War I and the dissolution of Austria-Hungary, the majority of the area was taken over by local Polish authorities supported by armed forces. An interim agreement from 2 November 1918 reflected the inability of the two national councils to come to final delimitation and on 5 November 1918, the area was divided between Poland and Czechoslovakia by an agreement of the two councils. In early 1919 both councils were absorbed by the newly created and independent central governments in Prague and Warsaw.

Following an announcement that elections to the Sejm (parliament) of Poland would be held in the entirety of Cieszyn Silesia, the Czechoslovak government requested that the Poles cease their preparations as no elections were to be held in the disputed territory until a final agreement could be reached. When their demands were rejected by the Poles, the Czechs decided to resolve the issue by force and on 23 January 1919 invaded the area.

The Czechoslovak offensive was halted after pressure from the Entente following the Battle of Skoczów, and a ceasefire was signed on 3 February. The new Czechoslovakia claimed the area partly on historic and ethnic grounds, but especially on economic grounds. The area was important for the Czechs as the crucial railway line connecting Czech Silesia with Slovakia crossed the area (the Košice–Bohumín Railway, which was one of only two railroads that linked the Czech provinces to Slovakia at that time). The area is also very rich in black coal. Many important coal mines, facilities and metallurgy factories are located there. The Polish side based its claim to the area on ethnic criteria: a majority (69.2%) of the area's population was Polish according to the last (1910) Austrian census.

In this very tense atmosphere it was decided that a plebiscite would be held in the area asking people which country this territory should join. Plebiscite commissioners arrived there at the end of January 1920, and after analysing the situation declared a state of emergency in the territory on 19 May 1920. The situation in the area remained very tense, with mutual intimidation, acts of terror, beatings and even killings. A plebiscite could not be held in this atmosphere. On 10 July both sides renounced the idea of a plebiscite and entrusted the Conference of Ambassadors with the decision. Eventually, on 28 July 1920, by a decision of the Spa Conference, Czechoslovakia received 58.1% of the area of Cieszyn Silesia, containing 67.9% of the population. It was this territory that became known from the Polish standpoint as Zaolzie – the Olza River marked the boundary between the Polish and Czechoslovak parts of the territory.

The most vocal support for union with Poland had come from within the territory awarded to Czechoslovakia, while some of the strongest opponents of Polish rule came from the territory awarded to Poland.

==== View of Richard M. Watt ====
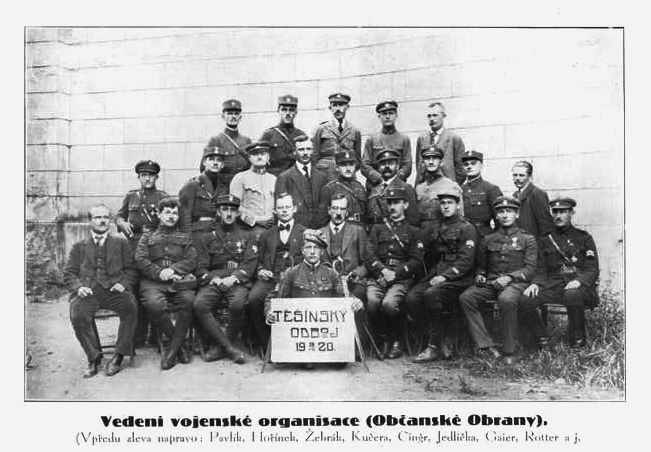
Leadership of the Civic Defence – Czech paramilitary organisation active in Cieszyn Silesia

Historian Richard M. Watt writes, "On 5 November 1918, the Poles and the Czechs in the region disarmed the Austrian garrison (...) The Poles took over the areas that appeared to be theirs, just as the Czechs had assumed administration of theirs. Nobody objected to this friendly arrangement (...) Then came second thoughts in Prague. It was observed that under the agreement of 5 November, the Poles controlled about a third of the duchy's coal mines. The Czechs realized that they had given away rather a lot (...) It was recognized that any takeover in Cieszyn would have to be accomplished in a manner acceptable by the victorious Allies (...), so the Czechs cooked up a tale that the Cieszyn area was becoming Bolshevik (...) The Czechs put together a substantial body of infantry – about 15,000 men – and on 23 January 1919, they invaded the Polish-held areas. To confuse the Poles, the Czechs recruited some Allied officers of Czech background and put these men in their respective wartime uniforms at the head of the invasion forces. After a little skirmishing, the tiny Polish defense force was nearly driven out."

In 1919, the matter went to consideration in Paris before the World War I Allies. Watt claims the Poles based their claims on ethnographical reasons and the Czechs based their need on the Cieszyn coal, useful in order to influence the actions of Austria and Hungary, whose capitals were fuelled by coal from the duchy. The Allies finally decided that the Czechs should get 60 percent of the coal fields and the Poles were to get most of the people and the strategic rail line. Watt writes: "Czech envoy Edvard Beneš proposed a plebiscite. The Allies were shocked, arguing that the Czechs were bound to lose it. However, Beneš was insistent and a plebiscite was announced in September 1919. As it turned out, Beneš knew what he was doing. A plebiscite would take some time to set up, and a lot could happen in that time – particularly when a nation's affairs were conducted as cleverly as were Czechoslovakia's."

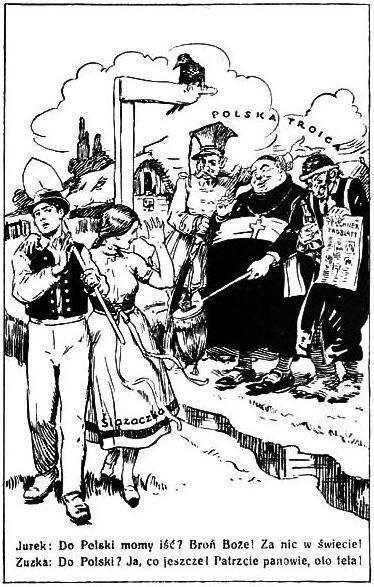
Czech anti-Polish leaflet aimed at Cieszyn Silesians

Watt argues that Beneš strategically waited for Poland's moment of weakness, and moved in during the Polish-Soviet War crisis in July 1920. As Watt writes, "Over the dinner table, Beneš convinced the British and French that the plebiscite should not be held and that the Allies should simply impose their own decision in the Cieszyn matter. More than that, Beneš persuaded the French and the British to draw a frontier line that gave Czechoslovakia most of the territory of Cieszyn, the vital railroad and all the important coal fields. With this frontier, 139,000 Poles were to be left in Czech territory, whereas only 2,000 Czechs were left on the Polish side".

"The next morning Beneš visited the Polish delegation at Spa. By giving the impression that the Czechs would accept a settlement favorable to the Poles without a plebiscite, Beneš got the Poles to sign an agreement that Poland would abide by any Allied decision regarding Cieszyn. The Poles, of course, had no way of knowing that Beneš had already persuaded the Allies to make a decision on Cieszyn. After a brief interval, to make it appear that due deliberation had taken place, the Allied Council of Ambassadors in Paris imposed its 'decision'. Only then did it dawn on the Poles that at Spa they had signed a blank check. To them, Beneš' stunning triumph was not diplomacy, it was a swindle (...) As Polish Prime Minister Wincenty Witos warned: 'The Polish nation has received a blow which will play an important role in our relations with the Czechoslovak Republic. The decision of the Council of Ambassadors has given the Czechs a piece of Polish land containing a population which is mostly Polish.... The decision has caused a rift between these two nations which are ordinarily politically and economically united' ( ...."

==== View of Victor S. Mamatey ====
Another account of the situation in 1918–1919 is given by Slovak-American historian Victor S. Mamatey. He notes that when the French government recognised Czechoslovakia's right to the "boundaries of Bohemia, Moravia, and Austrian Silesia" in its note to Austria of 19 December, the Czechoslovak government acted under the impression it had French support for its claim to Cieszyn Silesia as part of Austrian Silesia. However, Paris believed it gave that assurance only against German-Austrian claims, not Polish ones. Paris, however, viewed both Czechoslovakia and Poland as potential allies against Germany and did not want to cool relations with either. Mamatey writes that the Poles "brought the matter before the peace conference that had opened in Paris on 18 January. On 29 January, the Council of Ten summoned Beneš and the Polish delegate Roman Dmowski to explain the dispute, and on 1 February obliged them to sign an agreement redividing the area pending its final disposition by the peace conference. Czechoslovakia thus failed to gain her objective in Cieszyn."

With respect to the arbitration decision itself, Mamatey writes that "On 25 March, to expedite the work of the peace conference, the Council of Ten was divided into the Council of Four (The "Big Four") and the Council of Five (the foreign ministers). Early in April the two councils considered and approved the recommendations of the Czechoslovak commission without a change – with the exception of Cieszyn, which they referred to Poland and Czechoslovakia to settle in bilateral negotiations." When the Polish-Czechoslovak negotiations failed, the Allied powers proposed plebiscites in the Cieszyn Silesia and also in the border districts of Orava and Spiš (now in Slovakia) to which the Poles had raised claims. In the end, however, no plebiscites were held due to the rising mutual hostilities of Czechs and Poles in Cieszyn Silesia. Instead, on 28 July 1920 the Spa Conference (also known as the Conference of Ambassadors) divided each of the three disputed areas between Poland and Czechoslovakia.

=== Part of Czechoslovakia (1920–1938) ===
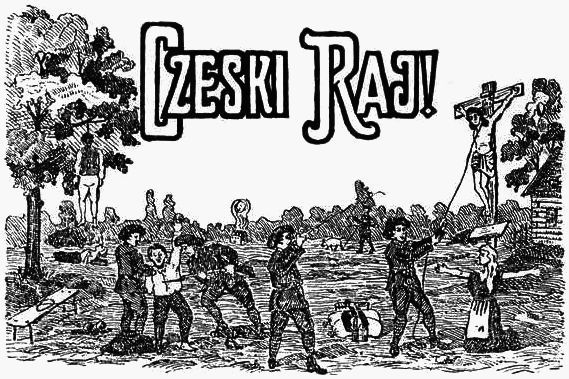
Polish anti-Czech agitation leaflet

The local Polish population felt that Warsaw had betrayed them and they were not satisfied with the division of Cieszyn Silesia. About 12,000 to 14,000 Poles were forced to leave to Poland. It is not quite clear how many Poles were in Trans-Olza in Czechoslovakia. Estimates (depending mainly whether the Silesians are included as Poles or not) range from 110,000 to 140,000 people in 1921. The 1921 and 1930 census numbers are not accurate since nationality depended on self-declaration and many Poles filled in Czech nationality mainly as a result of fear of the new authorities and as compensation for some benefits. Czechoslovak law guaranteed rights for national minorities but reality in Trans-Olza was quite different. Local Czech authorities made it more difficult for local Poles to obtain citizenship, while the process was expedited when the applicant pledged to declare Czech nationality and send his children to a Czech school. Newly built Czech schools were often better supported and equipped, thus inducing some Poles to send their children there. Czech schools were built in ethnically almost entirely Polish municipalities. This and other factors contributed to the cultural assimilation of Poles and also to significant emigration to Poland. After a few years, the heightened nationalism typical for the years around 1920 receded and local Poles increasingly co-operated with Czechs. Still, Czechization was supported by Prague, which did not follow certain laws related to language, legislative and organizational issues. Polish deputies in the Czechoslovak National Assembly frequently tried to put those issues on agenda. One way or another, more and more local Poles thus assimilated into the Czech population.

=== Part of Poland (1938–1939) ===
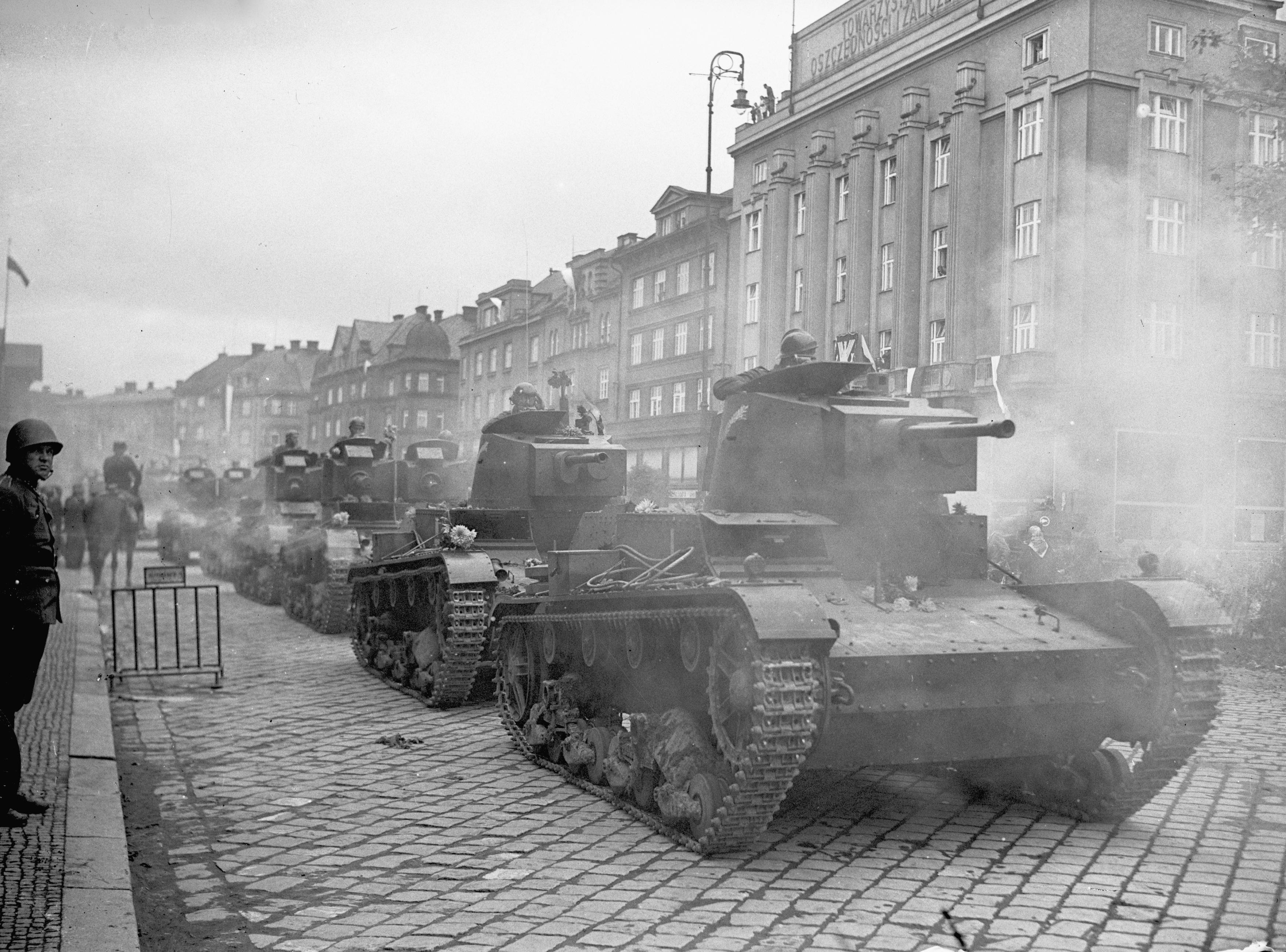
Polish Army entering Český Těšín in 1938

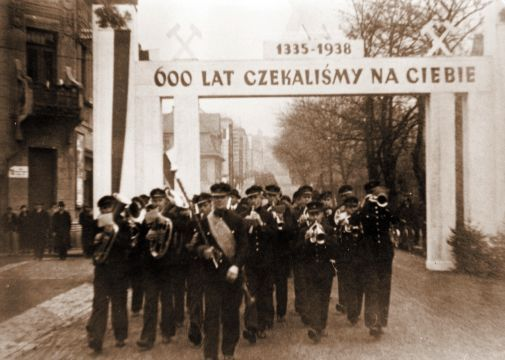
"For 600 years we have been waiting for you (1335–1938)." Ethnic Polish band welcoming the annexation of Trans-Olza by the Polish Republic in Karviná, October 1938

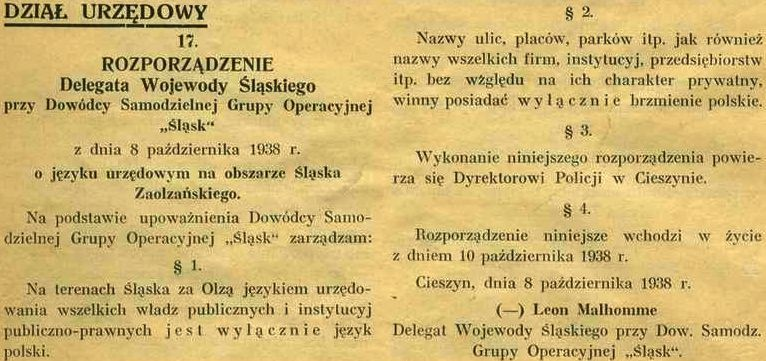
Decree on the official language on the annexed territory

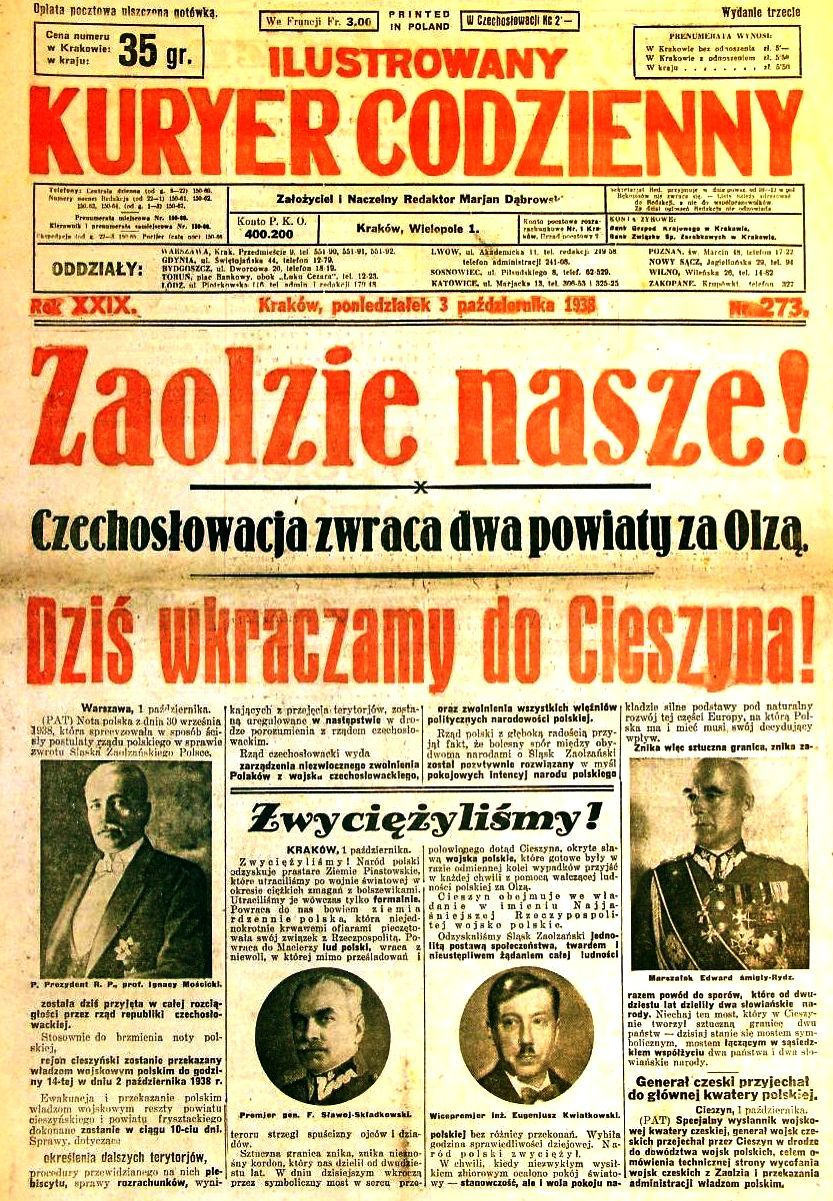
"Zaolzie is ours!" – Polish newspaper Ilustrowany Kuryer Codzienny on 3 October 1938

Within the region originally demanded from Czechoslovakia by Nazi Germany in 1938 was the important railway junction city of Bohumín (Polish: Bogumin). The Poles regarded the city as of crucial importance to the area and to Polish interests. On 28 September, Edvard Beneš composed a note to the Polish administration offering to reopen the debate surrounding the territorial demarcation in Těšínsko in the interest of mutual relations, but he delayed in sending it in hopes of good news from London and Paris, which came only in a limited form. Beneš then turned to the Soviet leadership in Moscow, which had begun a partial mobilisation in eastern Belarus and the Ukrainian SSR on 22 September and threatened Poland with the dissolution of the Soviet-Polish non-aggression pact. The Czech government was offered 700 fighter planes if room for them could be found on the Czech airfields. On 28 September, all the military districts west of the Urals were ordered to stop releasing men for leave. On 29 September 330,000 reservists were up throughout the western USSR.

Nevertheless, the Polish Foreign Minister, Colonel Józef Beck, believed that Warsaw should act rapidly to forestall the German occupation of the city. At noon on 30 September, Poland gave an ultimatum to the Czechoslovak government. It demanded the immediate evacuation of Czechoslovak troops and police and gave Prague time until noon the following day. At 11:45 a.m. on 1 October the Czechoslovak foreign ministry called the Polish ambassador in Prague and told him that Poland could have what it wanted. The Polish Army, commanded by General Władysław Bortnowski, annexed an area of 801.5 km^{2} with a population of 227,399 people. Administratively the annexed area was divided between two counties: Frysztat and Cieszyn County. At the same time Slovakia lost to Hungary 10,390 km^{2} with 854,277 inhabitants.

The Germans were delighted with this outcome, and were happy to give up the sacrifice of a small provincial rail centre to Poland in exchange for the ensuing propaganda benefits. It spread the blame of the partition of the Republic of Czechoslovakia, made Poland a participant in the process and confused political expectations. Poland was accused of being an accomplice of Nazi Germany – a charge that Warsaw was hard-put to deny.

The Polish side argued that Poles in Trans-Olza deserved the same ethnic rights and freedom as the Sudeten Germans under the Munich Agreement. The vast local Polish population enthusiastically welcomed the change, seeing it as a liberation and a form of historical justice, but they quickly changed their mood. The new Polish authorities appointed people from Poland to various key positions from which locals were fired. The Polish language became the sole official language. Using Czech (or German) by Czechs (or Germans) in public was prohibited and Czechs and Germans were being forced to leave the annexed area or become subject to Polonization. Rapid Polonization policies then followed in all parts of public and private life. Czech organizations were dismantled and their activity was prohibited. The Roman Catholic parishes in the area belonged either to the Archdiocese of Breslau (Archbishop Bertram) or to the Archdiocese of Olomouc (Archbishop Leopold Prečan), respectively, both traditionally comprising cross-border diocesan territories in Czechoslovakia and Germany. When the Polish government demanded after its takeover that the parishes there be disentangled from these two archdioceses, the Holy See complied. Pope Pius XI, former nuncio to Poland, subjected the Catholic parishes in Trans-Olza to an apostolic administration under Stanisław Adamski, Bishop of Katowice.

Czechoslovak education in the Czech and German language ceased to exist. About 35,000 Czechoslovaks emigrated to core Czechoslovakia (the later Protectorate of Bohemia and Moravia) by choice or forcibly. The behaviour of the new Polish authorities was different but similar in nature to that of the Czechoslovak ones before 1938. Two political factions appeared: socialists (the opposition) and rightists (loyal to the new Polish national authorities). Leftist politicians and sympathizers were discriminated against and often fired from work. The Polish political system was artificially implemented in Trans-Olza. The local Poles continued to feel like second-class citizens and a majority of them were dissatisfied with the situation after October 1938. Zaolzie remained a part of Poland for only 11 months until the invasion of Poland started on 1 September 1939.

==== Reception ====
When Poland entered the Western camp in April 1939, General Gamelin reminded General Kasprzycki of the Polish role in the dismemberment of Czechoslovakia. According to historian Paul N. Hehn, Poland's annexation of Zaolzie may have contributed to the British and French reluctance to attack the Germans with greater forces in September 1939.

Richard M. Watt describes the Polish capture of Zaolzie in these words:

Amid the general euphoria in Poland – the acquisition of Zaolzie was a very popular development – no one paid attention to the bitter comment of the Czechoslovak general who handed the region over to the incoming Poles. He predicted that it would not be long before the Poles would themselves be handing Zaolzie over to the Germans.

Watt also writes that

the Polish 1938 ultimatum to Czechoslovakia and its acquisition of Zaolzie were gross tactical errors. Whatever justice there might have been to the Polish claim upon Zaolzie, its seizure in 1938 was an enormous mistake in terms of the damage done to Poland's reputation among the democratic powers of the world.

Daladier, the French Prime Minister, told the US ambassador to France that "he hoped to live long enough to pay Poland for her cormorant attitude in the present crisis by proposing a new partition." The Soviet Union was so hostile to Poland over Munich that there was a real prospect that war between the two states might break out quite separate from the wider conflict over Czechoslovakia. The Soviet Prime Minister, Molotov, denounced the Poles as "Hitler's jackals".

In his postwar memoirs, Winston Churchill compared Germany and Poland to vultures landing on the dying carcass of Czechoslovakia and lamented that "over a question so minor as Cieszyn, they [the Poles] sundered themselves from all those friends in France, Britain and the United States who had lifted them once again to a national, coherent life, and whom they were soon to need so sorely. ... It is a mystery and tragedy of European history that a people capable of every heroic virtue ... as individuals, should repeatedly show such inveterate faults in almost every aspect of their governmental life." Churchill also associated such behaviour with hyenas.

In 2009 Polish president Lech Kaczyński declared during 70th anniversary of start of World War II, which was welcomed by the Czech and Slovak diplomatic delegations:

Poland's participation in the annexation of Czechoslovakia in 1938 was not only an error, but above all a sin. And we in Poland can admit this error rather than look for excuses. We need to draw conclusions from Munich and they apply to modern times: you can't give way to imperialism.

— Lech Kaczyński, Polish Radio

The Polish annexation of Zaolzie is frequently brought up by Russian media as a counter-argument to Soviet-Nazi cooperation.

=== World War II ===
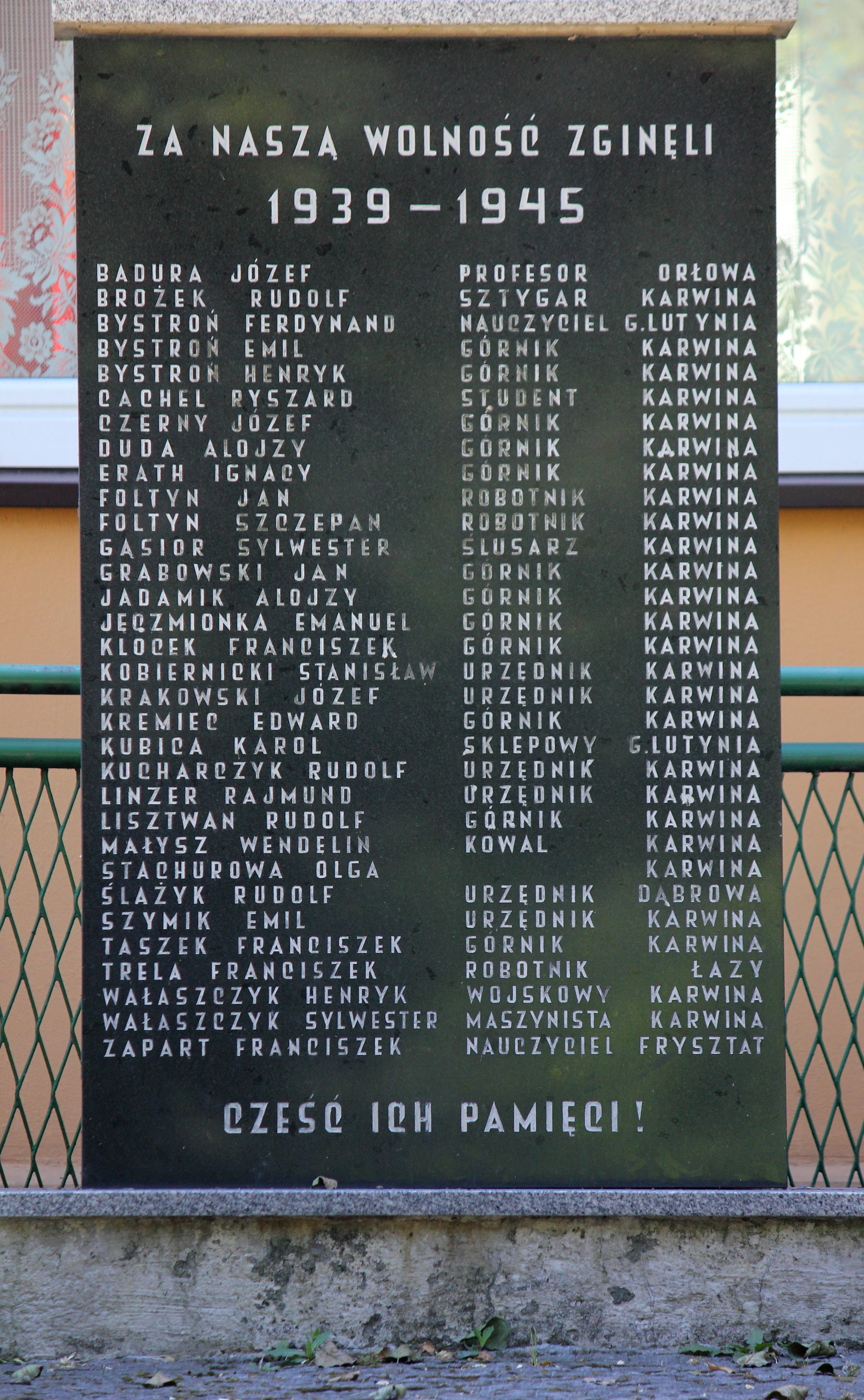
World War II memorial in Karviná

On 1 September 1939 Nazi Germany invaded Poland, starting World War II in Europe, and subsequently made Trans-Olza part of the Military district of Upper Silesia. On 26 October 1939 Nazi Germany unilaterally annexed Trans-Olza as part of Landkreis Teschen. During the war, strong Germanization was introduced by the authorities. The Jews were in the worst position, followed by the Poles. Poles received lower food rations, they were supposed to pay extra taxes, they were not allowed to enter theatres, cinemas, etc. Polish and Czech education ceased to exist, Polish organizations were dismantled and their activity was prohibited. Katowice's Bishop Adamski was deposed as apostolic administrator for the Catholic parishes in Trans-Olza and on 23 December 1939 Cesare Orsenigo, nuncio to Germany, returned them to their original archdioceses of Breslau or Olomouc, respectively, with effect of 1 January 1940.

The German authorities introduced terror into Trans-Olza. The Nazis especially targeted the Polish intelligentsia, many of whom died during the war. Mass killings, executions, arrests, taking locals to forced labour and deportations to concentration camps all happened on a daily basis. The most notorious war crime was a murder of 36 villagers in and around Żywocice on 6 August 1944. This massacre is known as the Żywocice tragedy (Polish: Tragedia Żywocicka). The resistance movement, mostly composed of Poles, was fairly strong in Trans-Olza. So-called Volksliste – a document in which a non-German citizen declared that he had some German ancestry by signing it; refusal to sign this document could lead to deportation to a concentration camp – were introduced. Local people who took them were later on enrolled in the Wehrmacht. Many local people with no German ancestry were also forced to take them. The World War II death toll in Trans-Olza is estimated at about 6,000 people: about 2,500 Jews, 2,000 other citizens (80% of them being Poles) and more than 1,000 locals who died in the Wehrmacht (those who took the Volksliste). Also a few hundred Poles from Trans-Olza were murdered by Soviets in the Katyn massacre. Percentage-wise, Trans-Olza suffered the worst human loss from the whole of Czechoslovakia – about 2.6% of the total population.

=== Since 1945 ===
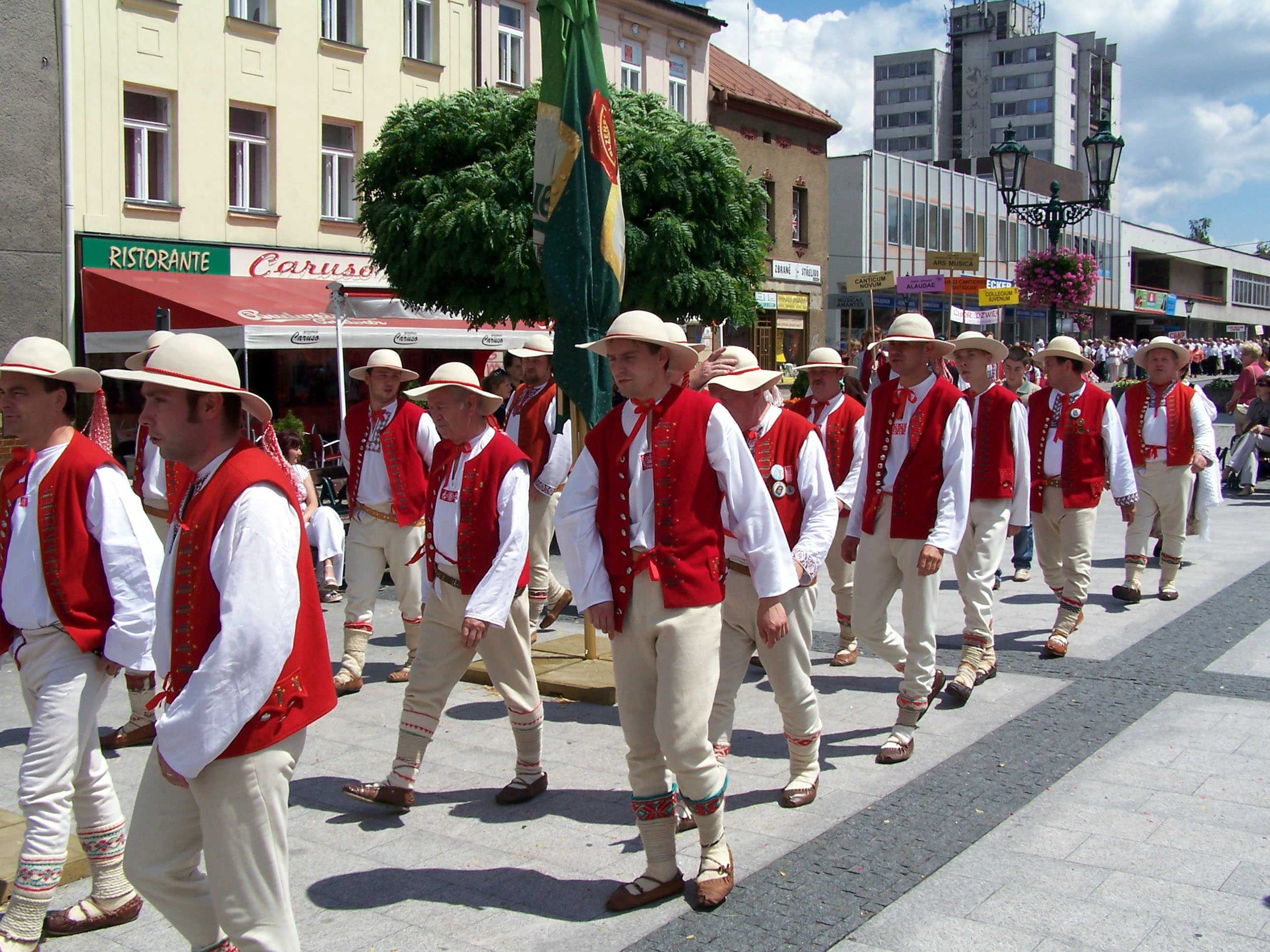
Polish Gorals from Jablunkov during PZKO festival in Karviná, 2007

Immediately after World War II, Trans-Olza was returned to Czechoslovakia within its 1920 borders, although local Poles had hoped it would again be given to Poland. Most Czechoslovaks of German ethnicity were expelled, and the local Polish population again suffered discrimination, as many Czechs blamed them for the discrimination by the Polish authorities in 1938–1939. Polish organizations were banned, and the Czechoslovak authorities carried out many arrests and dismissed many Poles from work. The situation had somewhat improved when the Communist Party of Czechoslovakia took power in February 1948. Polish property deprived by the German occupants during the war was never returned.

As to the Catholic parishes in Trans-Olza pertaining to the Archdiocese of Breslau Archbishop Bertram, then residing in the episcopal Jánský Vrch Castle in Czechoslovak Javorník, appointed František Onderek (1888–1962) as vicar general for the Czechoslovak portion of the Archdiocese of Breslau on 21 June 1945. In July 1946 Pope Pius XII elevated Onderek to Apostolic Administrator for the Czechoslovak portion of the Archdiocese of Breslau (colloquially: Apostolic Administration of Český Těšín; Czech: Apoštolská administratura českotěšínská), seated in Český Těšín, thus disentangling the parishes from Breslau's jurisdiction. On 31 May 1978 Pope Paul VI merged the apostolic administration into the Archdiocese of Olomouc through his Apostolic constitution Olomoucensis et aliarum.

Poland signed a treaty with Czechoslovakia in Warsaw on 13 June 1958 confirming the border as it existed on 1 January 1938. After the Communist takeover of power, the industrial boom continued and many immigrants arrived in the area (mostly from other parts of Czechoslovakia, mainly from Slovakia). The arrival of Slovaks significantly changed the ethnic structure of the area, as almost all the Slovak immigrants assimilated into the Czech majority in the course of time. The number of self-declared Slovaks is rapidly declining. The last Slovak primary school was closed in Karviná several years ago. Since the dissolution of Czechoslovakia in 1993, Trans-Olza has been part of the independent Czech Republic. However, a significant Polish minority still remains there.

=== In the European Union ===
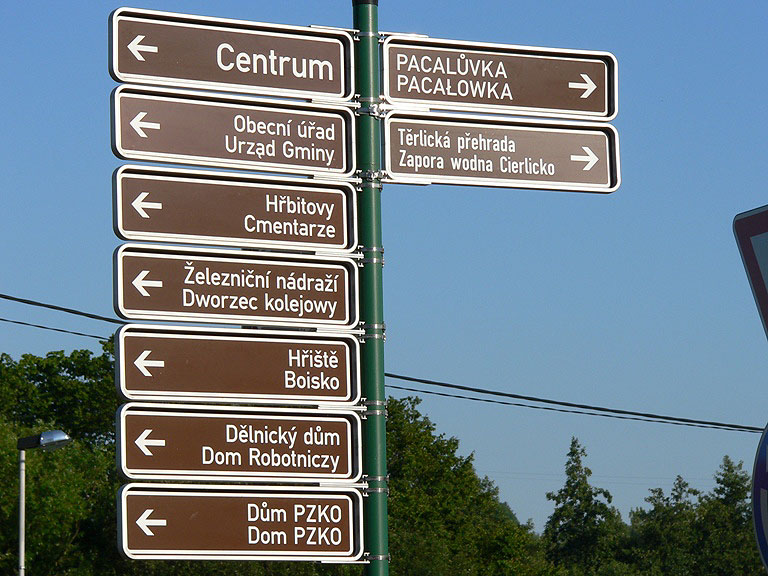
Czech and Polish bilingual signs in Trans-Olza

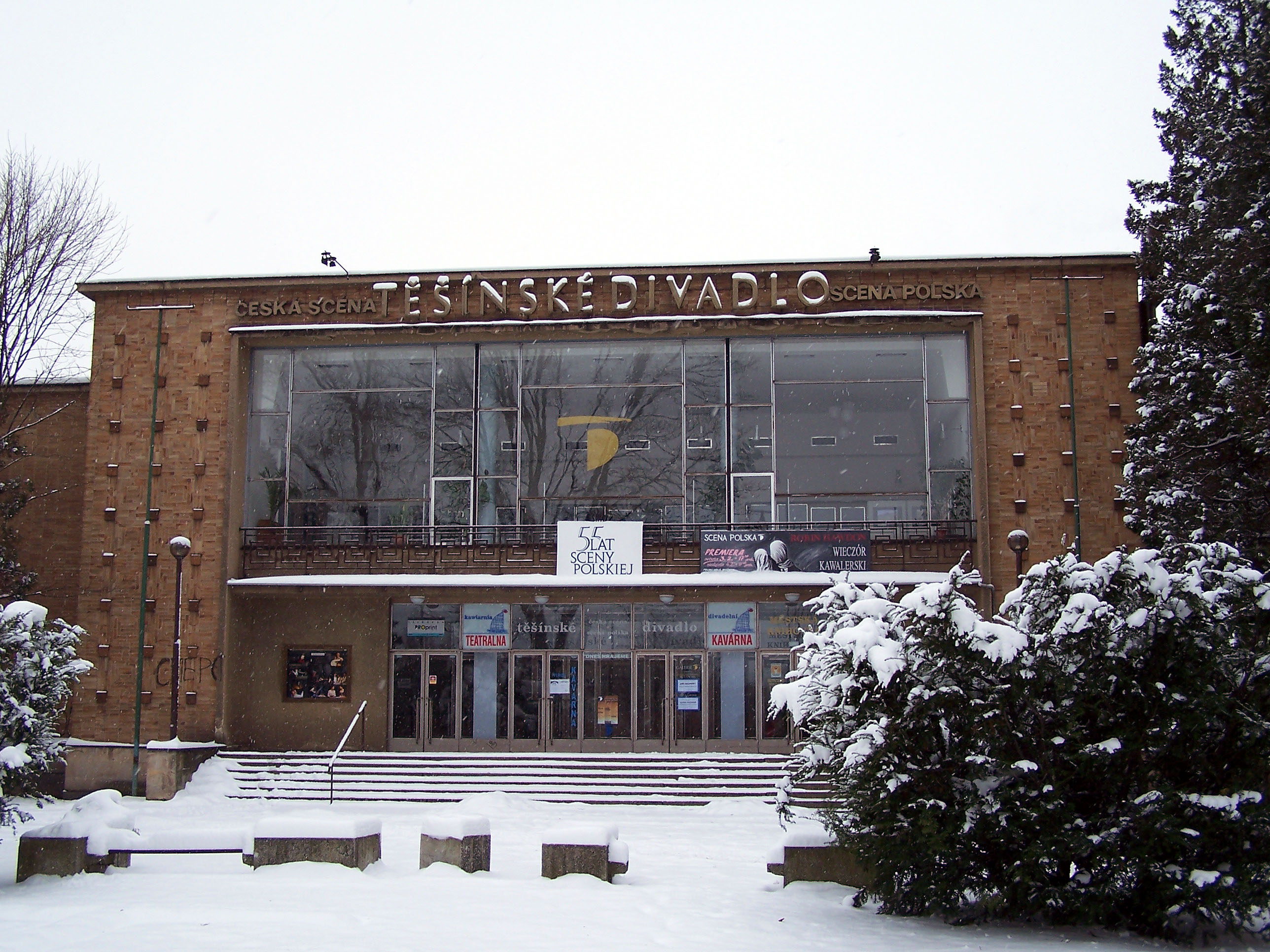
Těšín Theatre has a professional Polish ensemble

The entry of both the Czech Republic and Poland to the European Union in May 2004, and especially the entry of the countries to the EU's passport-free Schengen zone in late 2007, reduced the significance of territorial disputes, ending systematic controls on the border between the countries. Signs prohibiting passage across the state border were removed, with people now allowed to cross the border freely at any point of their choosing.

The area now belongs mostly to the Cieszyn Silesia Euroregion with a few municipalities in the Euroregion Beskydy.

== Census data ==
Ethnic structure of Trans-Olza based on census results:

Year	Total	Poles	Czechs	Germans	Slovaks
1880	94,370	71,239	16,425	6,672	–
1890	107,675	86,674	13,580	7,388	–
1900	143,220	115,392	14,093	13,476	–
1910	179,145	123,923	32,821	22,312	–
1921	177,176	68,034	88,556	18,260	–
1930	216,255	76,230	120,639	17,182	–
1939	213,867	51,499	44,579	38,408	–
1950	219,811	59,005	155,146	–	4,388
1961	281,183	58,876	205,785	–	13,233
1970	350,825	56,075	263,047	–	26,806
1980	366,559	51,586	281,584	–	28,719
1991	368,355	43,479	263,941	706	26,629

Sources: Zahradnik 1992, 178–179. Siwek 1996, 31–38.

== See also ==
- History of Cieszyn and Těšín
- Polonia Karwina
- Independent Operational Group Silesia
