= Józef Ondrusz =

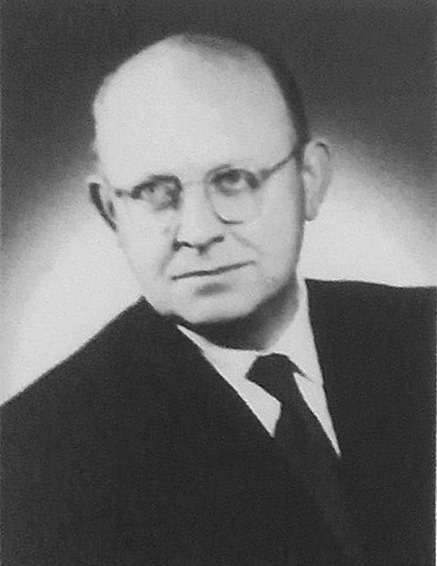
- Józef Ondrusz
- Born: 18 March 1918; Darków, Austrian Silesia
- Died: 27 May 1996 (aged 78); Karviná-Lázně Darkov, Czech Republic
- Resting place: Stonava
- Citizenship: Czechoslovak, Czech
- Occupations: Folklorist and writer
- Writing career
- Language: Polish, Cieszyn Silesian dialect
- Notable work: Godki śląskie

Józef Ondrusz (18 March 1918 – 27 May 1996) was a Polish Czech teacher, writer and folklorist.

== Biography ==
Ondrusz was born in the village of Darków (now Lázně Darkov part of Karviná) to a coal miner. He graduated from a Polish grammar school in Fryštát and later from teachers' seminary in Ostrava. After World War II Ondrusz taught at the Polish school in Lázně Darkov and wrote several schoolbooks for Polish schools in the Trans-Olza region. He also co-founded magazines for children, Jutrzenka and Ogniwo. He was an active member of PZKO (Polish Cultural and Educational Union) and also became active in the Polish scouting in Czechoslovakia. He earned a doctorate in 1972 for his thesis Proza ludowa Śląska Cieszyńskiego 1845-1970 (Folk Prose of Cieszyn Silesia 1845-1970).

Ondrusz was fascinated by the culture and traditions of Cieszyn Silesia and was a keen collector of everything related to regional culture. He eventually published traditional folk fables, proverbs and stories, often literally adapting them.

He wrote his works in literary Polish and in the local dialect. His works focus mostly on regional folklore, culture and fables.

Ondrusz also contributed to the popularization of bookplates in Cieszyn Silesia in the 1960s. Many notable Polish and Czech artists made bookplates for him.

Józef Ondrusz died in Lázně Darkov and is buried at the Lutheran cemetery in the nearby municipality of Stonava.

== Works ==
- Przysłowia i powiedzenia ludowe ze Śląska Cieszyńskiego (1954)
- Godki śląskie (1956, 1973, 1974, 1977)
- Przysłowia i przymówiska ludowe ze Śląska Cieszyńskiego (1960)
- Śląskie opowieści ludowe (1963)
- Proza górników karwińskich (1974)
- Wspominki okupacyjne (1981)
- Cudowny chleb (1984, 1986)
- O ptaszku Złotodzióbku i inne bajki (1986)
