= Staré Město (Karviná) =

Municipal part of Karviná

Coordinates: 49°51′19″N 18°31′17″E

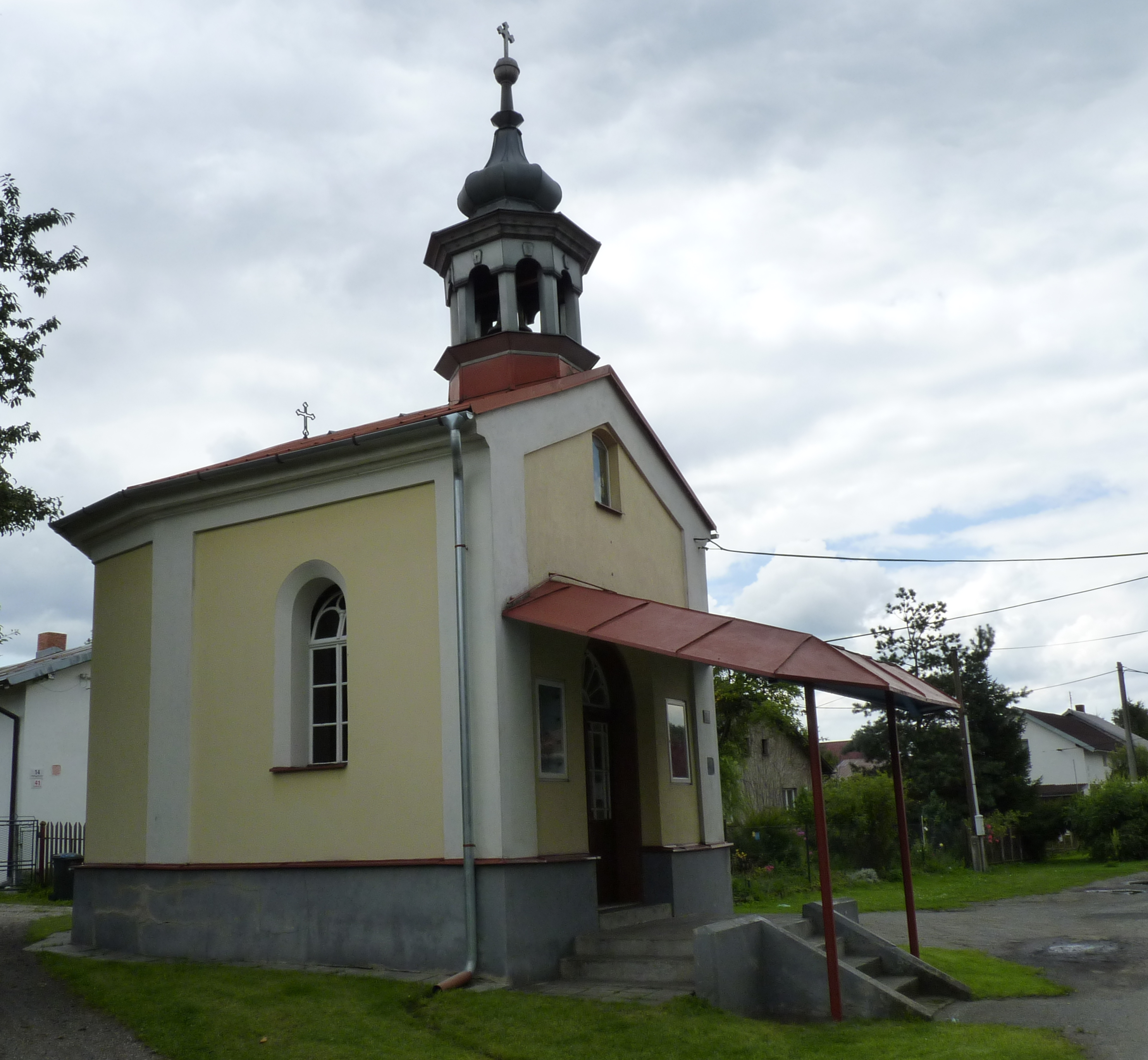
A local chapel

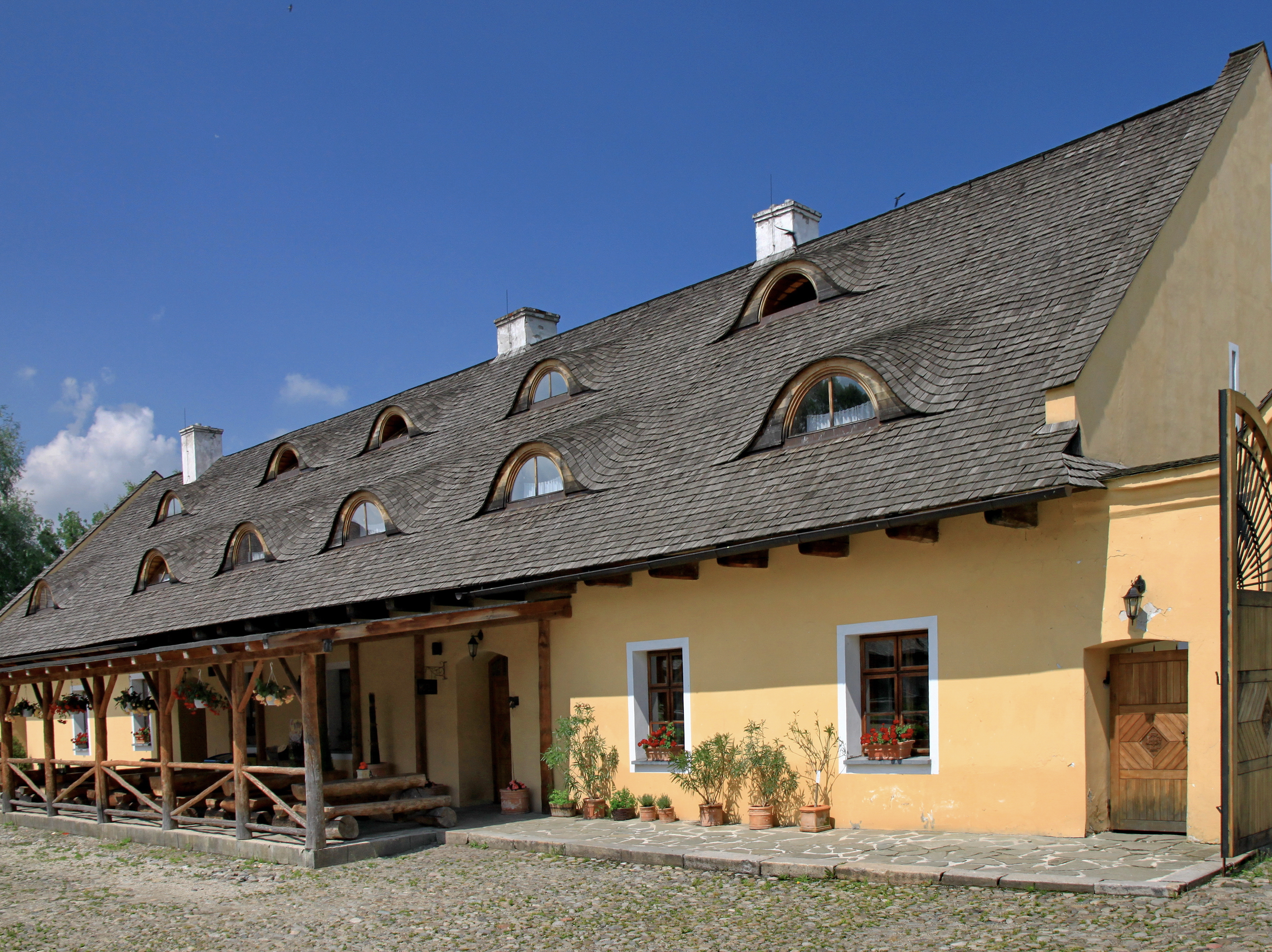
Manor house

Staré Město (Polish: Stare Miasto, German: Altstadt, lit. "old town") is a district of the city of Karviná in Karviná District, Moravian-Silesian Region, Czech Republic. It lies on the right bank of the Olza river, in the historical region of Cieszyn Silesia and has a population of 855 (2001).

== History ==
It could have been first mentioned in a Latin document of Diocese of Wrocław called Liber fundationis episcopatus Vratislaviensis from around 1305 as item in Cula sunt XL mansi, de quibus monachi de Orlavia XVI) mansos ab antiquo habent, reliqui vero spectant ad mensam episcopalem. It meant that the village had 40 smaller lans, and that it was from long time obliged to pay a tithe from 16 of the lans to the Benedictine abbey in Orlová, and from the rest to bishops. So it was obvious that the village was much older, probably it could have been established in the 12th century, or even in the tribal era, when the Golensizi tribe dwelled in the area. It could have been also (re)settled by Benedictine abbey after it was founded in Orlová in 1268. It was later mentioned as Czulaw in 1439. It became a seat of a Catholic parish, which was mentioned in the register of Peter's Pence payment from 1447 among 50 parishes of Teschen deaconry as Czula. Afterwards this name disappears in sources, and the large and developed village is often regarded to be lost in the following centuries. Its connection to Staré Město is uncertain and disputed, however it had to lay somewhere not far from it.

Concurrently to the Cula/Kula/Czula village Staré Město was first mentioned in 1406 as Antiqua Civitate prope Freyenstad civitatem, later in 1434 as Altstadt, in 1447 as Stari Frystath and in 1450 as Stare miesto. The name, Old Town, indicates that it could have been originally intended to be the ground for the location of the town of Frienstad (Fryštát), but as it soon proved to be prone to flooding the town was located on the grounds of Ráj (Ray) village instead.

Politically the area belonged initially to the Duchy of Opole and Racibórz and Castellany of Cieszyn, which was in 1290 formed in the process of feudal fragmentation of Poland and was ruled by a local branch of Piast dynasty. In 1327 the duchy became a fee of Kingdom of Bohemia, which after 1526 became part of the Habsburg monarchy.

Ondra Foltýn, who sparked a peasant revolt in 1766 which led to a partial abolishment of socage in the region, was born here.

After the Revolutions of 1848 in the Austrian Empire, a modern municipal division was introduced in the re-established Austrian Silesia. The village as a municipality was subscribed at least since 1880 to political district and legal district of Freistadt.

According to the censuses conducted in 1880, 1890, 1900 and 1910 the population of the municipality grew from 1,150 in 1880 to 2,864 in 1910. In terms of the language spoken colloquially the majority were Polish-speakers (between 91.5% and 93.8%), accompanied by German-speakers (at most 138 or 6.1% in 1890) and Czech-speakers (between 1.9% and 3.1%). In terms of religion, in 1910 the majority were Roman Catholics (95.1%), followed by Protestants (112 or 3.9%) and Jews (25 or 1%).

After World War I, the fall of Austria-Hungary, the Polish–Czechoslovak War and the division of Cieszyn Silesia in 1920, the village became a part of Czechoslovakia. Following the Munich Agreement, in October 1938 together with the Zaolzie region it was annexed by Poland, administratively organised in Frysztat County of Silesian Voivodeship. The village was then annexed by Nazi Germany at the beginning of World War II. After the war it was restored to Czechoslovakia. In 1948 it was merged with Fryštát and a few other settlements to form a contemporary town of Karviná.
