= Wacław Olszak =

Polish physician and politician

Mayor of Karviná
- In office 1929–1936

Personal details
- Born: 29 May 1868 Šenov, Austrian Silesia
- Died: 11 September 1939 (aged 71) Karviná, Nazi Germany
- Resting place: Karviná
- Spouse: Maria Olszakowa (née Krus)
- Children: Wacław, engineer Feliks, engineer Antoni; Maria
- Education: University of Vienna
- Occupation: Physician

Wacław Olszak (29 May 1868 – 11 September 1939) was a Polish physician, activist and politician. He came from the region of Trans-Olza in Czechoslovakia and was a mayor of the town of Karviná for seven years. Ten days after outbreak of World War II he was murdered by Nazis.

== Biography ==
Olszak was born in Šenov as a tenth child of a peasant. After primary school he attended the German gymnasium (high school) in Cieszyn, from which he graduated in 1889. He went to Vienna to study medicine at the University of Vienna. He graduated in 1895. After returning to his region, Olszak started to work as a doctor in Karviná, becoming the first Polish doctor for coal miners in that town. He also worked as a doctor at the château in Fryštát for count Larisch-Mönnich, and as a family doctor for many local German engineers and administration workers. Olszak however, working mostly with poor coal miners and their families, helped to organize a social help for them.

Olszak was a member and co-founder of various Polish organizations in Trans-Olza. He was a member of the general committee of Związek Polaków w Czechosłowacji (Association of Poles in Czechoslovakia) and Związek Śląskich Katolików w Czechosłowacji (Association of Silesian Catholics in Czechoslovakia). After World War I, as a member of the Association of Silesian Catholics, he took active part in the work of the National Council of the Duchy of Cieszyn, provisional Polish political body working for joining Cieszyn Silesia to independent Poland.

Olszak was regularly elected to the city council of Karviná and in 1929 became a mayor, beating in the elections Czech candidate Oskar Kučera. On 6 July 1930 he hosted in the town the Czechoslovak president Tomáš Garrigue Masaryk and welcomed him in Polish. President Masaryk later made a speech in both Polish and Czech languages. On 4 July 1936 Olszak contested in next mayoral elections but lost to Czech candidate Antonín Krůta. After the elections Olszak worked again as a general doctor for coal miners, he maintained this position after Poland annexed Trans-Olza in October 1938.

On 1 September 1939 World War II started and Wehrmacht entered also Trans-Olza region. Dr Olszak was arrested by Nazi authorities on 2 September. On 7 September he was called out to one of local coal mines to a reputed accident. Upon arrival he was seriously beaten by Gestapo and local German coal mining administration. He was transferred to the hospital, where he died on 11 September. Bleeding to the brain was given as a cause of death in the official documents. His funeral was highly restricted by Nazi German authorities who were aware of Olszak's popularity. Although crowds of locals followed the funeral procession, only four people were allowed to enter the cemetery - wife, two sons and priest. He is buried at a cemetery in the Doly district of Karviná.

Streets in Cieszyn and Karviná are named after him. His son Wacław became an internationally acclaimed engineer and construction theorist; his son Feliks became a metallurgical engineer.
