= Polonia Karwina =

- Full name: Polski Klub Sportowy Polonia Karwina
- Nickname: Duma Zaolzia (Trans-Olza Pride)
- Founded: 1919
- Dissolved: 1952
- Ground: Stadium Polonia in Karviná (defunct)
- Capacity: 3,000
Home colours

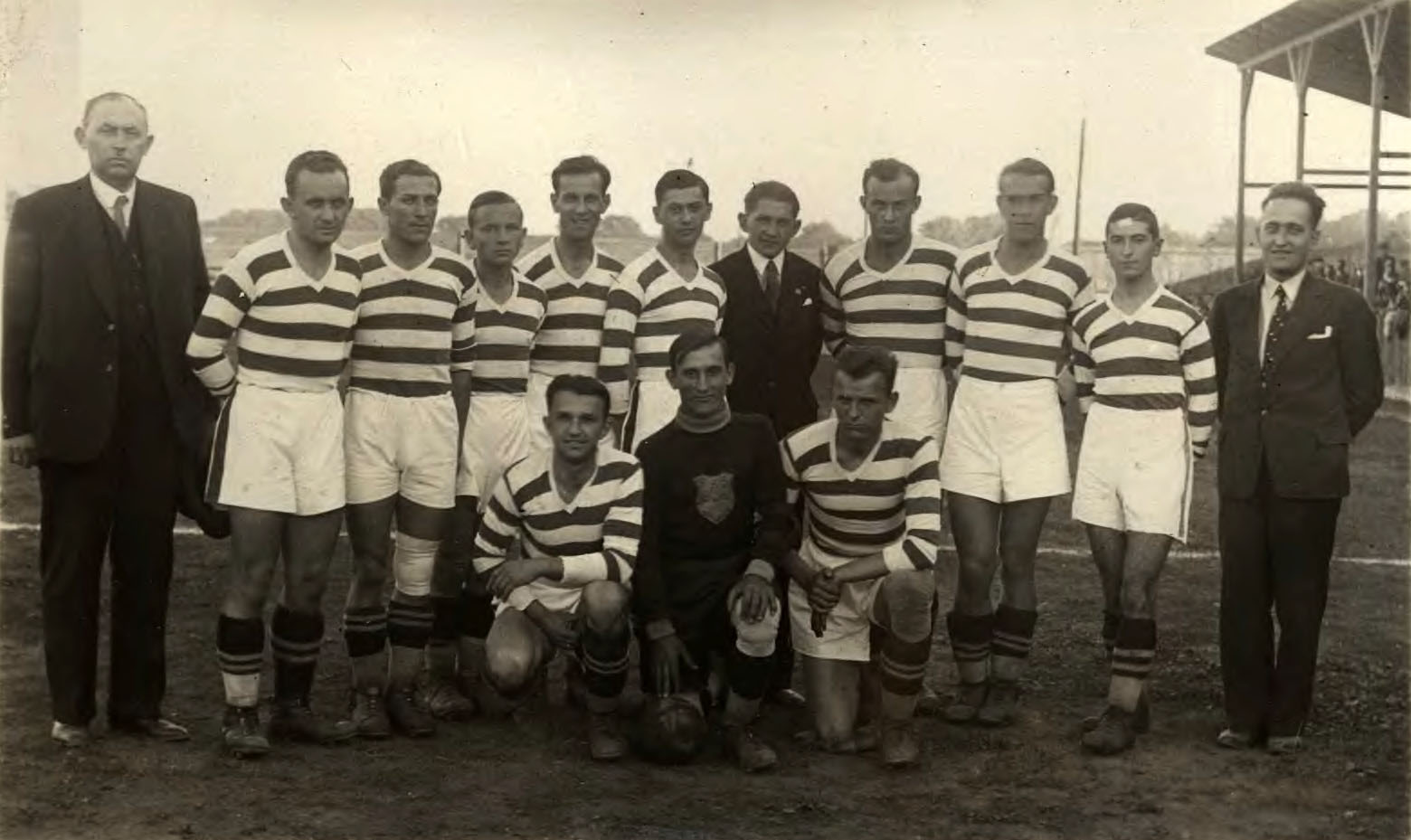
Polonia Karwina before 1934

Polski Klub Sportowy Polonia Karwina (PKS Polonia Karwina) was a Polish multi-sport club, located in the city of Karviná (Karwina) in Czechoslovakia. It affiliated nine sport clubs and an amateur theatre group. Most successful and most popular was a football club.

== History ==
Founded in 1919, as Polski Klub Sportowy Polonia, it was the strongest team of the Polish minority in Czechoslovakia. PKS Polonia was initially one of the sections of Polish Gymnastic Society Sokół, eventually on 28 January 1931 it gained organizational independence. In 1932 it had 302 members, 65 of them in football section. In the 1920s and 1930s it played in the regional, Těšín league (żupa) of the Czechoslovak Football Association. Together with such teams from Trans-Olza as Siła Trzyniec, Siła Karwina, Siła Orłowa, Siła Frysztat, Siła Karwina-Sowiniec, Polonia in 1922 was co-founder of the Polski Związek Klubów Sportowych w Czechosłowacji (Polish Association of Sport Clubs in Czechoslovakia), which in mid-1930s had some 4,000 members.

Also, Polonia was very active on international stage, playing numerous friendly games with several teams from Poland. In 1934 it won the football competition of the first Polonia Games in Warsaw. It was a tournament for Polish ethnic sports organizations existing beyond borders of Poland, its official name was: "Games for Sportsmen from Abroad and The Independent City of Danzig". After the return of the team to Karwina, 10,000 Poles welcomed the winning team.

In 1936 came the largest success of the team in Czechoslovakia. PKS Polonia won the Těšín league (župa) and advanced to the Moravian-Silesian Division, one of the highest leagues in the country.

In the fall of 1938 Polonia came to Warsaw, to face the renowned team of Polonia Warsaw. This friendly match was connected with Polish takeover of Trans-Olza and the Warsaw crowd enthusiastically welcomed players from Karwina.

In March 1939 Polonia was added to the Silesian A-Class (see: Lower Level Football Leagues in Interwar Poland), however its results were not impressive. The 1939 season was not finished due to the outbreak of World War II. During the war many club officials and supporters were murdered by Nazis.

In February 1948 communists in Czechoslovakia staged a coup d'état. In 1949 the club was incorporated into Polish Sokół organization and renamed Sokół-Polonia. It was liquidated in 1952 by communists when the social, cultural and sport life were curbed into several organizations controlled by communists.
