= Mizerov =

- Municipal part of Karviná
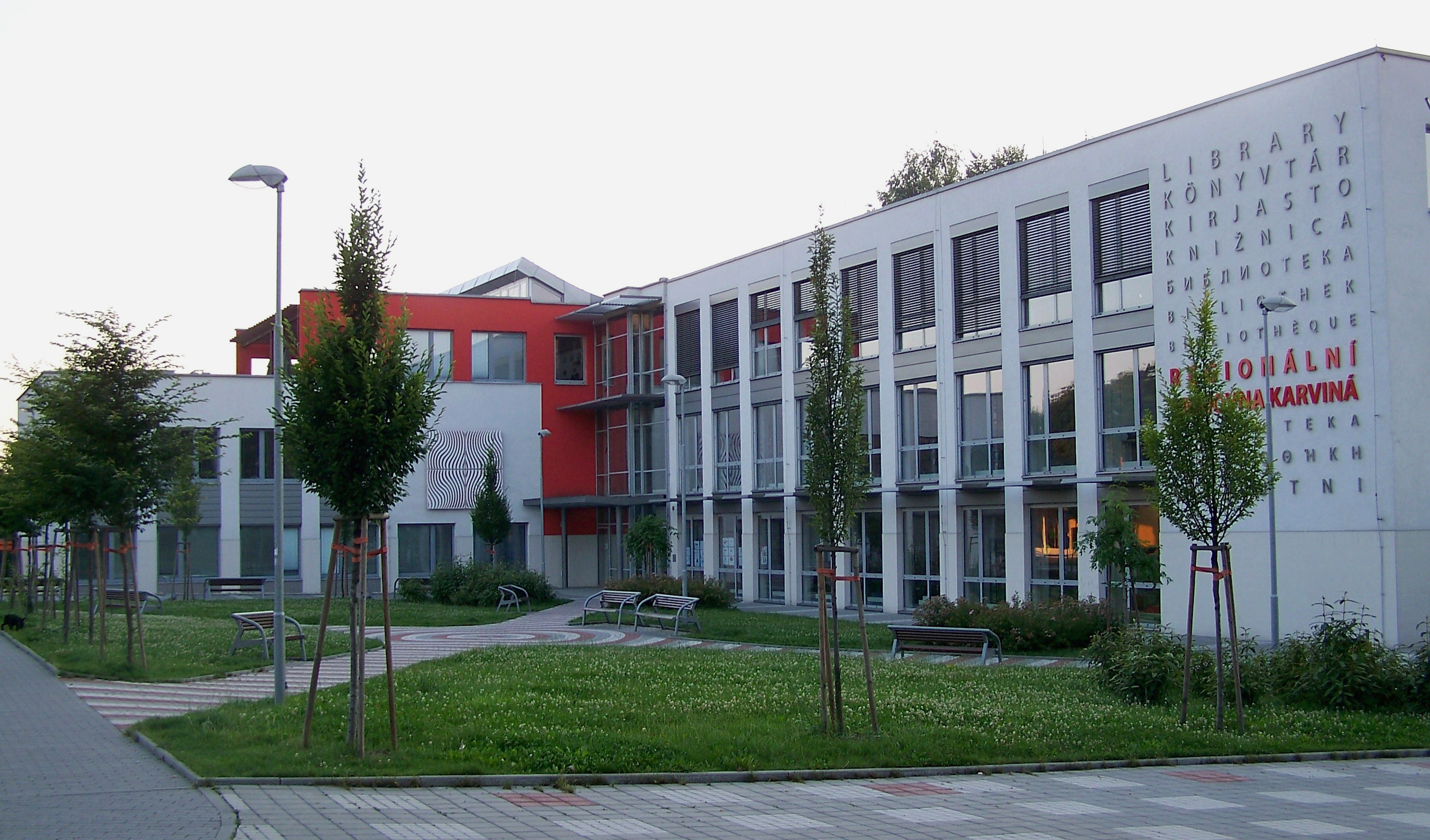
- Regional library
- Interactive map of Mizerov
- Coordinates: 49°51′37″N 18°33′20″E
- Country: Czech Republic
- Region: Moravian-Silesian
- District: Karviná
- Municipality: Karviná

Area
  - Total: 2.000 km^{2} (0.772 sq mi)

Population (2021)
  - Total: 10,595
  - Density: 5,297/km^{2} (13,720/sq mi)
- Time zone: UTC+1 (CET)
  - Summer (DST): UTC+2 (CEST)
- Postal code: 733 01, 734 01

Mizerov (Polish: Mizerów, German: Miserau) is a district of the city of Karviná in Karviná District, Moravian-Silesian Region, Czech Republic. It was formerly an independent village but was later incorporated into Fryštát, and later Karviná. It lies in the historical region of Cieszyn Silesia and was first mentioned in a written document in 1618. Mizerov has about 11,000 inhabitants.

== Demographics ==
Historical population

Year	Pop.	±%
1970	15,578	—
1980	17,007	+9.2%
1991	14,826	−12.8%

Year	Pop.	±%
2001	15,624	+5.4%
2011	12,077	−22.7%
2021	10,595	−12.3%

Source: Censuses
