= Šenov =

- Town
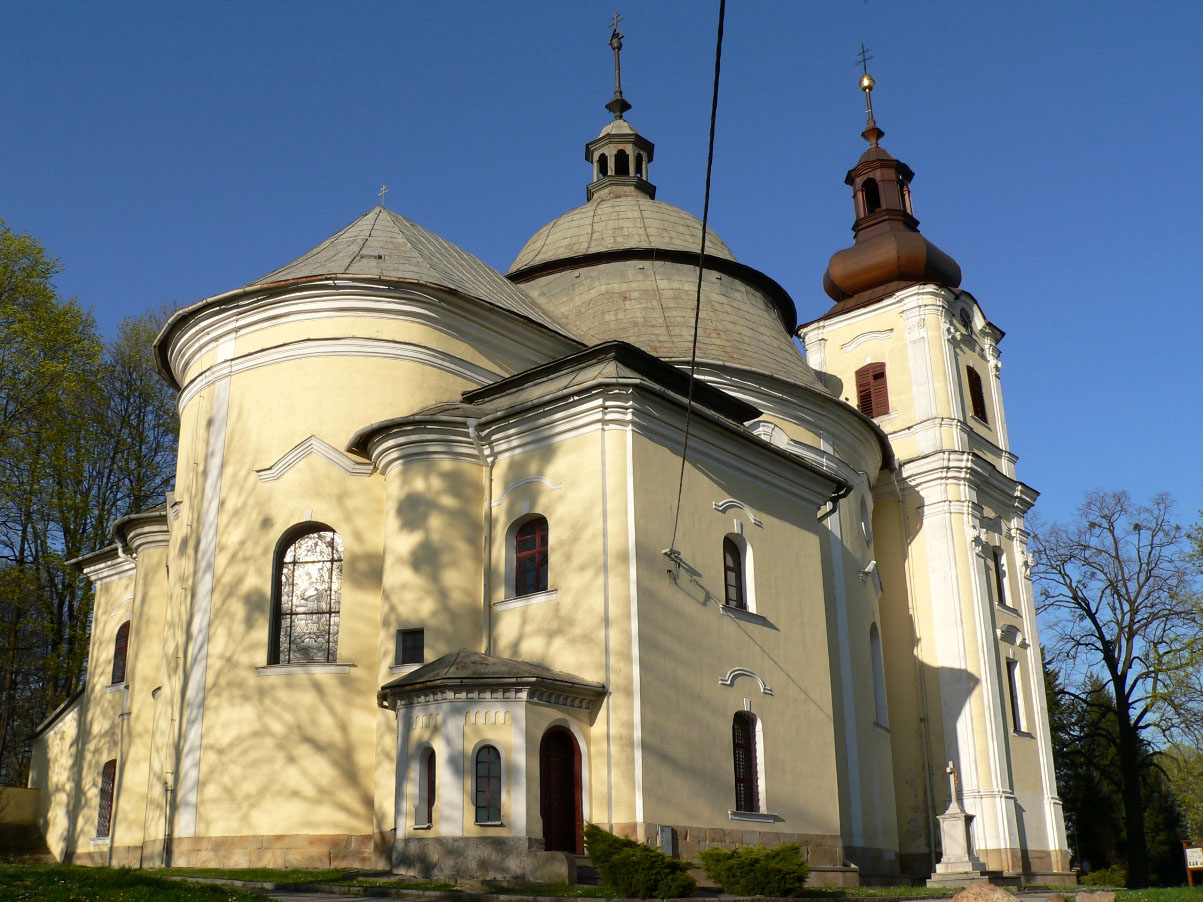
- Church of the Providence of God

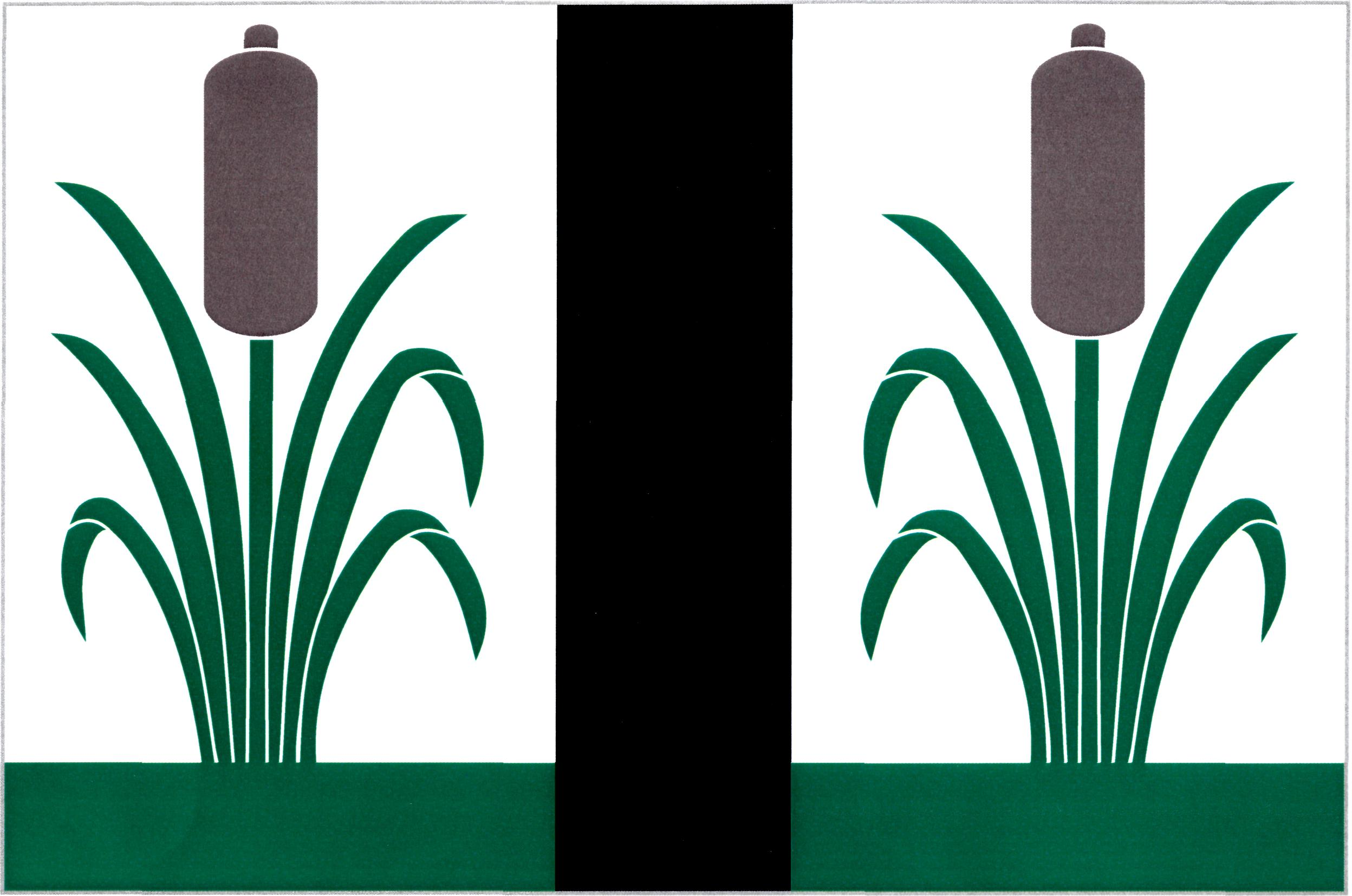
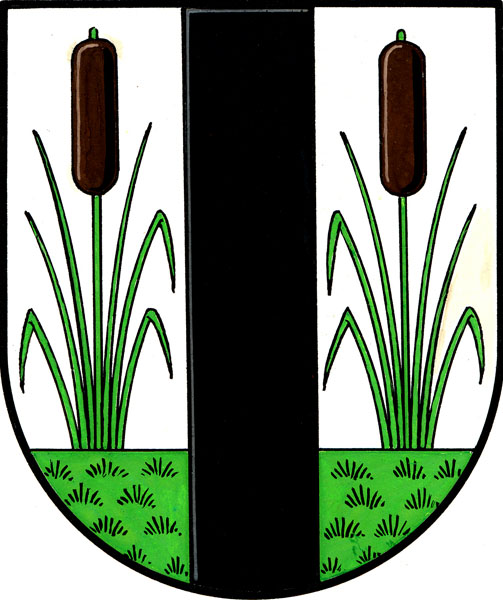
- Flag Coat of arms

- Location in the Czech Republic
- Coordinates: 49°47′3″N 18°22′47″E
- Country: Czech Republic
- Region: Moravian-Silesian
- District: Ostrava-City
- First mentioned: 1305

Government
  - Mayor: Tomáš Holuša

Area
  - Total: 16.63 km^{2} (6.42 sq mi)
- Elevation: 255 m (837 ft)

Population (2026-01-01)
  - Total: 6,642
  - Density: 399.4/km^{2} (1,034/sq mi)
- Time zone: UTC+1 (CET)
  - Summer (DST): UTC+2 (CEST)
- Postal code: 739 34
- Website: www.mesto-senov.cz

Šenov (Czech pronunciation: [ˈʃɛnof]; Polish: Szonów; German: Schönhof) is a town in Ostrava-City District in the Moravian-Silesian Region of the Czech Republic. It has about 6,600 inhabitants. The town is located on the Lučina River in the Ostrava Basin and creates a conurbation with the city of Ostrava.

Šenov was probably founded around 1290, but it became a town only in 1998. The main landmark of the town is the Church of the Providence of God.

== Geography ==
Šenov is located southeast of Ostrava, in its immediate vicinity. It is urbanistically fused with Ostrava-Bartovice. It lies in the Ostrava Basin, in the historical region of Cieszyn Silesia. The Lučina River flows through the town.

== History ==
Šenov was probably founded around 1290. The creation of the village was a part of a larger settlement campaign taking place in the late 13th century on the territory of what will be later known as Upper Silesia. The first written mention is in a Latin document of Diocese of Wrocław called Liber fundationis episcopatus Vratislaviensis from 1305 under its Latin name Sonow.

Politically the village belonged initially to the Duchy of Teschen, formed in 1290 in the process of feudal fragmentation of Poland and was ruled by a local branch of Piast dynasty. In 1327 the duchy became a fee of Kingdom of Bohemia, which after 1526 became part of the Habsburg monarchy.

The village could have become a seat of a Catholic parish if Schonwald mentioned in a register of Peter's Pence payment from 1447 among 50 parishes of Teschen deaconry was a temporary but similar name for the village at that time. After the 1540s Protestant Reformation prevailed in the Duchy of Teschen and a local Catholic church was taken over by Lutherans. It was taken from them (as one from around fifty buildings in the region) by a special commission and given back to the Roman Catholic Church on 25 March 1654.

In around 1576, Šenov was acquired by the noble family of Skrbenský of Hříště. Šenov was in their possession for almost 300 years. The family had built here a magnificent Renaissance castle, which stood in the area of today's park. It was demolished in 1927.

According to the Austro-Hungarian census of 1910, the municipality had 3,441 inhabitants 2,820 (82.6%) were Czech-speaking and 528 (15.5%) were Polish-speaking. The most populous religious groups were Roman Catholics with 2,883 (83.8%), followed by Protestants with 539 (15.7%).

In 1998, Šenov was promoted to a town.

== Demographics ==
Historical population

Year	Pop.	±%
1869	1,915	—
1880	2,178	+13.7%
1890	2,407	+10.5%
1900	2,970	+23.4%
1910	3,441	+15.9%

Year	Pop.	±%
1921	3,489	+1.4%
1930	4,264	+22.2%
1950	4,908	+15.1%
1961	4,772	−2.8%
1970	5,083	+6.5%

Year	Pop.	±%
1980	5,465	+7.5%
1991	5,330	−2.5%
2001	5,406	+1.4%
2011	6,013	+11.2%
2021	6,278	+4.4%

Source: Censuses

== Transport ==
Šenov is located on the railway line Ostrava–Český Těšín.

== Sights ==
The main landmark of Šenov is the Church of the Providence of God. It was built in the Baroque style in 1764.

== Notable people ==
- Wacław Olszak (1868–1939), Polish medical doctor and politician
- Vilém Wünsche (1900–1984), painter, graphic artist and illustrator

== Twin towns – sister cities ==
Šenov is twinned with:

- Strumień, Poland
