= Przeczek =

Przeczek is a Polish surname. Notable people with the surname include:

- Gustaw Przeczek (1913–1974), Polish writer, poet, teacher, and activist
- Wilhelm Przeczek (1936–2006), Polish writer and poet
