= Lázně Darkov =

- municipal part of the Czech Republic
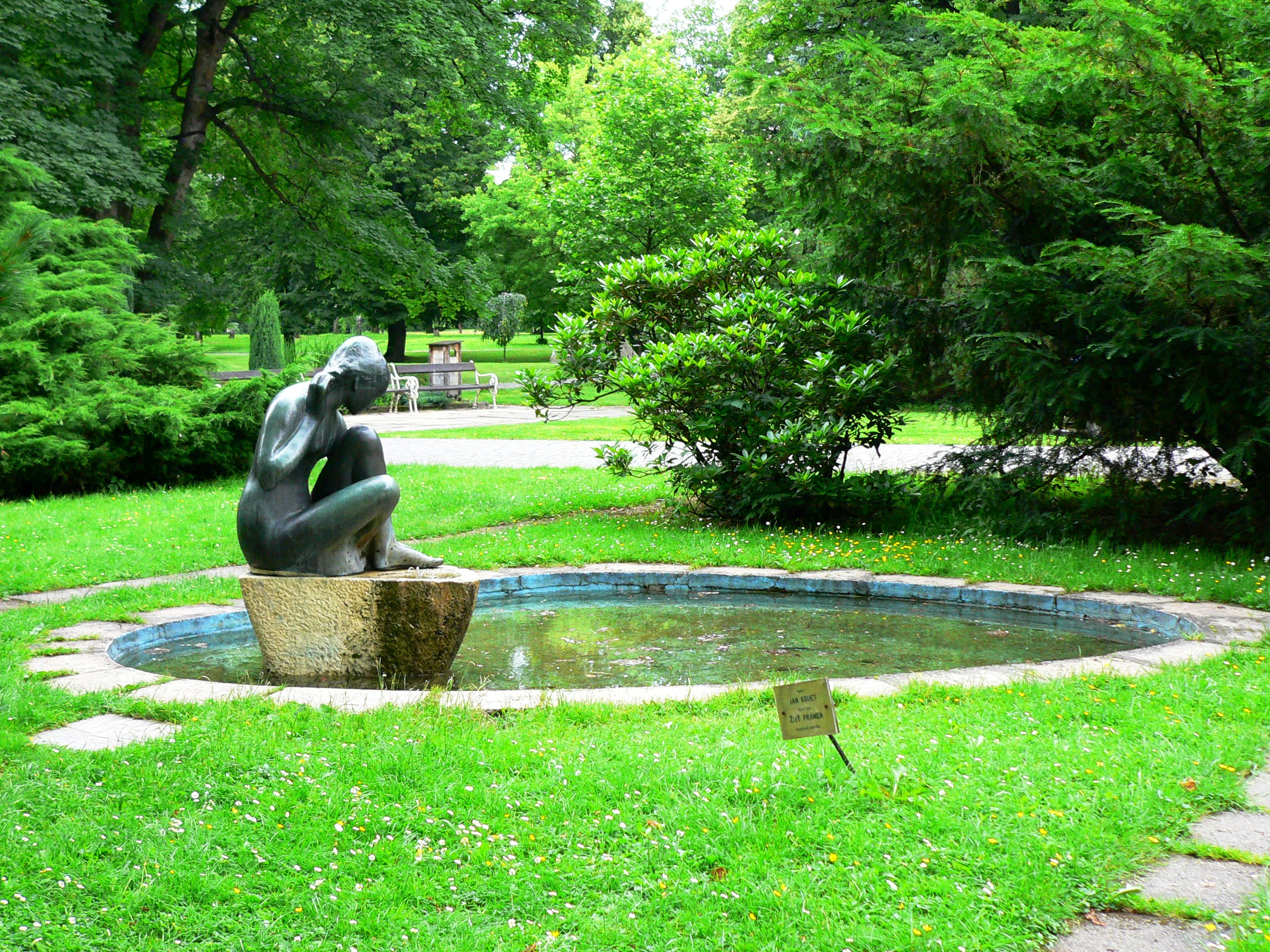

- Coordinates: 49°50′24″N 18°32′34″E
- Country: Czech Republic

Area
  - Total: 5.418 km^{2} (2.092 sq mi)

Population (26 March 2021)
  - Total: 363
  - Density: 67.0/km^{2} (174/sq mi)

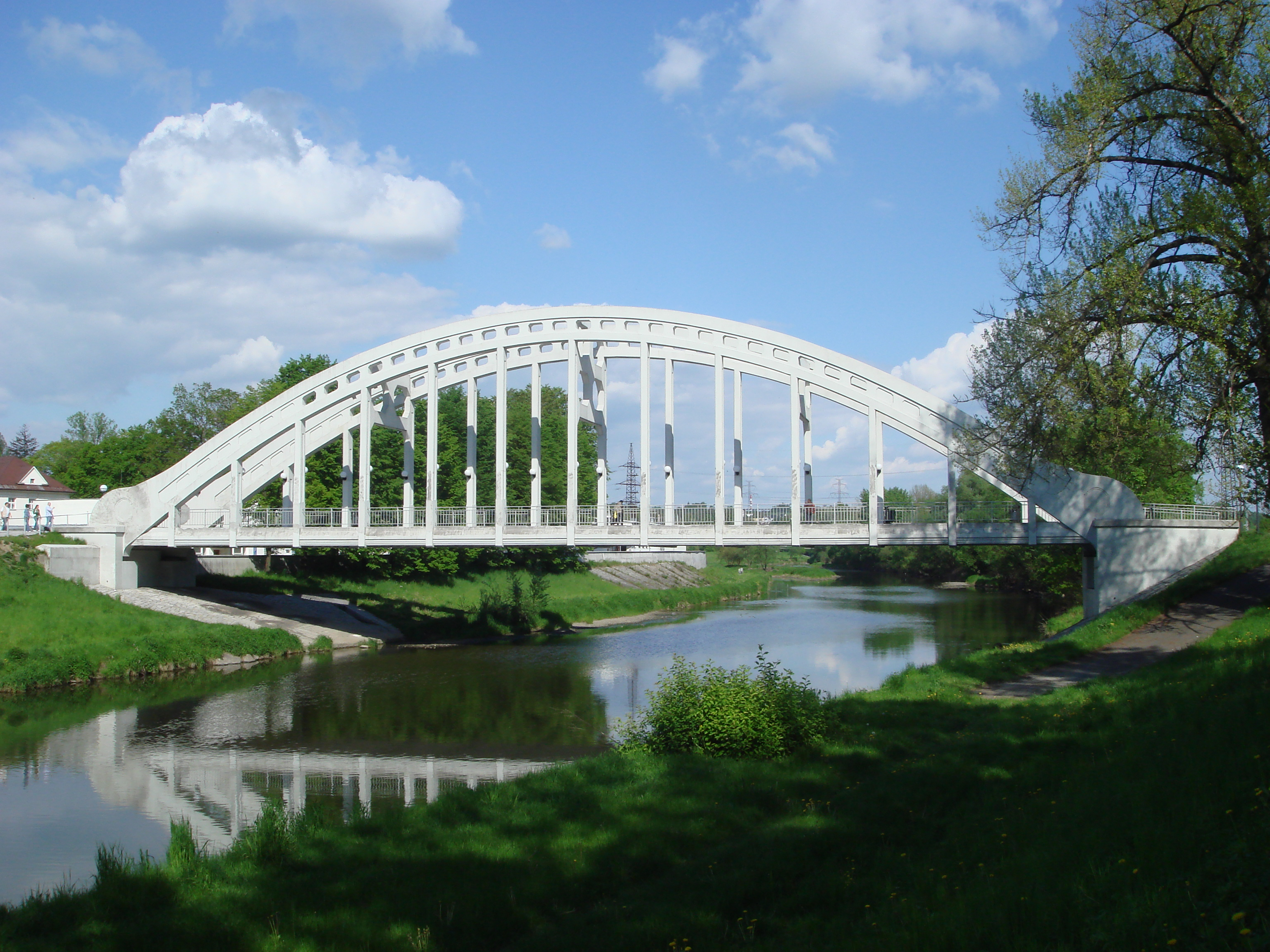
Darkov bridge on the Olza River

Lázně Darkov (formerly Darkov; Polish: Darków, German: Darkau) is a spa village and administrative part of Karviná in Karviná District, Moravian-Silesian Region, Czech Republic. Till 1948 it was a separate municipality. It lies on the Olza River in the historical region of Cieszyn Silesia. In 2011, Lázně Darkov had a population of 301.

== Etymology ==
The name is possessive in origin derived from personal name Darek. After the World War II the word Lázně (meaning "spa") was added.

== History ==
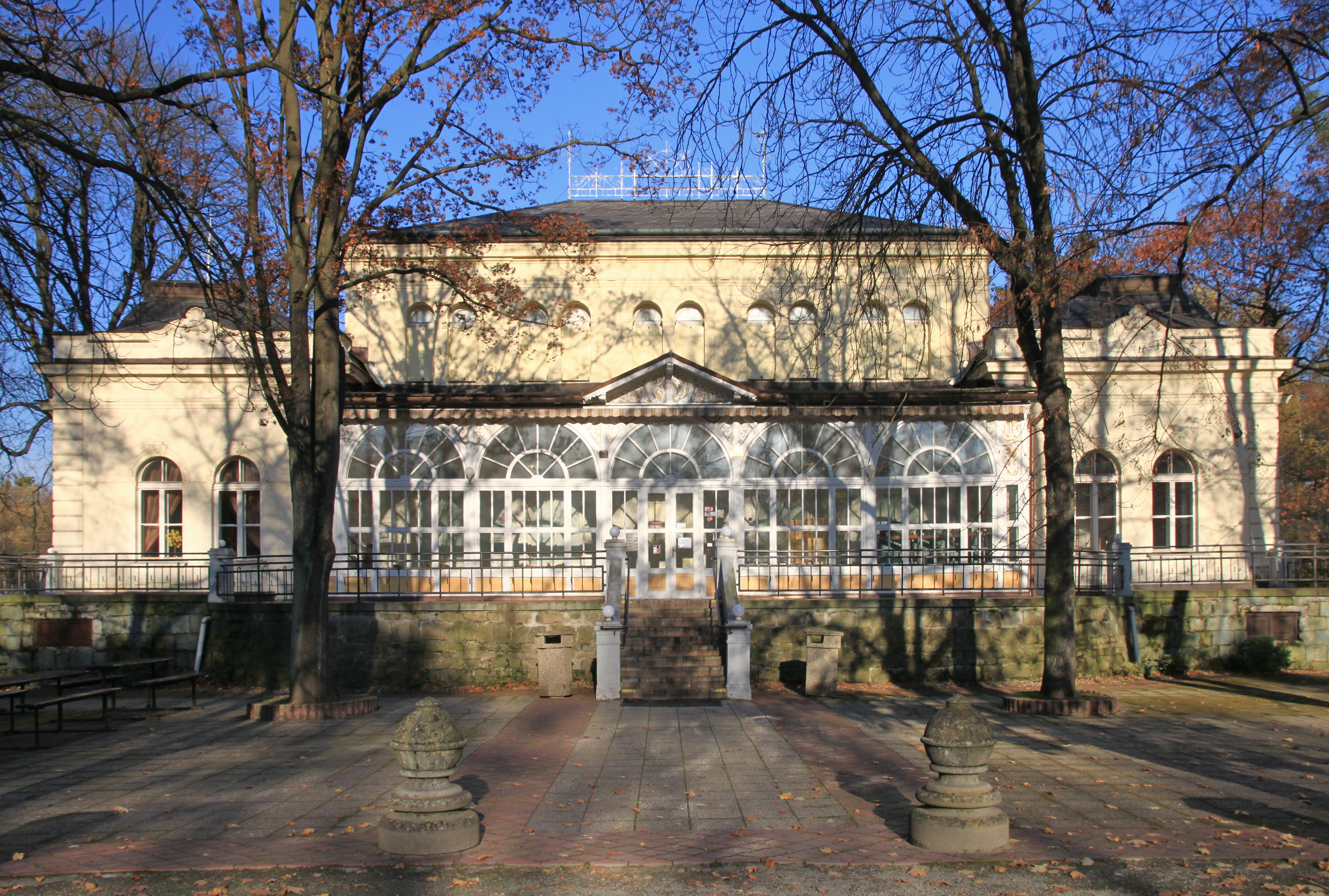
Spa House in the Spa Park

Some sources state that the village was first mentioned in a Latin document of Diocese of Wrocław called Liber fundationis episcopatus Vratislaviensis from around 1305 as item in Bertholdi villa debent esse XLV mansi, however it is unlikely and disputed. (Note: This leaves the question what happened to Bertholdi villa, as it indeed lay somewhere in the vicinity but is now considered lost. It was probably absorbed by another nearby village, but not necessarily by Darkov.) Surely it was later mentioned in a written document in 1447 as Darkow. Politically it belonged initially to the Duchy of Teschen, a fee of the Kingdom of Bohemia, which after 1526 became part of the Habsburg monarchy. In 1573 it was sold as one of a dozen villages and the town of Freistadt and formed a state country split from the Duchy of Teschen.

After the Revolutions of 1848 in the Austrian Empire a modern municipal division was introduced in the re-established Austrian Silesia. The village as a municipality was subscribed at first to the political district of Teschen and the legal district of Freistadt, which in 1868 became an independent political district. According to the censuses from 1880–1910 the population of the municipality grew from 614 in 1880 to 2,305 in 1910 with a majority being native Polish-speakers (dropping from 97.4% in 1880 to 94.8% in 1900, then growing to 96.5% in 1910) accompanied by German-speaking (between 1.8% and 3.9%) and Czech-speaking people (between 0.3% and 1.3%). In terms of religion in 1910 the majority were Roman Catholics (2,042 or 88.6%), followed by Protestants (223 or 9.7%) and Jews (39 or 1.7%). The village was also traditionally inhabited by Silesian Lachs, speaking Cieszyn Silesian dialect.

After World War I, the fall of Austria-Hungary, the Polish–Czechoslovak War and the division of Cieszyn Silesia in 1920, the village became part of Czechoslovakia. Following the Munich Agreement, in October 1938 together with the Zaolzie region it was annexed by Poland, administratively organised in Frysztat County of Silesian Voivodeship. The village was then annexed by Nazi Germany at the beginning of World War II. After the war it was restored to Czechoslovakia.

== Economy ==
The village is well known for its Darkov Spa facilities, established in 1866 which treats various diseases, mostly diseases of locomotive organs, conditions after accidents and operations etc. It has one of the best iodine-bromine waters in Central Europe.

Darkov together with neighboring villages suffered of under-mining caused by nearby coal mines. This affected the character of the village as many inhabitants relocated to nearby villages and towns, thus seriously depopulating the village.

== Sights ==
Prominent landmark is the Karviná-Darkov bridge on the Olza built in 1922–1925, located just near the spa. In 1991 it was inscribed on the state register of technical monuments. It was renovated in the 2000s.

== Notable people ==
- Józef Ondrusz, Polish folklorist and writer
