= Karviná-Darkov bridge =

Darkov Bridge
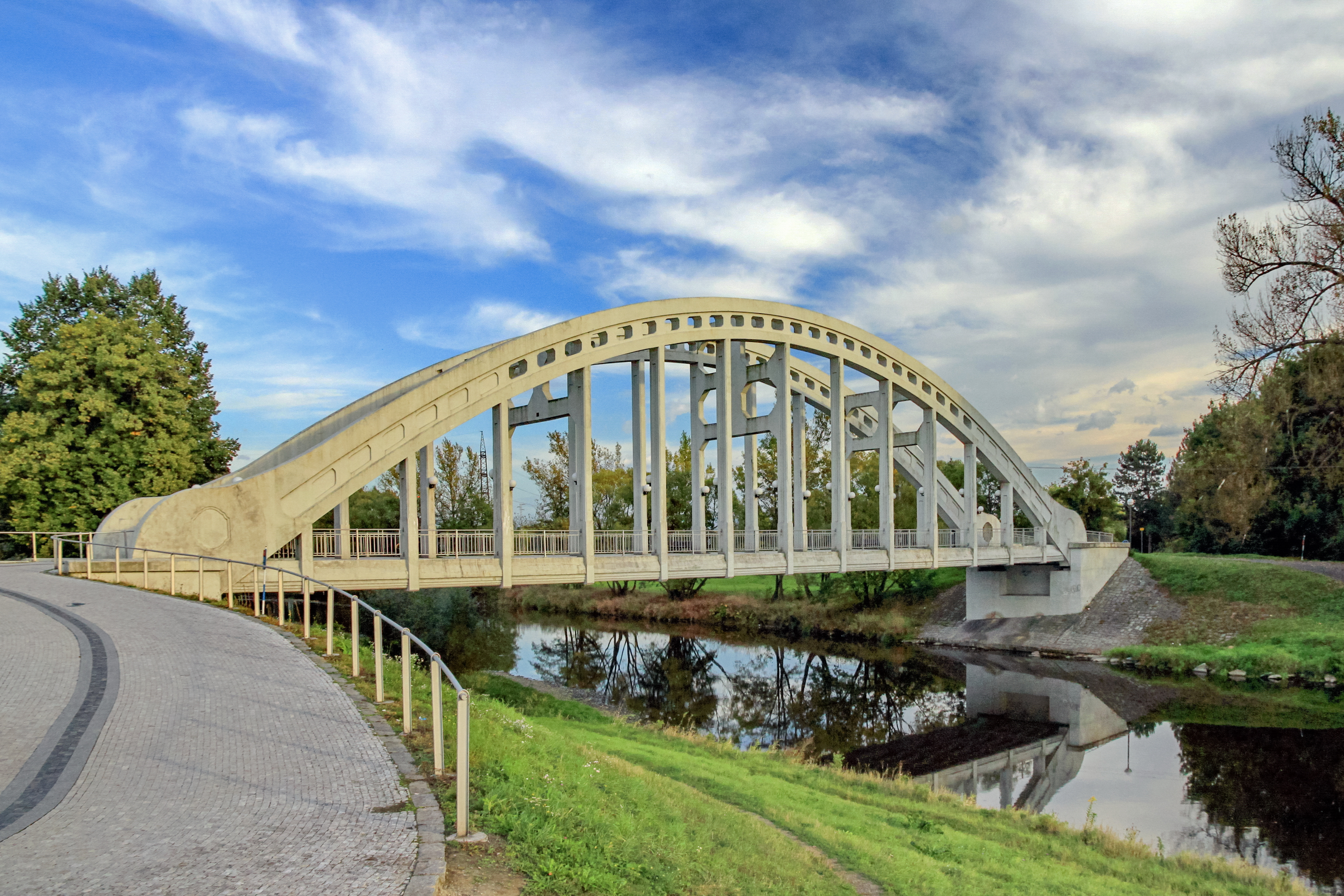
- Darkov Bridge in 2012
- Coordinates: 49.842231°N 18.546392°E
- Crosses: Olza
- Locale: Darkov, Karviná, Czech Republic
- Official name: Most Sokolovských hrdinů
- Heritage status: Cultural monument

Characteristics
- Material: Reinforced concrete
- Total length: 55.8 metres (183 ft)
- Width: 5.6 metres (18 ft)
- Height: 6.25 metres (20.5 ft)

History
- Architect: Franz Rabe
- Construction start: 1922
- Construction end: 1925
- Opened: 1925

Location
- Interactive map of Darkov Bridge

Karviná-Darkov bridge (officially in Czech: Most Sokolovských hrdinů, meaning "The Sokolovo Heroes' Bridge", locally called Darkov Bridge) is a reinforced concrete road bridge over the Olza River in Karviná-Darkov, Czech Republic. It is a distinctive dominant of Darkov. The bridge is declared a Czech cultural monument.

== History ==
The bridge, spanning the Olza River and connecting parts of Darkov, was designed by the Viennese builder Ing. Franz Rabe. The construction began in 1922 and was completed in 1925. During the floods of 1997, the Olza River nearly flooded the bridge. In 2003–2004 the bridge underwent a reconstruction. The entire reinforced concrete structure was re-mediated and the whole bridge body was lifted two meters above the original leveling, at the same time preserving the original wall reliefs. In the early years the bridge experienced a heavy car traffic. Since 2004 it has been designated for pedestrians and cyclists use only. It has been a Czech cultural monument since 1991. It has been part of the Karviná heritage zone since 1992.

== Description ==
Reinforced concrete arched bridge with neo-baroque elements represents a unique technical solution. The bridge deck is suspended on two longitudinal arches. A lightweight reinforced concrete Vierendeel beam in the upper arch was used for the construction. The bridge is reinforced transversely with three triples of horizontal bars one above the other, interspersed with a vertical middle bar.

The bridge height is 6.25 meters, the lower deck is 55.8 meters long and the bridge is 5.6 meters wide.

== Gold coin ==
From 2011 to 2015, the Czech National Bank issued ten commemorative gold coins in the Bridges of the Czech Republic set. In 2014, as part of the set, the arch bridge at Darkov was pictured on the 5000 CZK coin designed by then-student Asamat Baltaev from the Higher Professional School in Jablonec nad Nisou.

== Gallery ==
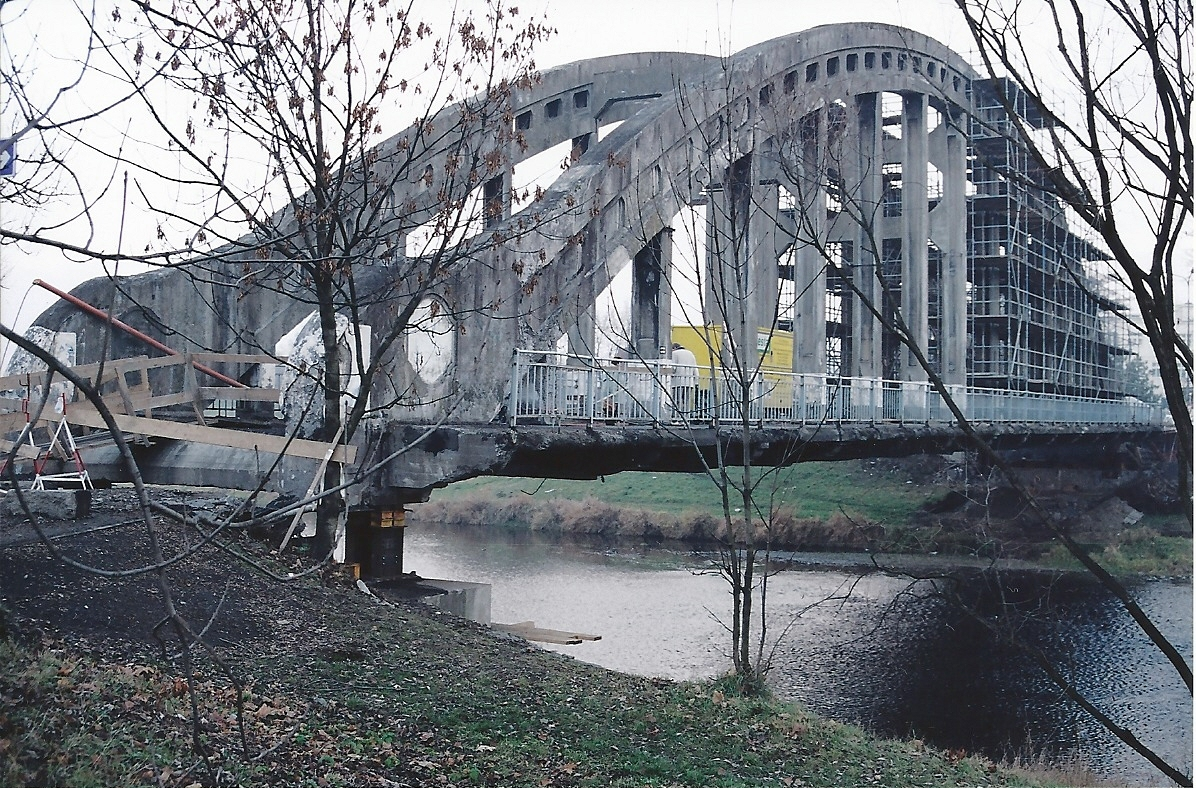
Before the reconstruction

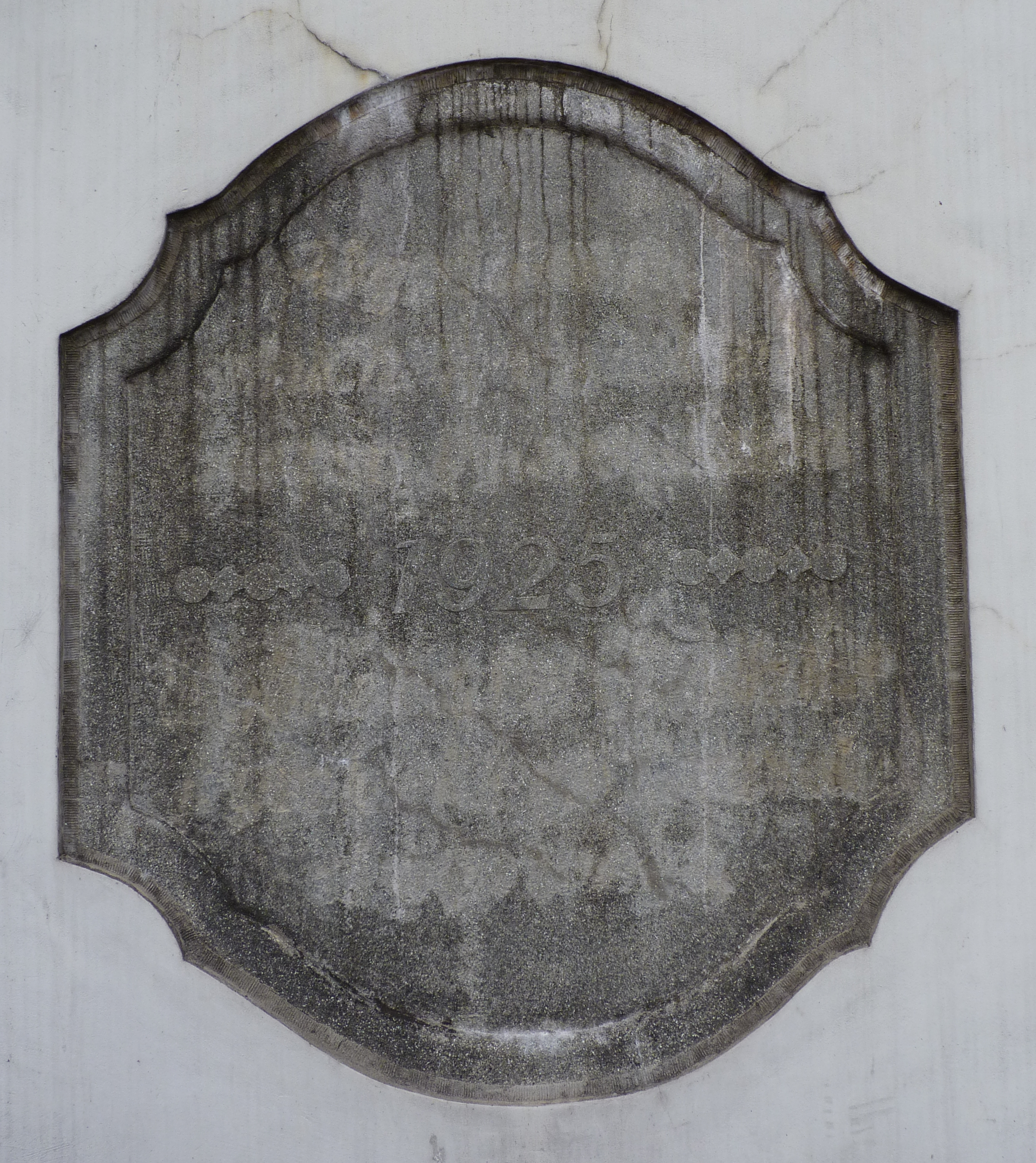
Relief

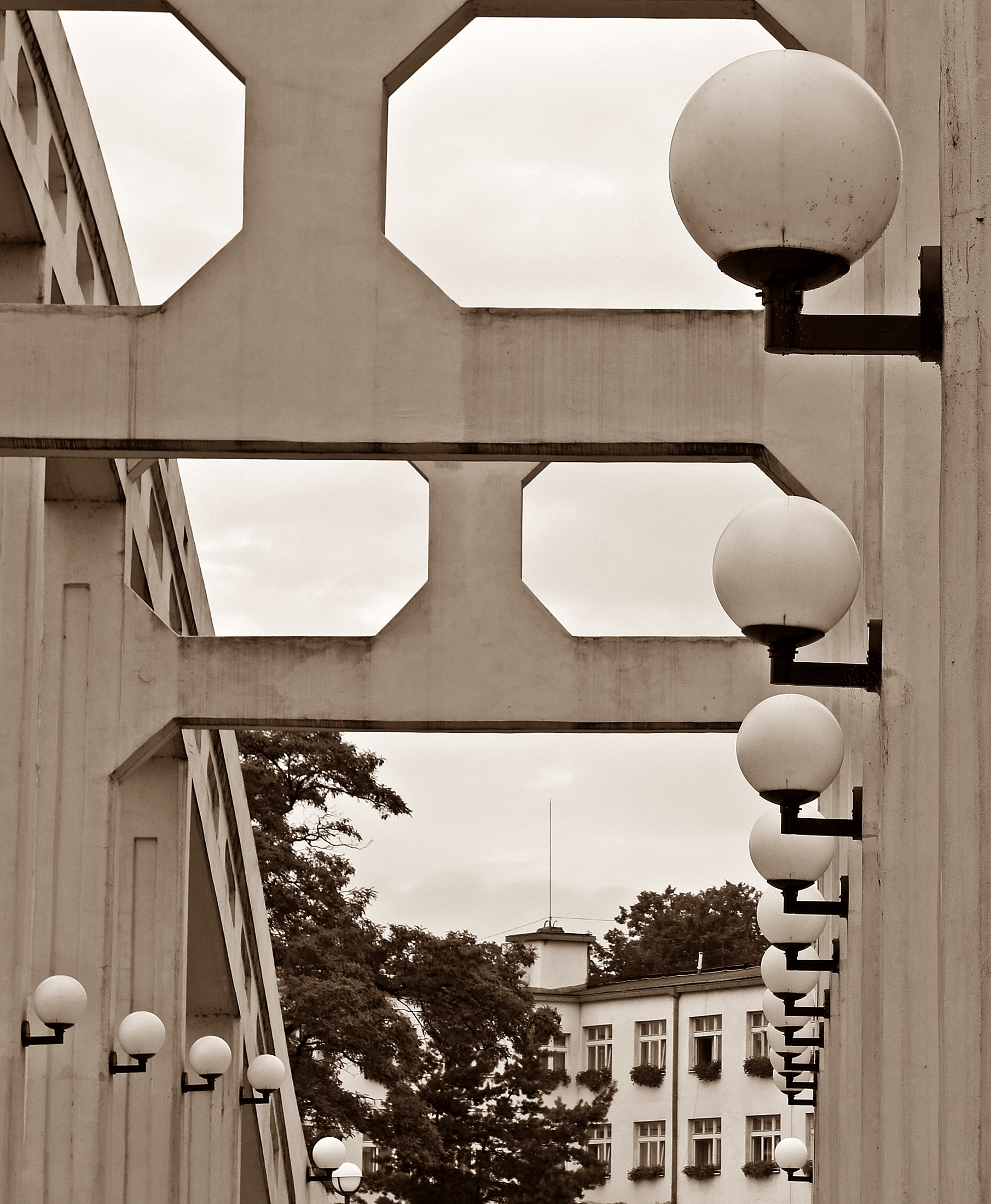
Reinforcement

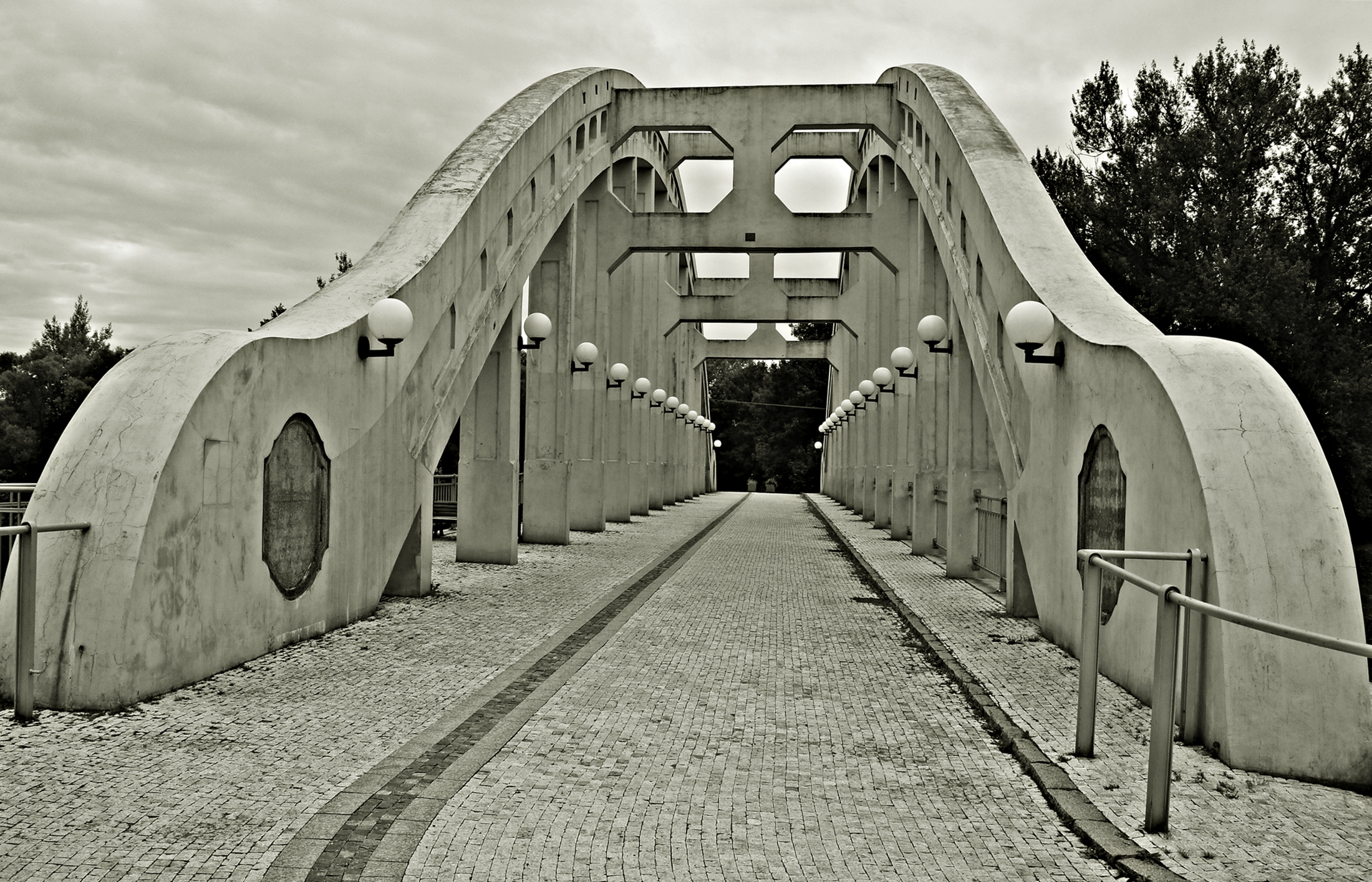
Bridge deck

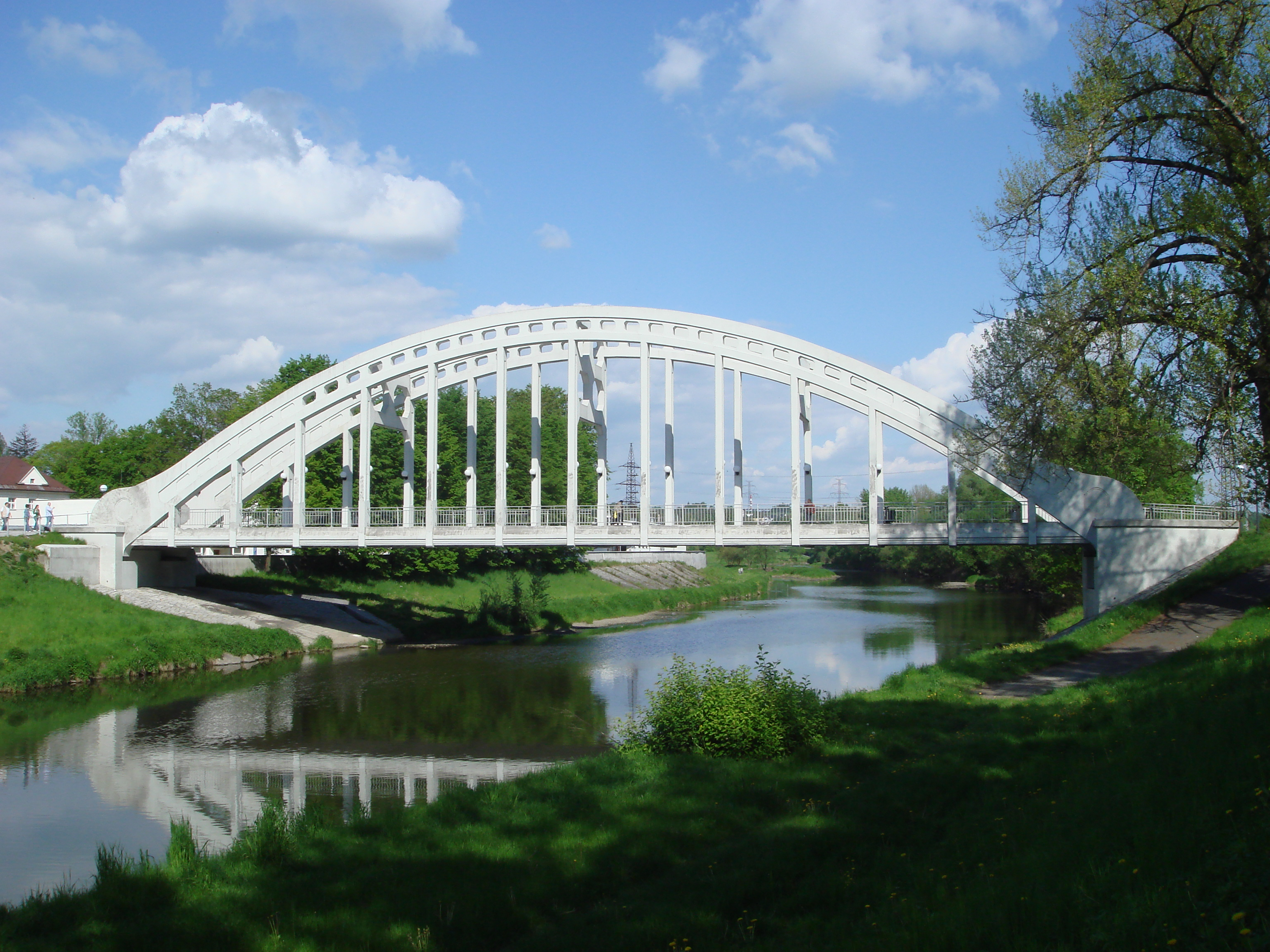
After the reconstruction
