= Vilém Wünsche =

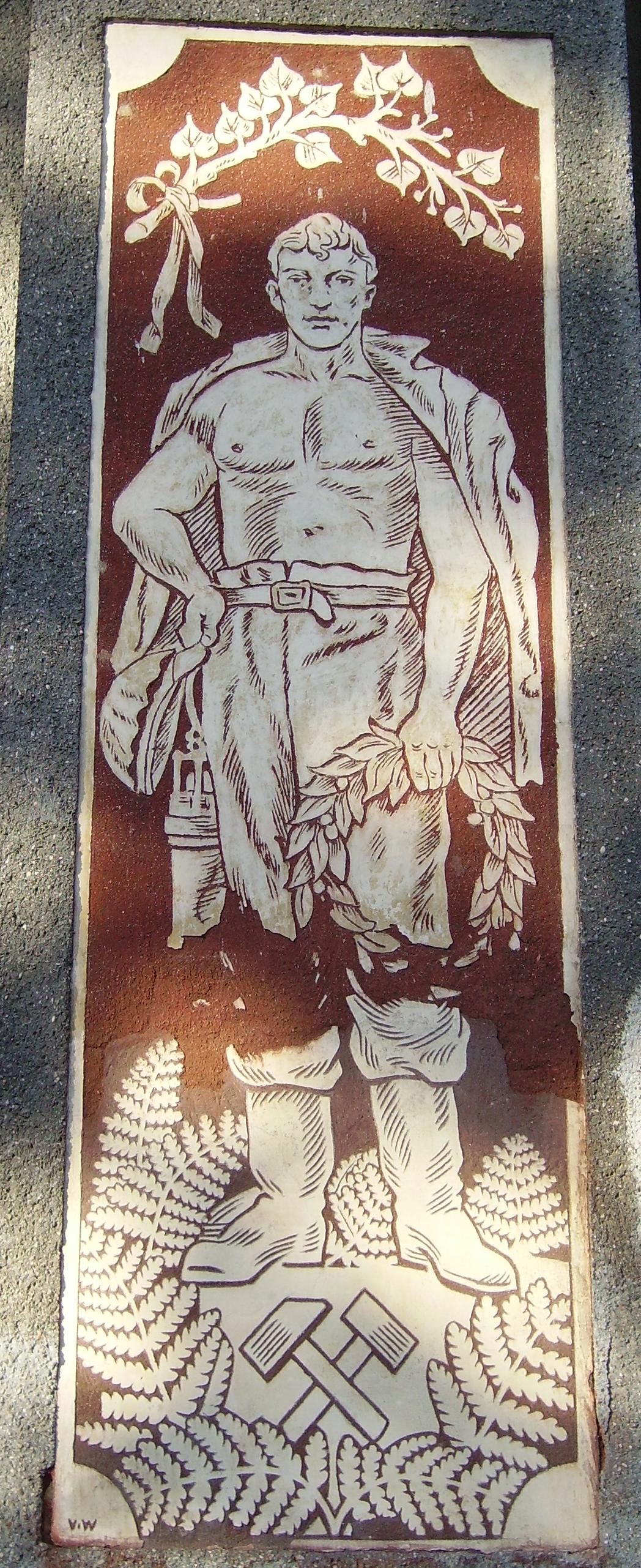
Work of Vilém Wünsche

Vilém Wünsche (1 December 1900 in Šenov – 3 May 1984 in Šenov) was a Czech painter, graphic artist and illustrator. His artworks are characterized with connections to the theme of Ostrava and the local life of afflicted miners in his time.

In 1922, he studied at the School of Applied Arts in Prague and in 1923–1930 was a pupil at the Academy of Fine Arts. His son Otakar is a member of Communist Party of Bohemia and Moravia and a former town representative of Šenov.

== See also ==
- List of Czech painters
