= Karviná =

- Statutory city
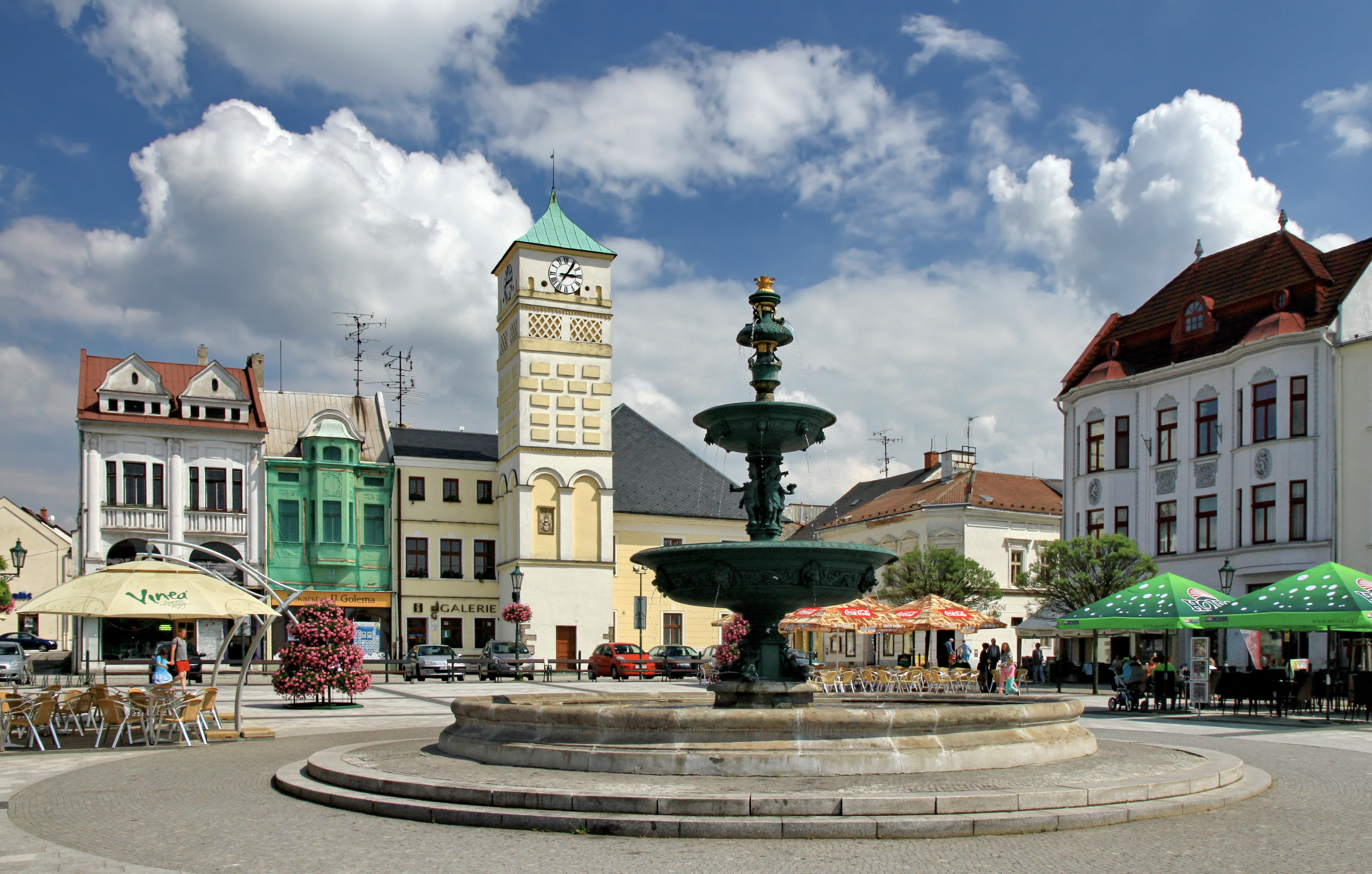
- Town square in Karviná-Fryštát

- Flag Coat of arms

- Location in the Czech Republic
- Coordinates: 49°51′15″N 18°32′34″E
- Country: Czech Republic
- Region: Moravian-Silesian
- District: Karviná
- First mentioned: 1268

Government
  - Mayor: Jan Wolf (ŽPK)

Area
  - Total: 57.52 km^{2} (22.21 sq mi)
- Elevation: 221 m (725 ft)

Population (2026-01-01)
  - Total: 48,684
  - Density: 846.4/km^{2} (2,192/sq mi)
- Time zone: UTC+1 (CET)
  - Summer (DST): UTC+2 (CEST)
- Postal codes: 733 01, 733 24, 734 01, 735 06
- Website: www.karvina.cz

Karviná (Czech pronunciation: [ˈkarvɪnaː]; Polish: Karwina, German: Karwin) is a city in the Moravian-Silesian Region of the Czech Republic. It has about 49,000 inhabitants. It lies on the Olza River in the Ostrava Basin, on the border with Poland, in the historical region of Cieszyn Silesia.

Karviná is known as an industrial city with tradition in coal mining. The hard coal was mined here from the mid-18th century until 2021 and determined the economic and demographic development of the entire region. The historic centre in Karviná-Fryštát is well preserved and is protected as an urban monument zone.

== Administrative division ==
Karviná consists of nine municipal parts (in brackets population according to the 2021 census):

- Doly (20)
- Fryštát (2,432)
- Hranice (7,071)
- Lázně Darkov (363)
- Louky (381)
- Mizerov (10,595)
- Nové Město (12,531)
- Ráj (14,453)
- Staré Město (627)

== Etymology ==
According to the most probable theory, the name is derived from the Old Slavic words karw ('bull') and karwa ('cow'). The suffix -ina indicates that it was a place for grazing cows.

== Geography ==
Karviná is located about 17 kilometres (11 mi) east of Ostrava on the border with Poland, in the historical region of Cieszyn Silesia. It lies in the Ostrava Basin. The highest point is the hill Rájský kopec at 306 m (1,004 ft) above sea level. The city is situated on the right bank of the Olza River. The Stonávka River joins the Olza in the territory of Karviná. The municipal territory is rich in fishponds.

== History ==
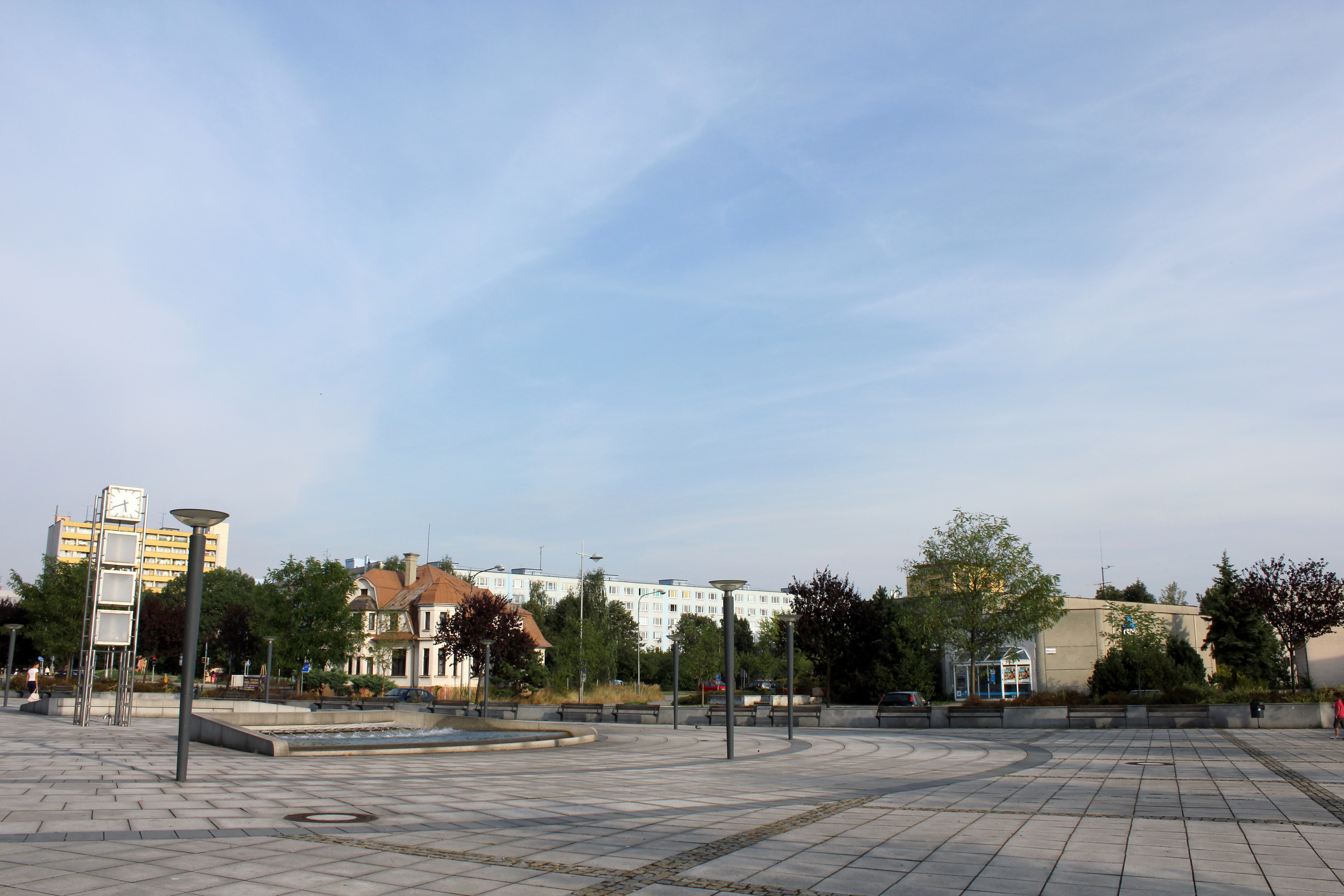
The square Univerzitní náměstí

The first written mention of Karviná is from 1268. It was located on a trade route, which helped its development. It gained various privileges, but the prosperity ended with the Thirty Years' War.

The discovery of hard coal deposits in Karviná in the second half of the 18th century brought a major turnaround in the economic development of Karviná and the entire region. The less significant village of Karviná near the important town of Fryštát gained importance for the whole of Austria-Hungary.

Following World War I, the area was contested by Poland and Czechoslovakia, and after the split of Cieszyn Silesia in 1920 it became a part of Czechoslovakia as the main mining centre in the country. In 1923, it gained city rights.

In October 1938, the area was annexed by Poland as part of the region known as Trans-Olza, and during World War II it was occupied by Nazi Germany. The German occupying administration operated a Gestapo prison in the city, and several forced labour camps, including a Polenlager solely for Poles, a camp solely for Jews, and a subcamp of the Nazi prison in Cieszyn. After the war, the area again became a part of Czechoslovakia.

In 1948, Karviná, Fryštát, and the surrounding villages of Darkov, Ráj and Staré Město were merged into one city named Karviná. The coat of arms of Fryštát was chosen as the coat of arms of Karviná. Fryštát became the historical centre of this industrial city. The period after World War II is characterised by the economic orientation on heavy industry. In 2003, Karviná became a statutory city.

== Demographics ==
According to the 1980 census, at its peak, Karviná had 78,546 inhabitants. In the 21st century, the population dropped under 50,000. According to the 2021 census, 5.1% of the population are Poles and 4.4% of the population are Slovaks (including people with two ethnicities). The Polish population has been historically declining. In the past the town had a significant German community.

Historical population

Year	Pop.	±%
1869	8,900	—
1880	11,895	+33.7%
1890	16,305	+37.1%
1900	24,195	+48.4%
1910	29,880	+23.5%

Year	Pop.	±%
1921	35,748	+19.6%
1930	37,645	+5.3%
1950	38,465	+2.2%
1961	49,418	+28.5%
1970	78,546	+58.9%

Year	Pop.	±%
1980	78,334	−0.3%
1991	68,405	−12.7%
2001	65,141	−4.8%
2011	56,897	−12.7%
2021	48,473	−14.8%

Source: Censuses

== Economy ==
Karviná was one of the most important coal mining centres in the country. Together with Ostrava and several neighbouring towns, it formed the industrial Ostrava-Karviná Coal Basin. Due to low profitability, however, mining was curtailed and in 2021, two mines were closed. From this year, coal mining as the main economic activity in the city is gradually replaced by revitalisation of the landscape after mining, carried out by the former mining company OKD. Mining in the region was completely stopped in 2026.

== Transport ==
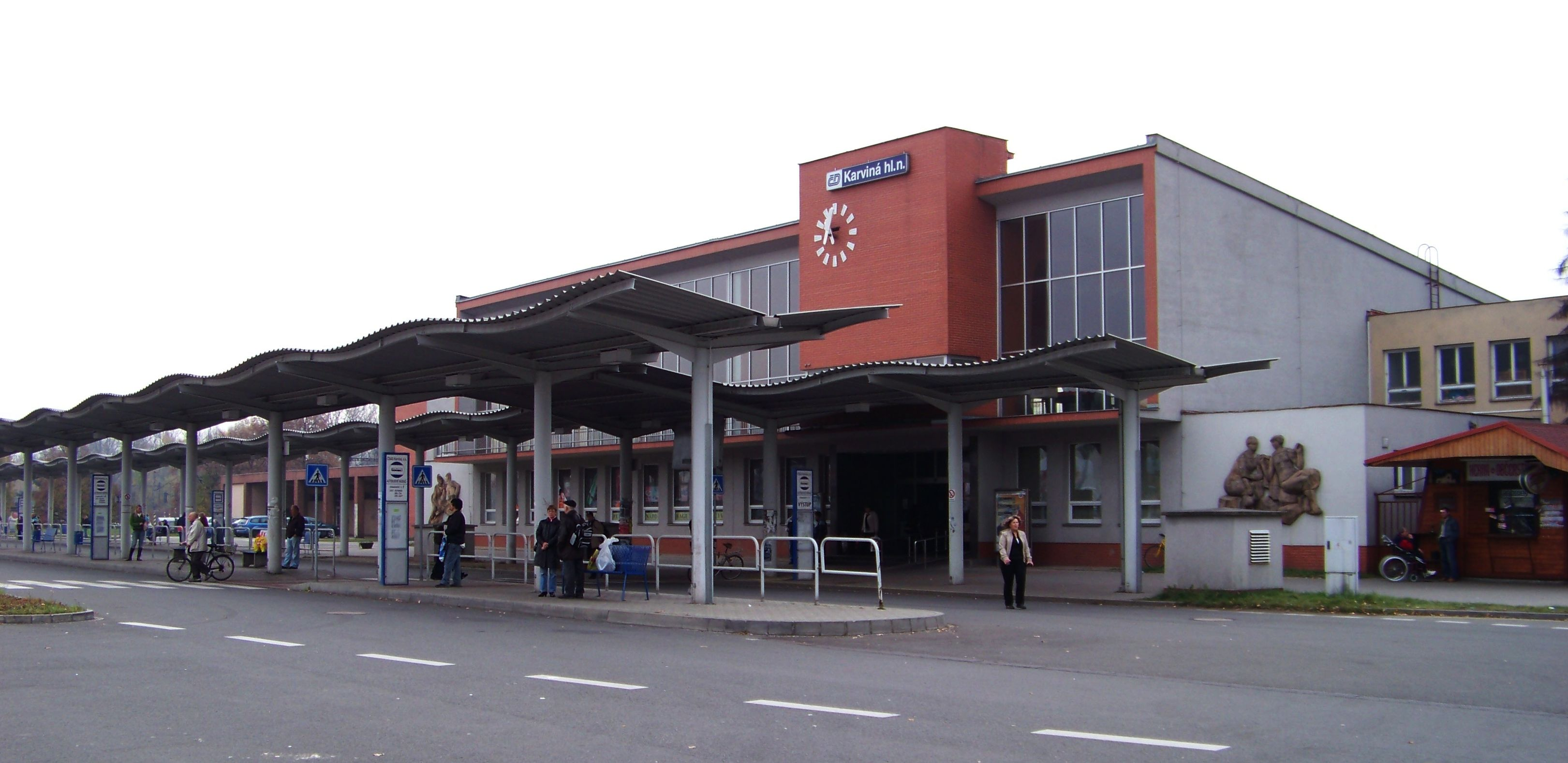
Main railway station and bus terminal

The city lies at the crossroads of two first class roads: I/59, which connects it with Ostrava, and I/67 (from Český Těšín to Bohumín).

Karviná is located on the international railway line from Prague to Žilina in Slovakia. It is also located on the regional line Ostrava–Mosty u Jablunkova. In addition to the main station, there is a stop in Louky.

== Education ==
Karviná is the centre of education of the region and has a wide range of specialised secondary schools, including the School of Business Administration of the Silesian University in Opava.

== Sport ==
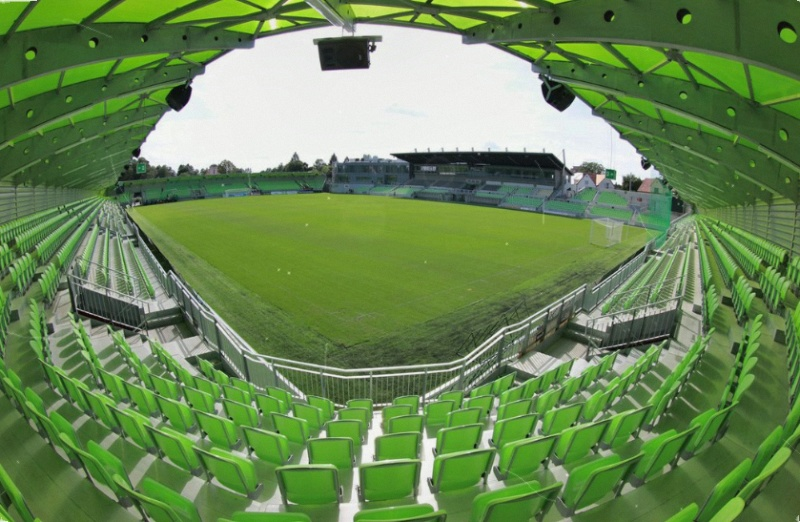
Městský stadion, a football stadium

Karviná, as a multi-ethnic city of Cieszyn Silesia, was a home to many football clubs established by particular ethnic groups after World War I. At that time many football clubs within the Polish, German, Czech and Jewish communities were founded. The best known and most successful Polish club was PKS Polonia Karwina, founded in 1919. After World War II, the German and Jewish clubs were not reestablished. The Czech and Polish clubs existed until the 1950s, when as a part of a communist unification of sport in Czechoslovakia, the Czech clubs were joined to ZSJ OKD Mír Karviná and the Polish Polonia Karwina was incorporated into that club.

In modern times, the city had two football clubs: FC Karviná and MFK Karviná. FC Karviná played two seasons between 1996 and 1999 in the Czech First League. In 2008, FC Karviná merged into MFK Karviná. MFK Karviná has been playing in the Czech First League relatively regularly since 2016.

Karviná is also home to a successful handball club, HCB Karviná, which became twice Czechoslovak champions and eleven times Czech champions. Other sport clubs in the city include the ice hockey team SK Karviná, playing in the lower division, and the athletics club, Tennis, gymnastics and ice skating are also popular and established sports within the region.

== Sights ==
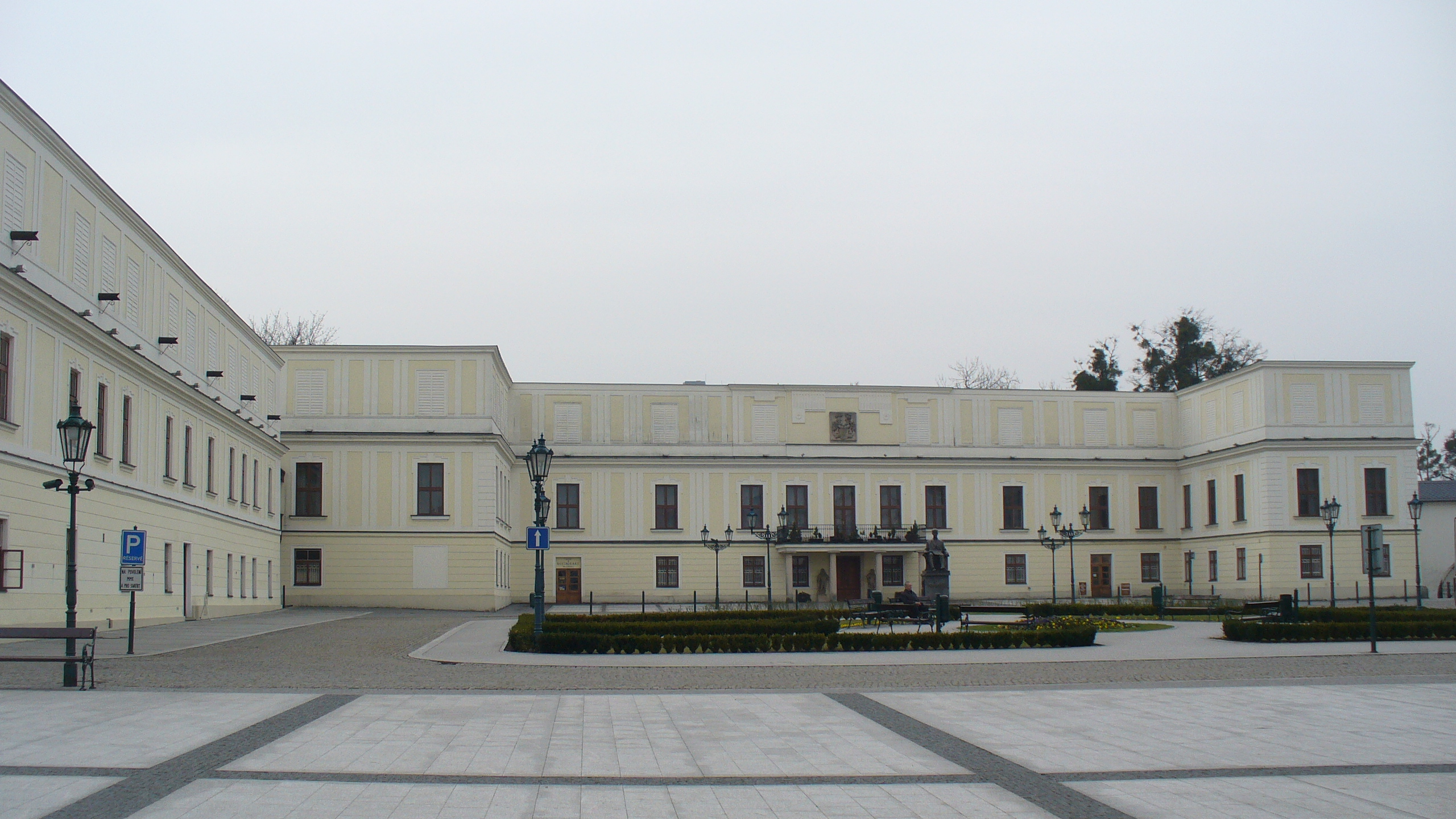
Fryštát Castle

The last remnant of the original village of Karviná is the Church of Saint Peter of Alcántara in Doly. It was built in the Baroque style. After the area was undermined during the coal mining, it fell by 36 metres (118 ft) and inclined 6.8° south of the vertical axis.

Today the historic centre is located in Fryštát part of Karviná. The main sight is the Fryštát Castle. The original structure was rebuilt and reconstructed several times, after it was finally rebuilt in the Empire style in 1800. In the same time, the English castle park was founded. Nowadays it is owned by the city and since 1997 it has been open to the public.

The Sokolovských hrdinů Bridge in Darkov is a reinforced concrete road bridge built in 1922–1925, protected as a cultural monument.

== Notable people ==
- Wacław Olszak (1868–1939), Polish mayor of Karviná (1929–1936)
- Emanuel Grim (1883–1950), Polish Catholic priest and writer
- Gustaw Morcinek (1891–1963), Polish writer
- Louis Kentner (1905–1987), Hungarian-British pianist
- Dana Zátopková (1922–2020), athlete
- Wilhelm Przeczek (1936–2006), Polish writer
- Dáša Vokatá (born 1954), singer-songwriter
- Miloš Doležal (born 1966), musician
- Eva Kurfürstová (born 1977), alpine skier
- Radek Štěpánek (born 1978), tennis player
- Petra Němcová (born 1979), model
- Jaroslav Bába (born 1984), athlete
- Denisa Rosolová (born 1986), athlete
- Marie Doležalová (born 1987), actress

== Twin towns – sister cities ==
Karviná is twinned with:

- Jastrzębie-Zdrój, Poland
- Jaworzno, Poland
- Kaili, China
- Rybnik, Poland
- Wodzisław Śląski, Poland
