= Bartovice =

- Administrative part
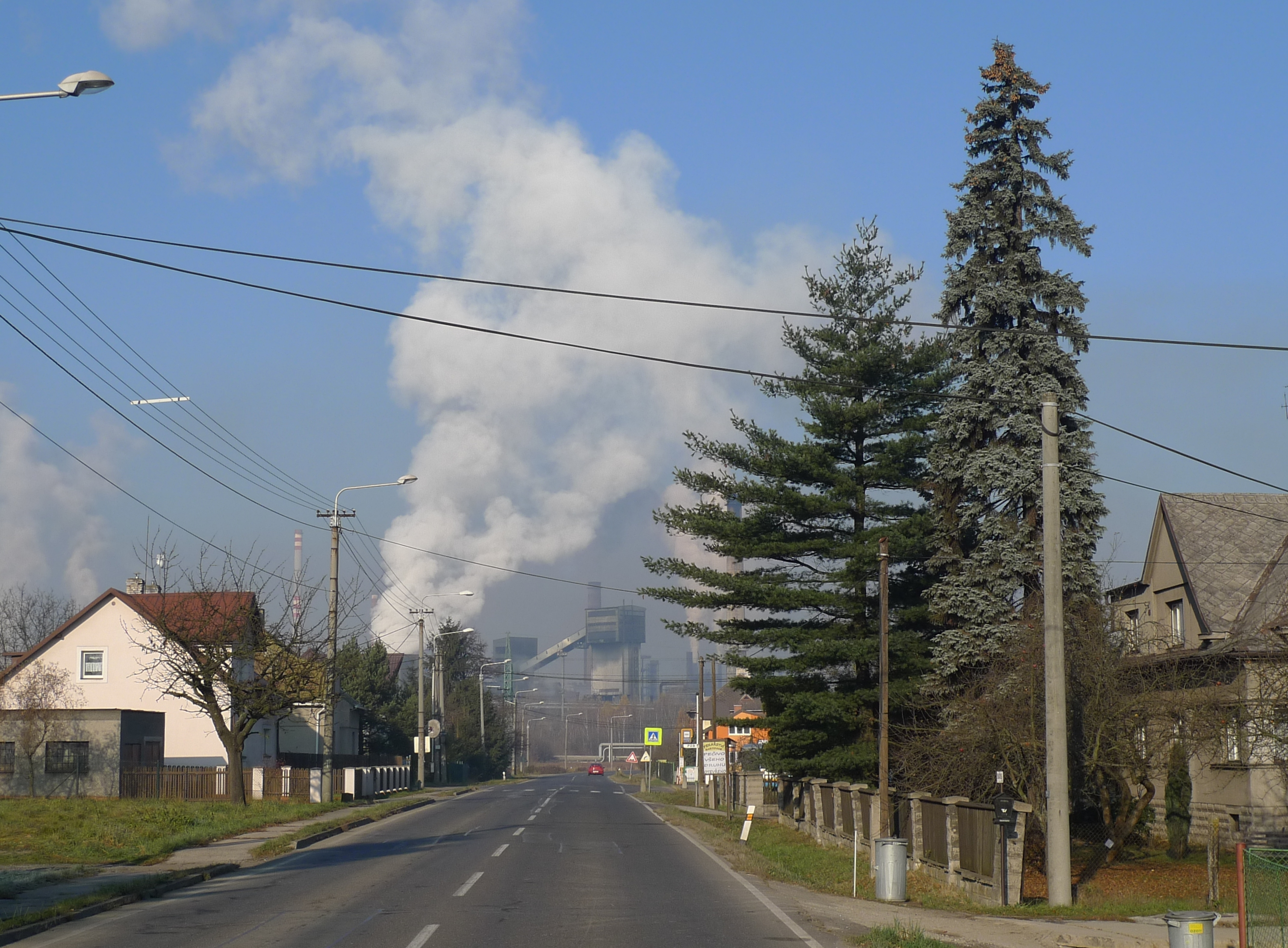
- Šenov Street with Nová huť steel mill in the background

- Location in the Czech Republic
- Coordinates: 49°47′51″N 18°21′24″E
- Country: Czech Republic
- Region: Moravian-Silesian
- District: Ostrava-City
- Municipality: Ostrava
- First mentioned: 1305

Population (2021)
  - Total: 2,007
- Time zone: UTC+1 (CET)
  - Summer (DST): UTC+2 (CEST)
- Postal code: 716 00

Bartovice (Polish: Bartowice, German: Bartelsdorf) is a part of the city of Ostrava, Moravian-Silesian Region in the Czech Republic. Administratively it is a part of the district of Radvanice a Bartovice. Bartovice was formerly an independent municipality, in 1960 it became a part of Ostrava.

== History ==
The village was first mentioned in a Latin document of Diocese of Wrocław called Liber fundationis episcopatus Vratislaviensis from around 1305 as item in Bertoltowitz. It meant that the village was in the process of location (the size of land to pay tithe from was not yet precised). The creation of the village was a part of a larger settlement campaign taking place in the late 13th century on the territory of what will be later known as Upper Silesia.

Politically the village belonged initially to the Duchy of Teschen, formed in 1290 in the process of feudal fragmentation of Poland and was ruled by a local branch of Piast dynasty. In 1327 the duchy became a fee of Kingdom of Bohemia, which after 1526 became part of the Habsburg monarchy.

It was influenced by heavy industrialization which occurred in Ostrava at the end of the 19th century.

According to the Austrian census of 1910 the village had 2,062 inhabitants, 2,061 of whom had permanent residence there. Census asked people for their native language, 2,018 (98%) were Czech-speaking and 39 (1.9%) were Polish-speaking. Most populous religious groups were Roman Catholics with 1,936 (93.9%) and Protestants with 117 (5.7%).
