= Ráj =

- Municipal part of Karviná
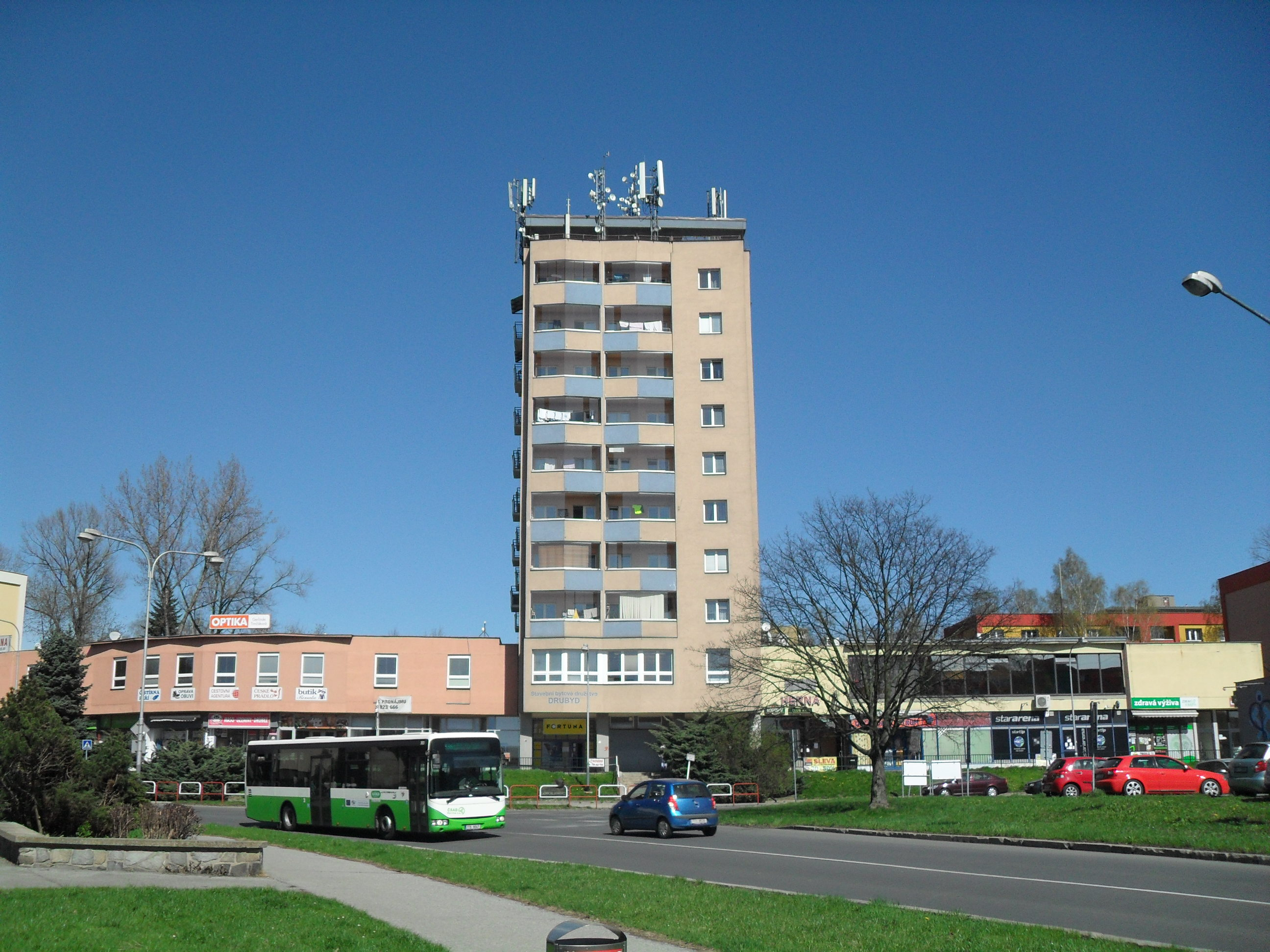
- Interactive map of Ráj
- Coordinates: 49°51′04″N 18°33′50″E
- Country: Czech Republic
- Region: Moravian-Silesian
- District: Karviná
- Municipality: Karviná

Area
  - Total: 7.63 km^{2} (2.95 sq mi)

Population (2021)
  - Total: 14,453
  - Density: 1,890/km^{2} (4,910/sq mi)
- Time zone: UTC+1 (CET)
  - Summer (DST): UTC+2 (CEST)
- Postal code: 734 01

Ráj (Polish: Raj, German: Roj) is a municipal part of the city of Karviná in Karviná District, Moravian-Silesian Region, Czech Republic. It was a separate municipality but in 1948 became a part of Karviná. It lies in the historical region of Cieszyn Silesia and has about 14,000 inhabitants.

The hospital is located there, as well as the football field, home of the local team MFK Karviná.

== Etymology ==
The name is cultural in origin, literally paradise, fertile and beautiful land.

== History ==
The settlement was first mentioned in a Latin document of Diocese of Wrocław called Liber fundationis episcopatus Vratislaviensis from around 1305 as item Frienstad in Ray. It meant that the village served as the foundation ground for Fryštát (Frienstad), and as such it had to be much older.

Politically the village belonged initially to the Duchy of Teschen, formed in 1290 in the process of feudal fragmentation of Poland and was ruled by a local branch of Silesian Piast dynasty. In 1327 the duchy became a fee of the Kingdom of Bohemia, which after 1526 became a part of the Habsburg monarchy.

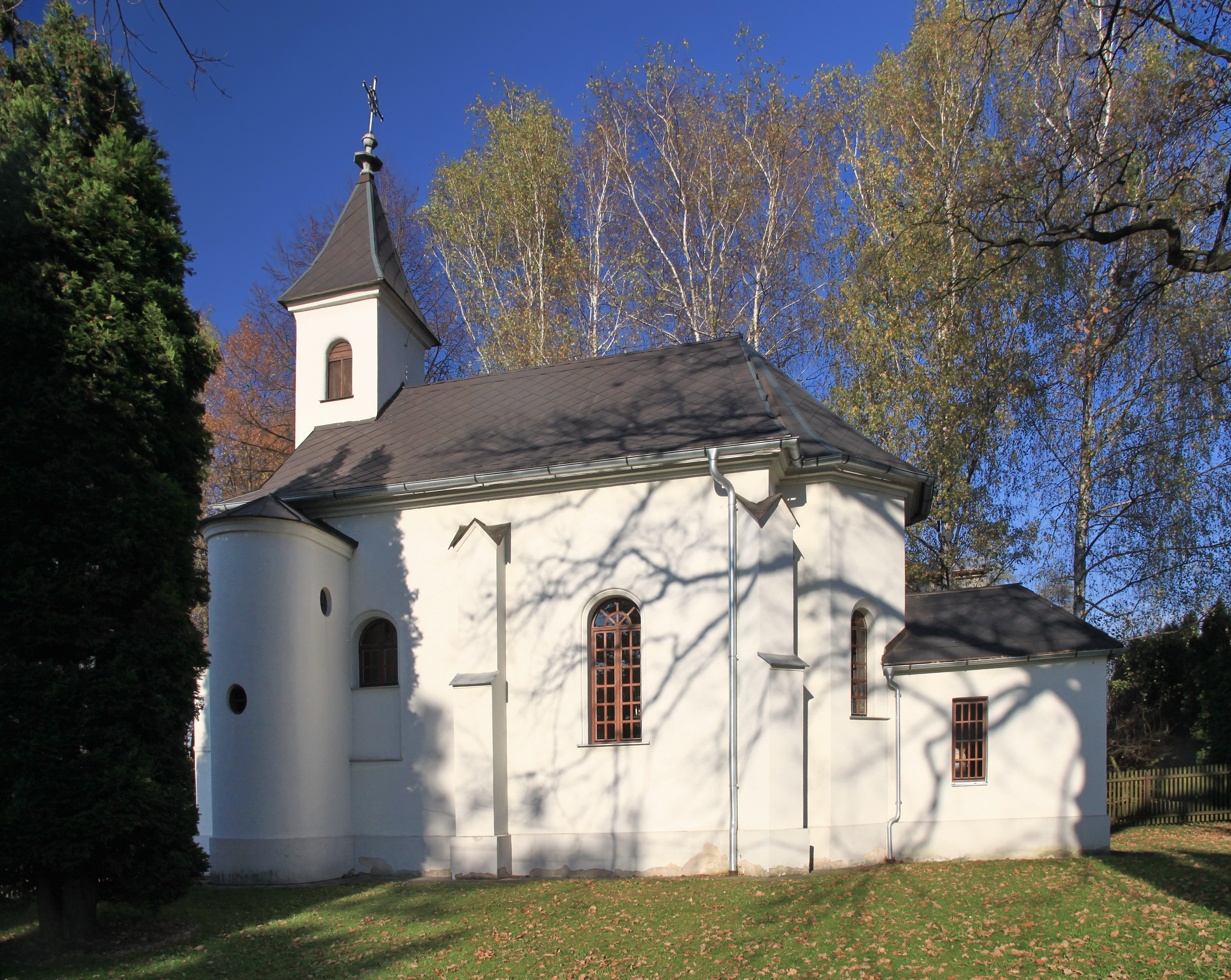
Saint Anne chapel

After the Revolutions of 1848 in the Austrian Empire, a modern municipal division was introduced in the re-established Austrian Silesia. The village as a municipality was subscribed to political district and legal district of Freistadt.

After World War I, the fall of Austria-Hungary, the Polish–Czechoslovak War and the division of Cieszyn Silesia in 1920, the village became a part of Czechoslovakia. Following the Munich Agreement, in October 1938 together with the Zaolzie region it was annexed by Poland, administratively organised in Frysztat County of Silesian Voivodeship. The village was then annexed by Nazi Germany at the beginning of World War II. After the war it was restored to Czechoslovakia.

In the past a Renaissance château was located in Ráj. It was built in 1563-1570 together with the surrounding park. In the 1750s the château was reconstructed to the Baroque style and remained so until its destruction. In 1899 the château was bought by the local wealthy Larisch-Mönnich family, who owned it until 1945. After World War II it was confiscated, and after Communist takeover of power in Czechoslovakia it passed to the coal company, who used it as the dormitory for miners. In 1955 a hospital was relocated there. The château dilapidated quickly and the hospital was forced to leave the building in 1968. Communist authorities neglected the landmark and finally it was demolished in 1980.

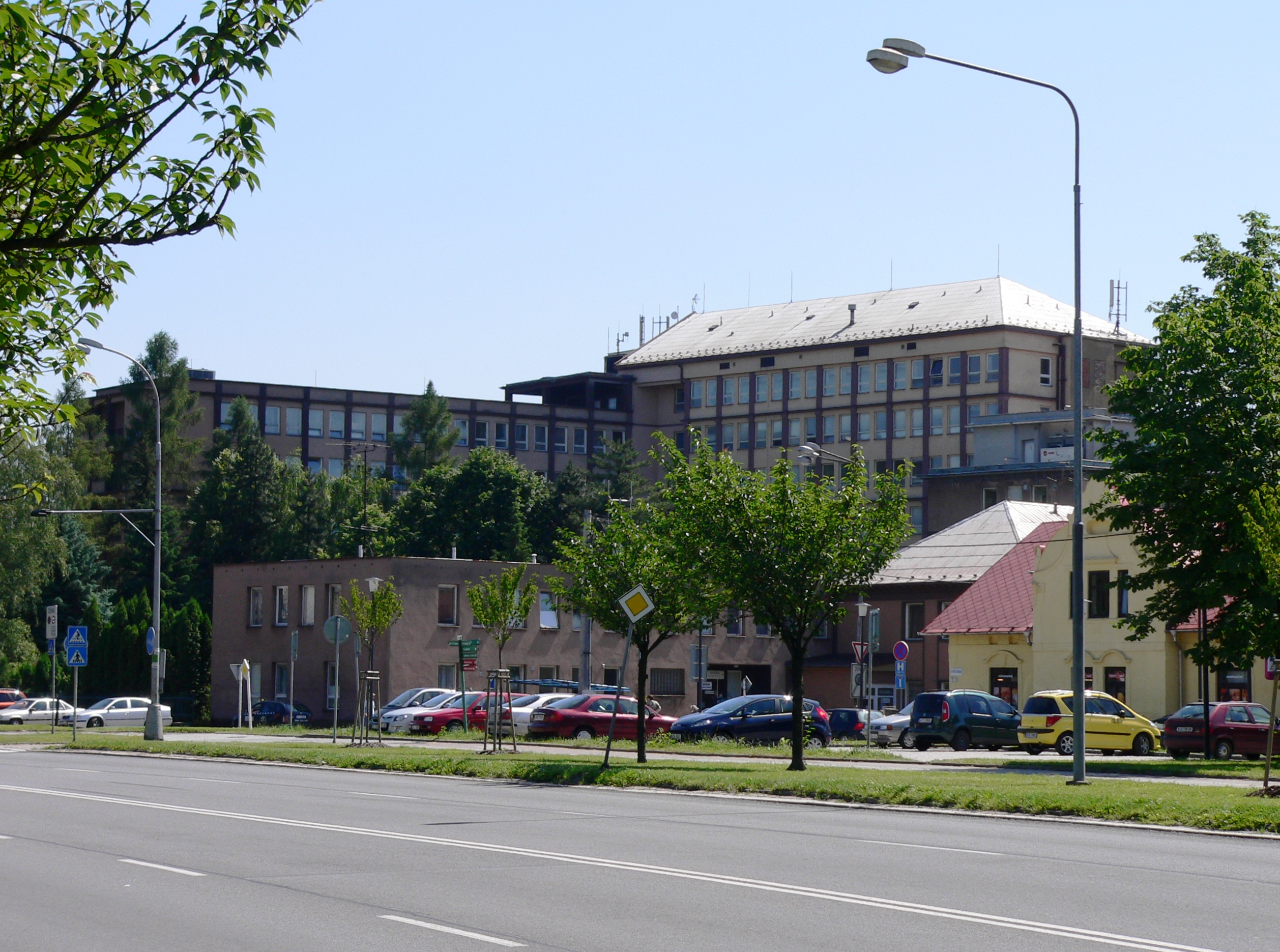
Hospital

== Demographics ==
According to the censuses conducted in 1880, 1890, 1900 and 1910 the population of the municipality grew from 766 in 1880 to 1,053 in 1910. In terms of the language spoken colloquially the majority were Polish-speakers (between 99.4% and 98.4%), accompanied by German-speakers (at most 40 or 5.2% in 1880) and Czech-speakers (at most 5 or 0.5% in 1910). In terms of religion, in 1910 the majority were Roman Catholics (98.7%), followed by Protestants (14 or 1.3%). The village was also traditionally inhabited by Silesian Lachs, speaking Cieszyn Silesian dialect.

Historical population

Year	Pop.	±%
1869	622	—
1880	766	+23.2%
1890	865	+12.9%
1900	838	−3.1%
1910	1,053	+25.7%

Year	Pop.	±%
1921	1,276	+21.2%
1930	1,486	+16.5%
1950	1,685	+13.4%
1961	1,347	−20.1%
1970	19,717	+1363.8%

Year	Pop.	±%
1980	21,231	+7.7%
1991	18,817	−11.4%
2001	17,142	−8.9%
2011	16,088	−6.1%
2021	14,453	−10.2%

Source: Censuses
