= Wilhelm Przeczek =

Polish teacher, poet, writer, and activist

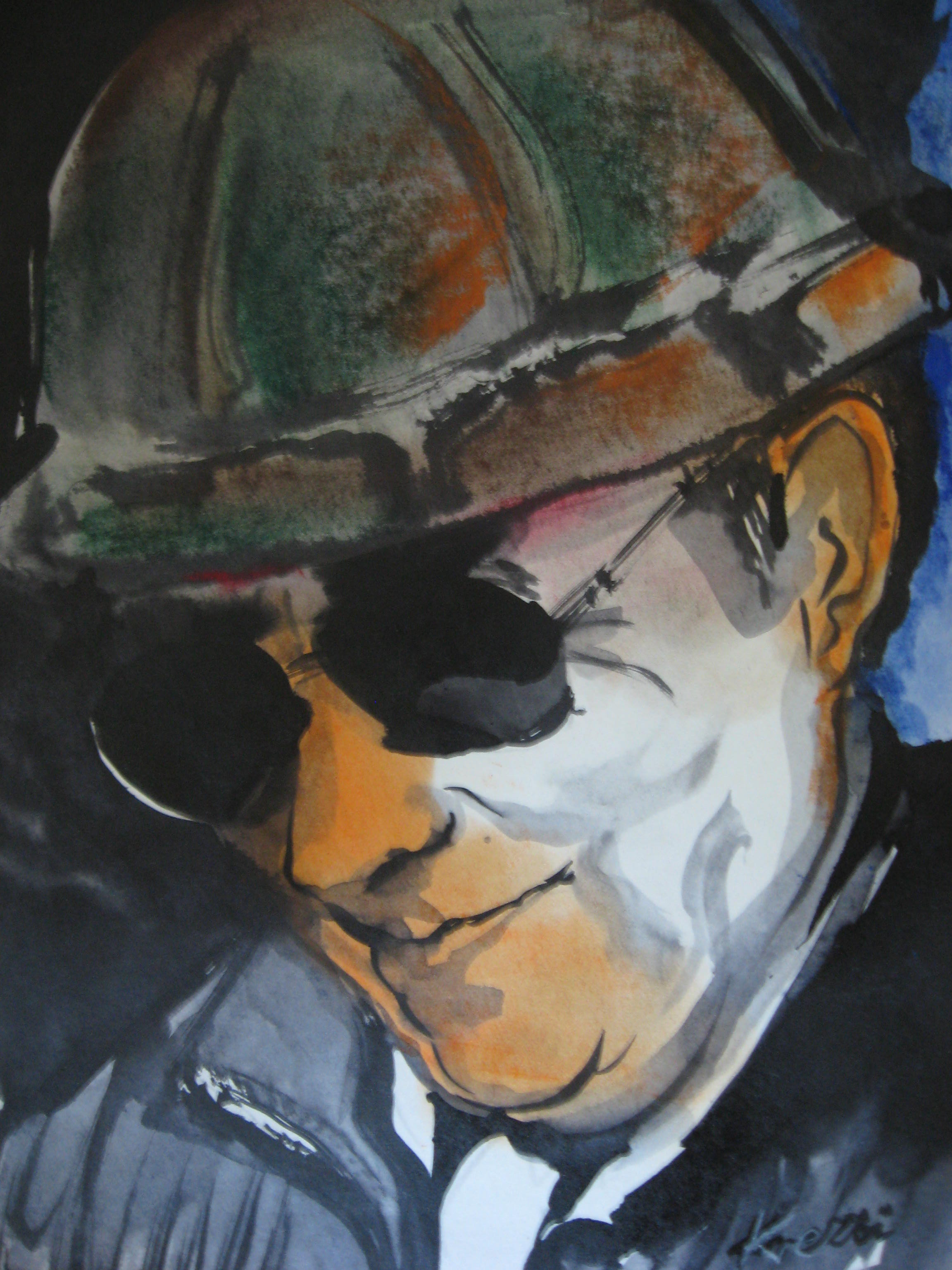
- Przeczek painted by Zbigniew Kresowaty
- Born: 7 April 1936; Karviná, Czechoslovakia
- Died: 10 July 2006 (aged 70); Třinec, Czech Republic
- Occupations: Poet, writer, translator
- Writing career
- Language: Polish, Czech

Wilhelm Przeczek (7 April 1936 – 10 July 2006) was a Polish teacher, poet, writer, and activist. He is considered one of the most important Polish writers of his generation from the region of Trans-Olza.

== Biography ==
Przeczek was born on 7 April 1936 in Karviná, to a coal miner's family. He studied at a teachers' seminary in Orlová and then at a college in Prague. He worked as a teacher in Polish schools in Trans-Olza, e.g. in Jablunkov. Przeczek was later briefly a journalist for the Głos Ludu newspaper. He was also an activist within the PZKO (Polish Cultural and Educational Union) and member of many Polish literary organizations. Przeczek also translated Czech, Slovak and Sorbian poetry to Polish and Polish poetry into Czech.

During the Prague Spring of 1968, Przeczek supported the reformist wing of the Communist Party of Czechoslovakia. His stances led to ban of his works from 1969 to 1989 in Czechoslovakia. His books were therefore published mainly in Poland.

== Works ==
=== Poetry ===
- Czarna calizna (1978)
- Wpisane w Beskid (1980)
- Śmierć pomysłu poetyckiego (1981)
- Szumne podszepty (1982)
- Księga Urodzaju (1986)
- Nauka wierności (1986)
- Tercet (1986)
- Przeczucie kształtu (1989)
- Notatnik liryczny (1990)
- Rękopisy nie płoną (1990)
- Promlčený počet štěstí (1991)
- Dym za paznokciami (1992)
- Na ubitej ziemi (1994)
- Mapa białych plam (1995)
- Małe nocne modlitwy (1996)
- Intimní bedeker (1998)
- Smak wyciszenia (1999)
- Stoletý kalendář (2001)

=== Prose ===
- Skrzyżowanie (1969) (together with Władysław Sikora)
- Břečťan a jiné strašidelné povídky (1992)
- Kazinkowe granie (1994)
- Bienále pivní pěny (1996)
