= Fryštát =

Town in Moravian-Silesian region in Czech Republic

Coordinates: 49°51′15″N 18°32′34″E

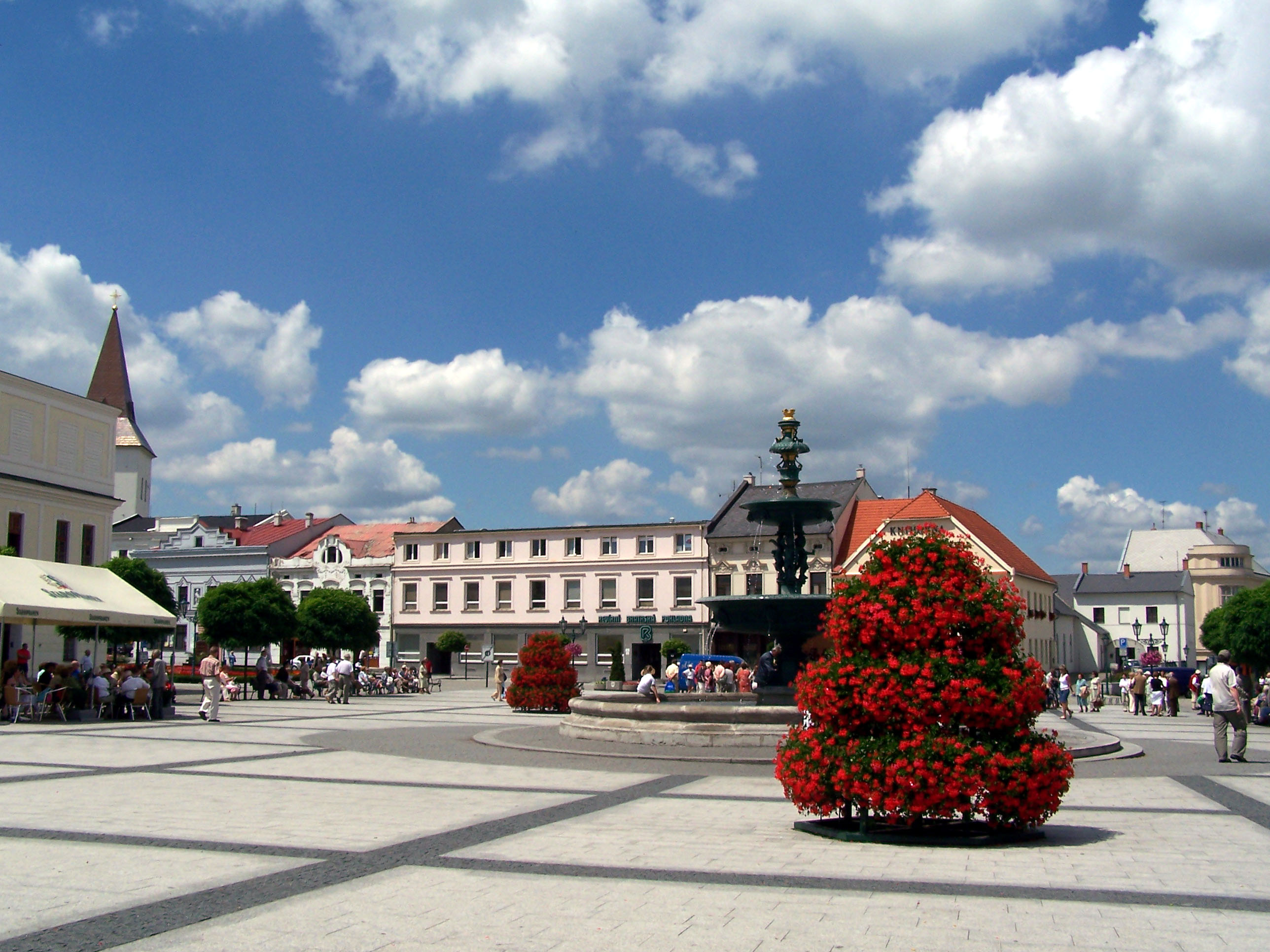
Town square in Fryštát

Fryštát (Czech: [ˈfrɪʃtaːt]; Polish: Frysztat [ˈfrɨʂtat]; German: Freistadt [ˈfʁaɪʃtat]; Cieszyn Silesian: Frysztot) is an administrative part of the city of Karviná in the Moravian-Silesian Region of the Czech Republic. Until 1948 it was a separate town. It lies on the Olza River, in the historical region of Cieszyn Silesia.

== History ==
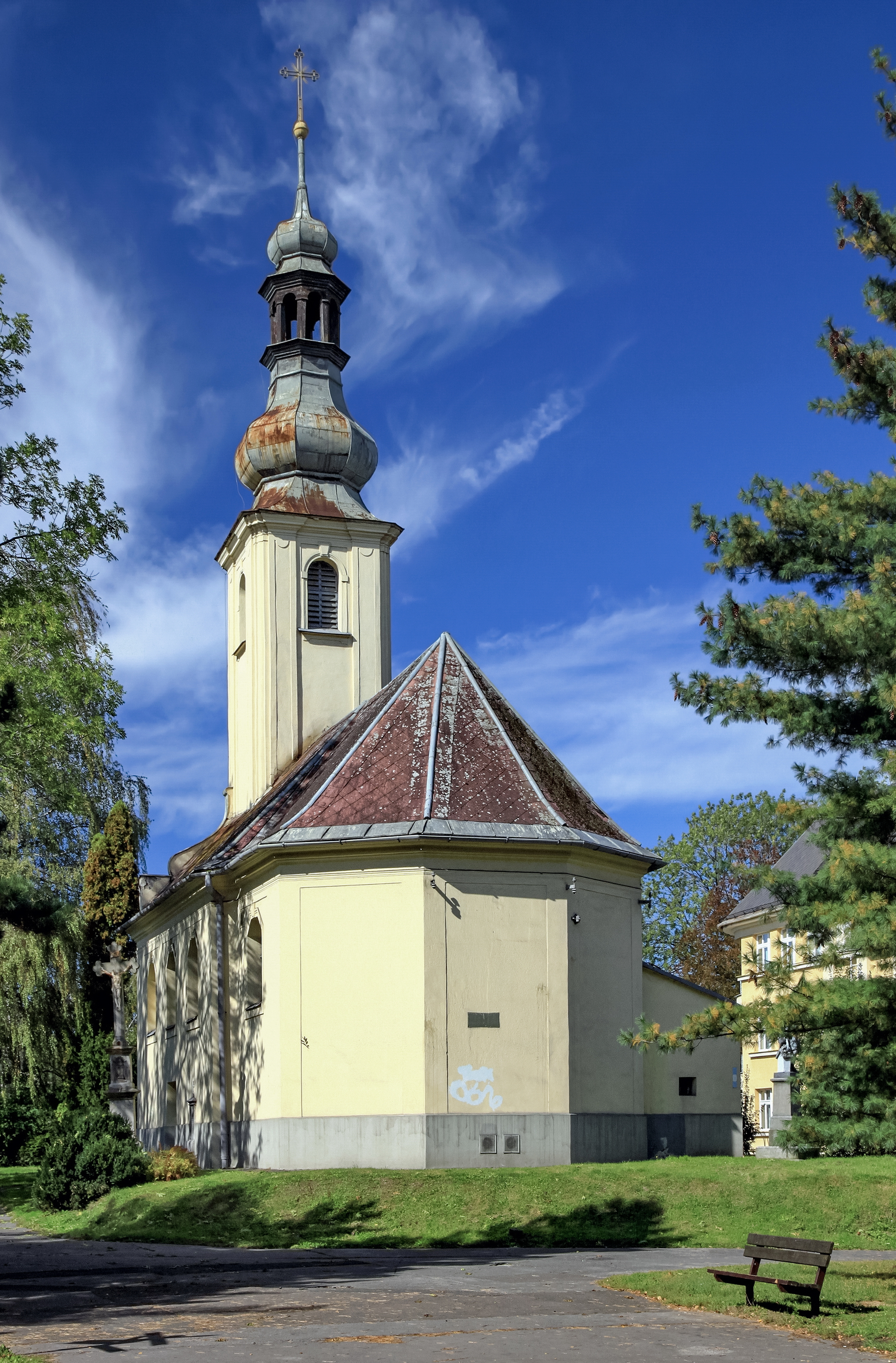
Church of Saint Mark

It was first mentioned in a Latin document of Diocese of Wrocław called Liber fundationis episcopatus Vratislaviensis from around 1305 as Frienstad. It meant that the a new town was being founded on the ground of the older village Ráj (Ray). The creation of the town was a part of a larger settlement campaign taking place in the late 13th century on the territory of what will be later known as Upper Silesia. Politically it belonged initially to the Duchy of Cieszyn, formed in 1290 in the process of feudal fragmentation of Poland and was ruled by a local branch of Piast dynasty until 1653. In the document from 1327 when Duke Casimir I became a vassal of the King of Bohemia it is listed as one of three civitates in the Duchy (the other two being Cieszyn and Bielsko), so it was then a town under German town law.

In the process of location a parish church was also built. It mentioned in the register of Peter's Pence payment from 1447 among 50 parishes of Cieszyn deanery as Freyenstat.

After the 1540s Protestant Reformation prevailed in the Duchy of Teschen (Cieszyn) and a local Catholic church was taken over by Lutherans. It was taken from them (as one from around fifty buildings in the region) by a special commission and given back to the Roman Catholic Church on 14 April 1654.

From its beginning it was one of the most important centers of Cieszyn Silesia. Development of the town was set back by a major fire in 1511 when all of the wooden houses burnt down. Fish farming became an important industry for the town with the creation of several ponds in the 16th century. The 17th century had a mostly negative impact on the town's development with fires, epidemics and the Thirty Years' War. In 1623 about 1,400 citizens died of bubonic plague. The town was occupied for nearly thirty years by Danish forces and then by Swedish forces. The dilapidated town was then bought by owners of nearby Karwin, the Larisch-Mönnich family. They built a château there and raised the town from poverty, but a fire in 1823, Prussian occupation in 1866 and epidemics again made the development of the town difficult. Coal was discovered in 1776, but it was not until 1794 that it began to be exploited on a large scale. As a result of the coal industry, rapid development of the town and surrounding villages occurred. Its impact was both positive and negative. Old settlements were destroyed and landscape was devastated. Industrial and coal mining expansion as well as the construction of railroads led to rapid growth of the area's importance. It became the most industrialized area in Austria and later Czechoslovakia.

After Revolutions of 1848 in the Austrian Empire a modern municipal division was introduced in the re-established Austrian Silesia. The town became seat of a legal district in political district of Teschen, in 1868 it was elevated to become a seat of a separate Freistadt political district. According to the censuses conducted in 1880–1910 the population of the town grew from 2,960 in 1880 to 5,058 in 1910 with a majority being Polish-speakers (at least 53.8% in 1880, at most 76.8% in 1890, then dropping to 59.5% in 1910), accompanied by German-speaking (at least 21.6% in 1890 then growing to 1,704 or 35.3% in 1910) and Czech-speaking minority (at most 546 or 18.8% in 1880, then dropping to 46 or 1.5% in 1890 and growing to 253 or 5.2% in 1910). In terms of religion in 1910 the majority were Roman Catholics (4,437 or 87.8%), followed by Jews (341 or 6.7%), Protestants (267 or 5.3%) and others (13 or 0.2%). In the meantime it nearby Karwin with many coal mines and industrial facilities became more populous.

Until 1918, the town was part of the Austria-Hungary (Austrian portion after the compromise of 1867), in the district of the same name, one of the eight Bezirkshauptmannschaften in Austrian Silesia. In official dealings, only the German name of the town was used before 1867.

After World War I, Polish–Czechoslovak War and the division of Cieszyn Silesia in 1920, the village became a part of Czechoslovakia as the main mining center of the country. Following the Munich Agreement, in October 1938 together with the Trans-Olza region it was annexed by Poland, administratively organised in Frysztat County of Silesian Voivodeship. The village was then annexed by Nazi Germany at the beginning of World War II. During the genocidal Intelligenzaktion campaign, in 1939–1940, several Polish teachers, activist and a Polish priest were deported to concentration camps and then murdered there (see Nazi crimes against the Polish nation). The Germans established and operated two Polenlager forced labour camps for Poles, and a forced labour camp for Jewish women in the town. After the war it was restored to Czechoslovakia. In 1948 it was merged with Karviná and became a part of that city. In the 1960 reform of administrative divisions, the Fryštát District was superseded by the Karviná District. Fryštát forms the historical centre of Karviná, which is otherwise an industrial city.

== People ==
- Alfred Biolek – German television producer
- Henryk Flame – Polish World War II pilot
- Dana Zátopková – Czech athlete

== See also ==
- Polish minority in the Czech Republic
