= Jan Bystroń =

Jan Bystroń may refer to:

- Jan Bystroń (linguist) (1860–1902), Polish linguist
- Jan Stanisław Bystroń (1892–1964), his son, Polish sociologist and ethnographer
