= Životice (Havířov) =

- municipal part of the Czech Republic
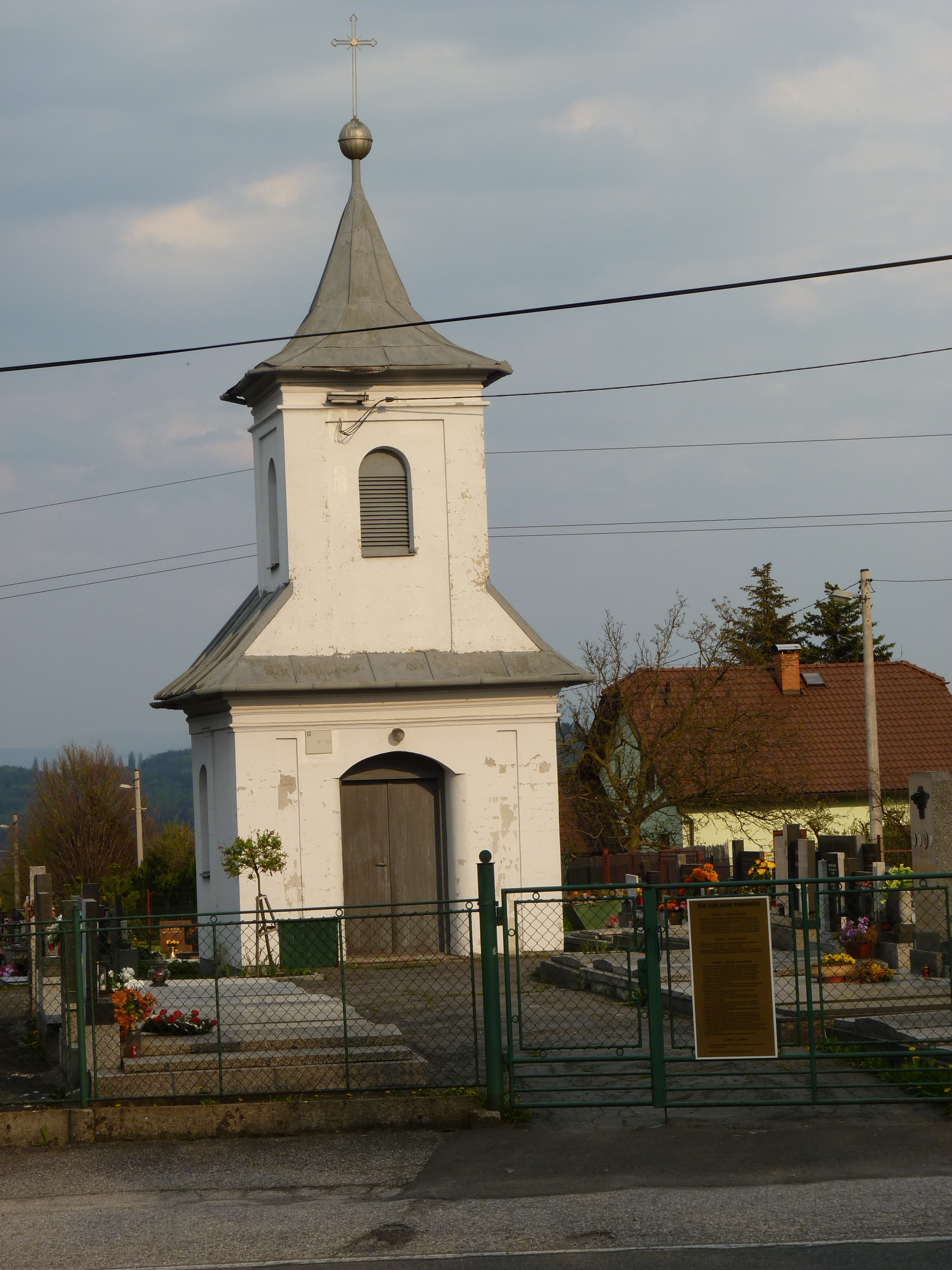

- Coordinates: 49°46′N 18°29′E
- Country: Czech Republic

Area
  - Total: 3.034 km^{2} (1.171 sq mi)

Population (26 March 2021)
  - Total: 1,308
  - Density: 430/km^{2} (1,100/sq mi)

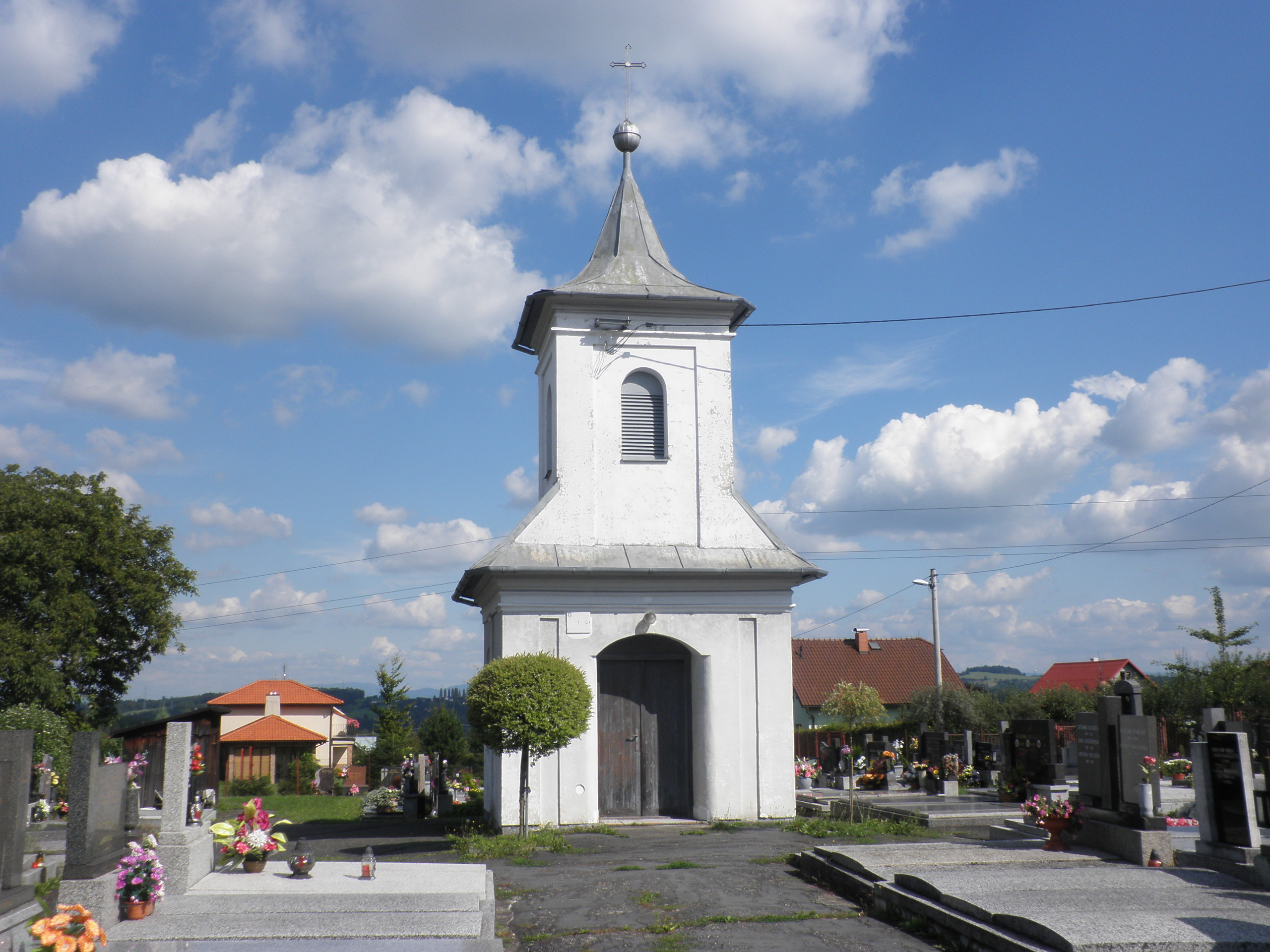
Chapel at the Lutheran cemetery

Životice (Polish: Żywocice, German: Zywotitz, formerly Ziwotitz) is a village in Karviná District, Moravian-Silesian Region, Czech Republic. It was previously a separate municipality, but became administratively part of the city of Havířov in 1960. It has a population of 1,339 (2020). It lies in the historical region of Cieszyn Silesia.

On 6 August 1944, the village was the site of the Żywocice Massacre, the largest mass murder within Cieszyn Silesia during World War II, during which 36 residents of Životice and neighbouring villages were shot dead by the Nazis. Životice was thus nicknamed the "Silesian Lidice".

== Name ==
The name is patronymic in origin, derived from the personal name Żywot.

== History ==
The village's oldest recorded mention in a written document was as Ziboticze in 1450. At that time it belonged to the Duchy of Teschen, a fee of the Kingdom of Bohemia, which became part of the Habsburg monarchy after 1526.

After the Revolutions of 1848 in the Austrian Empire, a modern municipal division was introduced in the re-established Austrian Silesia. The municipality of Životice was allocated to the political and legal district of Cieszyn. According to census data, the population of the municipality dropped from 383 in 1880 to 606 in 1910, with the majority being native Polish-speakers (growing from 97.1% in 1880 to 99.3% in 1910) accompanied by a small number of German speakers (at most 12 or 2.6% in 1900) and Czech speakers (at most 6 or 1.6% in 1880). In terms of religion, in 1910 the majority were Protestants (55.5%), followed by Roman Catholics (43.3%) and Jews (8 or 1.2%). The village was also traditionally inhabited by Silesian Lachs, who spoke in the Cieszyn Silesian dialect.

After World War I, the fall of Austria-Hungary, the Polish–Czechoslovak War and the division of Cieszyn Silesia in 1920, Životice became a part of Czechoslovakia. Following the Munich Agreement in October 1938 it was annexed by Poland, together with the Zaolzie region, and administratively adjoined to Cieszyn County in the Silesian Voivodeship. It was then annexed by Nazi Germany at the beginning of World War II. After the war it was restored to Czechoslovakia.

=== Massacre ===
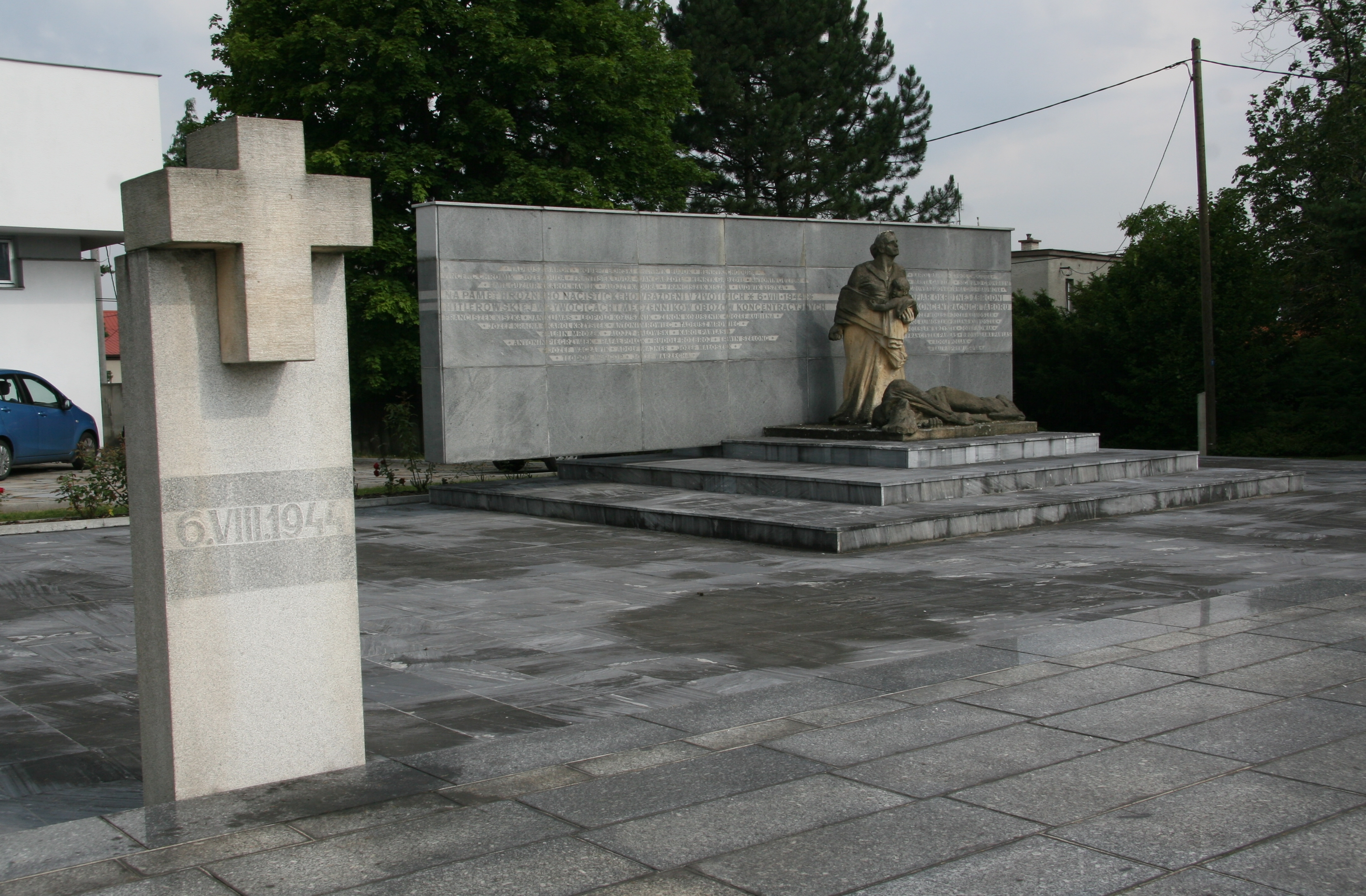
Životice Tragedy memorial

On 6 August 1944, the village was the site of the Żywocice Massacre, the largest mass murder within Cieszyn Silesia during World War II, during which 36 residents of Životice and neighbouring villages were shot dead by the Nazis. Životice was thus nicknamed the "Silesian Lidice". This massacre is also known as the Żywocice Tragedy (Tragedia Żywocicka in Polish or Životická tragédie in Czech).

From 4–5 August, members of a local Polish resistance unit of Armia Krajowa, under the command of J. Kamiński, killed two officers of the Gestapo command of Teschen and mortally wounded the driver. The innkeeper and a resistance fighter were also killed. As the Gestapo were unable to apprehend the guerrillas, they decided to retaliate against the villagers.

In the early hours of Sunday 6 August, Životice was surrounded by the German Army and the Landwache. Those who refused to register as ethnic Germans on the "Volksliste" (the German ethnic register) were targeted, having already been identified through documentation. Landwache and Gestapo officers from Teschen and Kattowitz combed the village, dragged residents out of their houses, and shot them nearby. Some villagers were killed while attempting to escape, and others were murdered while passing through the village, mostly coal miners returning from their night shifts who failed to produce Volksliste documents. The massacre was directed by Q. Magwitz, the commander of the Gestapo's Teschen headquarters, and targeted civilians who were not involved in the resistance. Neither Magwitz nor any other perpetrator was tried or punished.

In total, 36 people were killed, including 27 ethnic Poles, eight Czechs, and one registered as "Volksdeutscher" class three. 24 of the victims were residents of Životice, six from Horní Suchá, four from Dolní Bludovice, and one each from Dolní Suchá, Dolní Těrlicko and Šenov. The youngest victim was 16, the oldest 60. After the massacre, the corpses were loaded onto trucks and carried to the old Jewish cemetery in Orlová, where they were dumped in a common grave. The German authorities then recorded "cardiac insufficiency" and "cardiac infarct" as their causes of death in the death register. The bodies were transferred from Orlová to Životice after the war. On 25 September 1949, a memorial by Franciszek Świder, a Karviná-based Polish sculptor, was unveiled to commemorate the victims of the massacre and all victims of German occupation. In 1984, a new building was opened next to the memorial to accommodate the exhibition: 'Occupation and Resistance Movement in Cieszyn Silesia 1938-1944'.

== See also ==
- Polish minority in the Czech Republic
- Zaolzie
