= Josef Hrejsemnou =

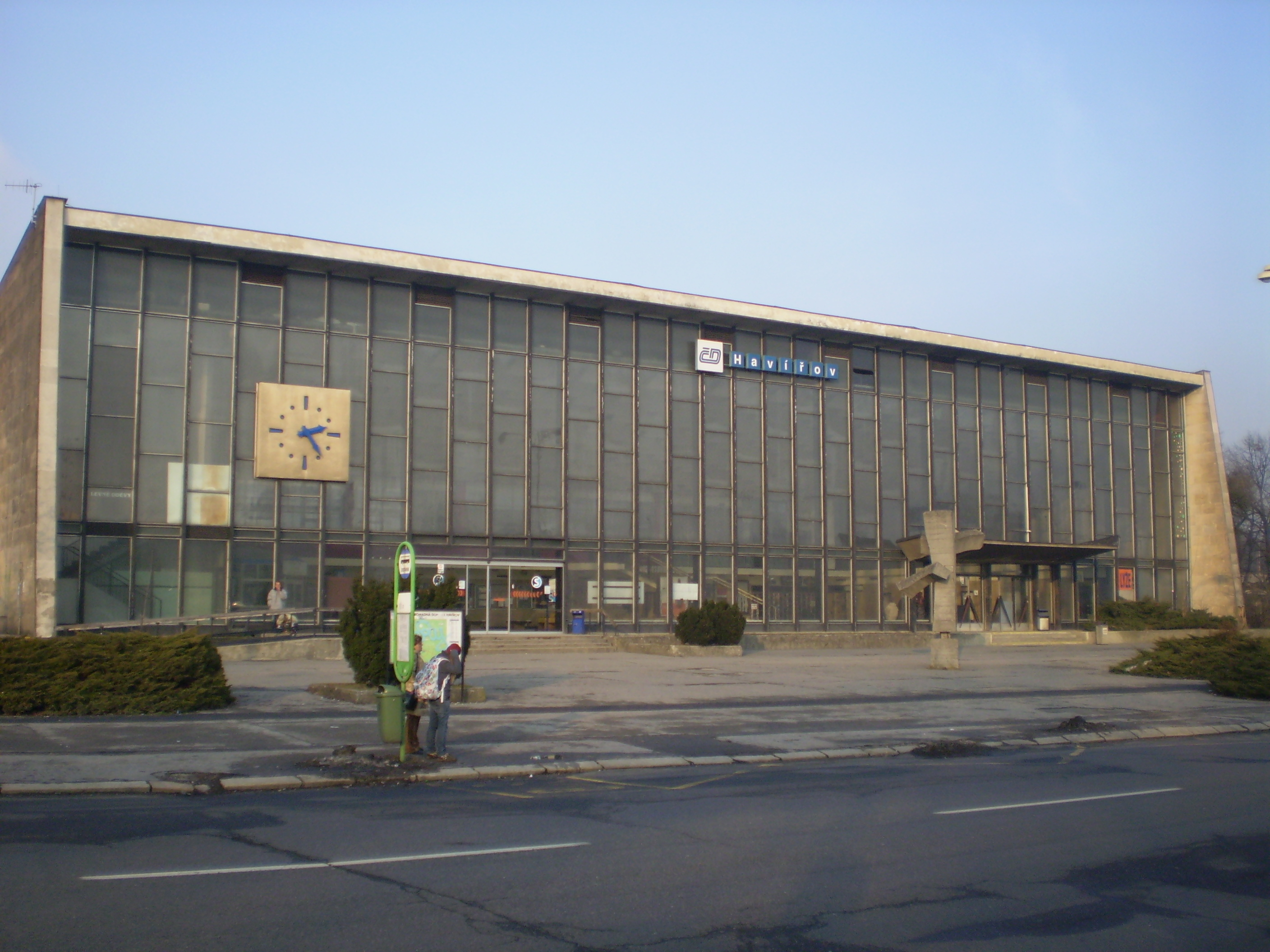
Havířov train station designed by Josef Hrejsemnou, an example of the so-called Brussels style

Josef Hrejsemnou (28 May 1928 – 1 March 2010) was a Czech architect.

== Life ==
Josef Hrejsemnou was born in 1928 in Zlín, Czechoslovakia. From 1951 to 1957 he studied in Saint Petersburg, where his tutor was the Soviet architect Igor Fomin, son of the famous Russian architect Ivan Fomin. In the Soviet Union he witnessed the changes in Soviet architecture as it moved from Stalinist Socialist realism and began to accept new artistic movements from the Western countries. Hrejsemnou was also inspired by pre-war avant-garde architecture, and probably also by the pre-war architecture of his hometown, Zlín.

He returned to Czechoslovakia in 1957. His best-known work is the train station building in Havířov, built in 1965–1969. He died in Havířov in 2010.
