= Prostřední Suchá =

Coordinates: 49°47′36″N 18°27′08″E

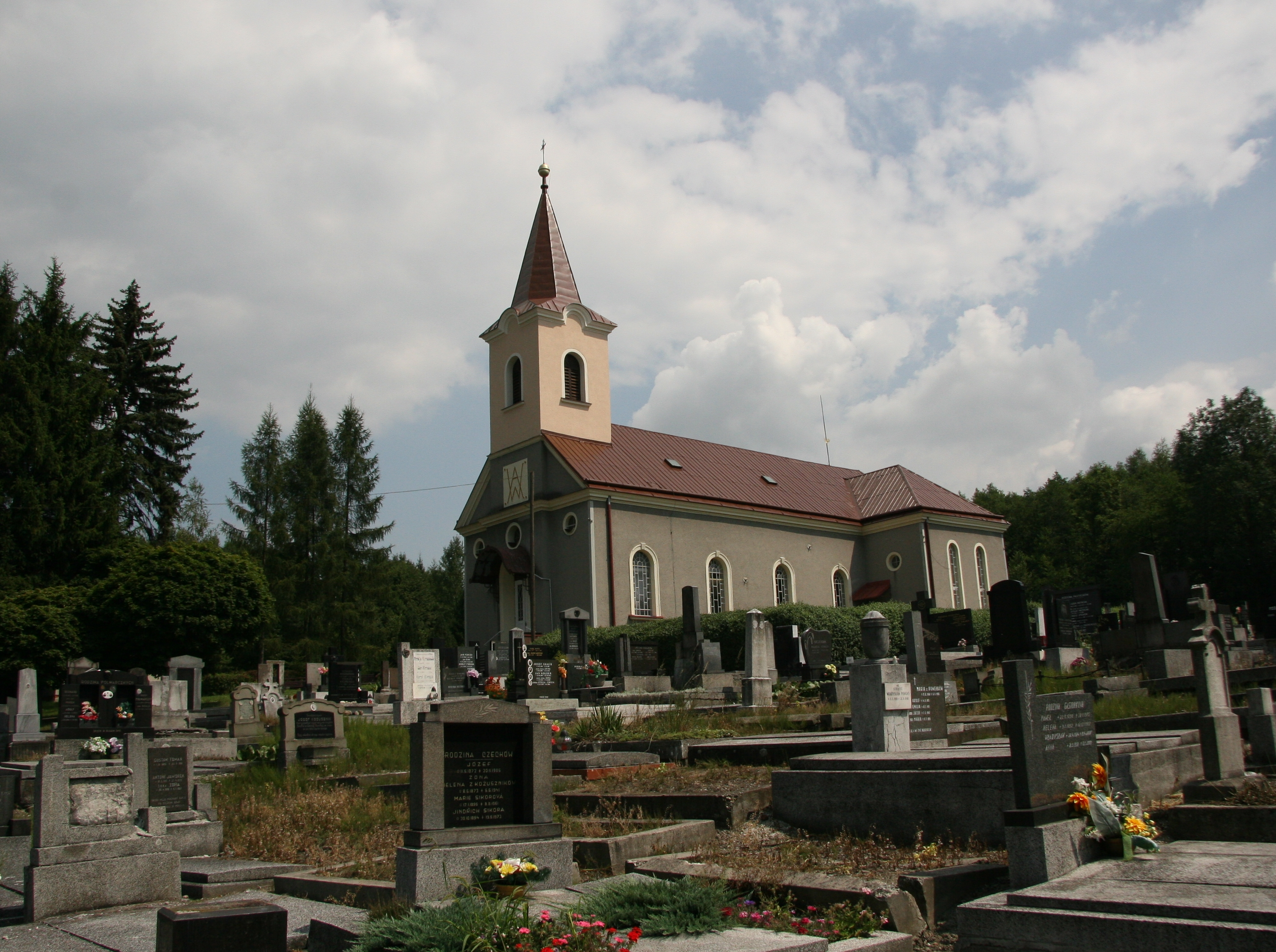
Lutheran church

Prostřední Suchá (Polish: Sucha Średnia, German: Mittel Suchau) is a village in Karviná District, Moravian-Silesian Region, Czech Republic. It was a separate municipality but became administratively a part of Havířov in 1960. It has a population of 4,595 (2020). The village lies in the historical region of Cieszyn Silesia.

The name is of topographic origin, supposedly derived from an older name of a hypothetical river or stream Sucha, literally dry, therefore disappearing. The supplementary adjective Prostřední (German: Mittel, Polish: Średnia) means middle denoting its middle location in comparison to sister settlements: Dolní Suchá (Lower) and Horní Suchá (Upper).

== History ==
The village evolved in between the sister settlements of Dolní Suchá and Horní Suchá. In 1725 a local manor is mentioned as Statek w Postrzedni Suchey leżyczy.

After the Revolutions of 1848 in the Austrian Empire, a modern municipal division was introduced in the re-established Austrian Silesia. The village as a municipality was subscribed at least since 1880 to political district and legal district of Freistadt.

According to the censuses conducted in 1880, 1890, 1900 and 1910 the population of the municipality grew from 860 in 1880 to 3,052 in 1910. In terms of the dominant language spoken colloquially the majority were Polish-speakers (dropping from 67.8% in 1880 to 55.3% in 1910), followed by Czech-speakers (growing from 32.1% in 1880 to 42.8% in 1910), accompanied by German-speakers (at most 55 or 1.8% in 1910) and in 1910 by 3 others. In terms of religion, in 1910 the majority were Roman Catholics (61.4%), followed by Protestants (37.6%), Jews (19 or 0.6%) and 16 others. The village was also traditionally inhabited by Silesian Lachs, speaking Cieszyn Silesian dialect, additionally industrial growth lured a large influx of migrant workers, mostly from western Galicia.

After World War I, fall of Austria-Hungary, Polish–Czechoslovak War and the division of Cieszyn Silesia in 1920, the village became a part of Czechoslovakia. Following the Munich Agreement, in October 1938 together with the Zaolzie region it was annexed by Poland, administratively organised in Frysztat County of Silesian Voivodeship. The village was then annexed by Nazi Germany at the beginning of World War II. After the war it was restored to Czechoslovakia.

== See also ==
- Polish minority in the Czech Republic
