= Dukla coal mine =

Closed coal mine in the Czech Republic

Dukla
- Interactive map of Dukla
- Location: Czech Republic; 49°48′38.8″N 18°26′30.8″E
- Products: Coal
- Opened: 1907
- Closed: 2007

Dukla mine (Czech: Důl Dukla) is a closed coal mine located in Dolní Suchá near the city of Havířov in the Czech Republic. A disaster occurred there in 1961, now depicted in film Dukla 61.

== History ==
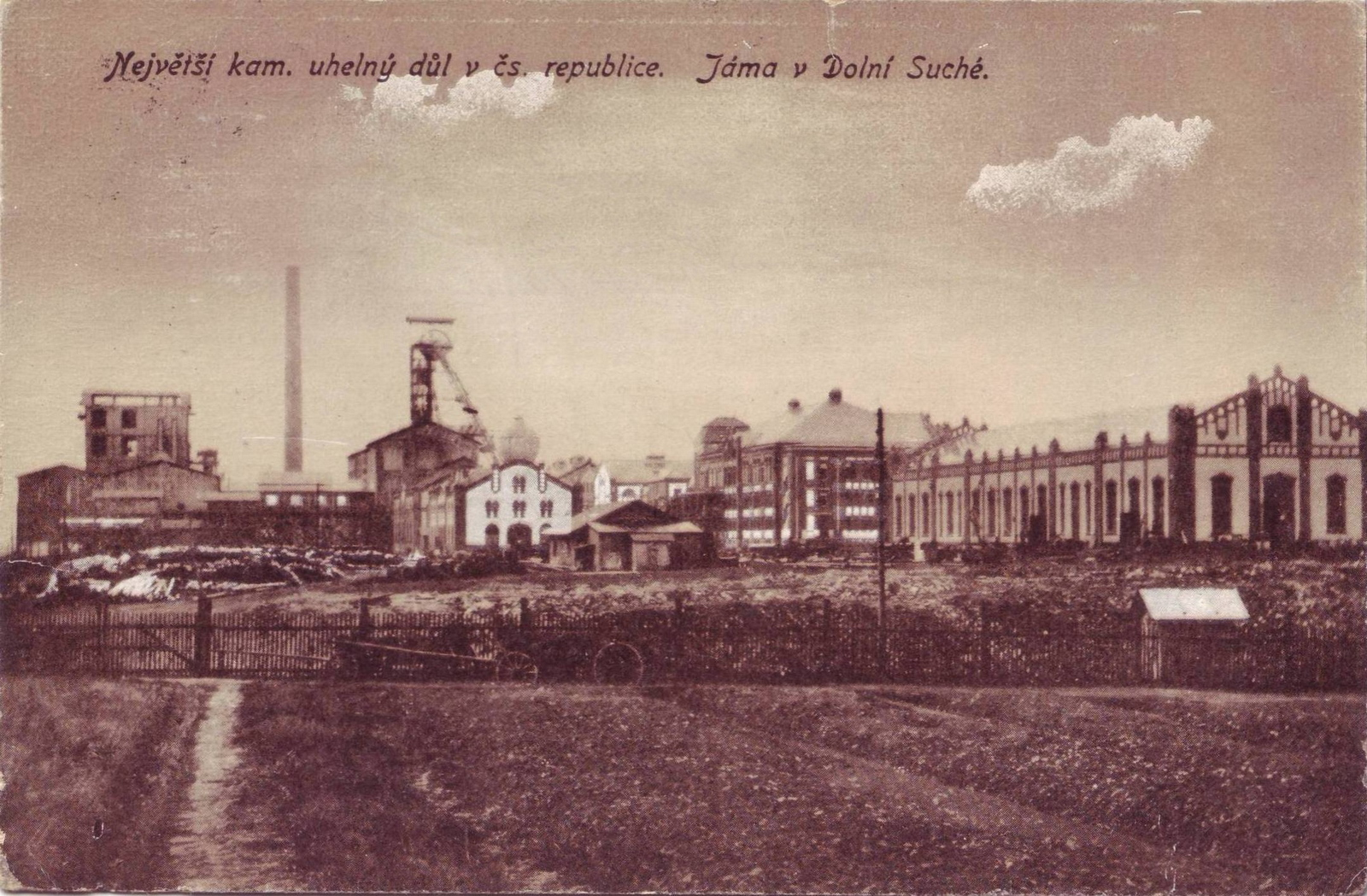
Mine photograph as of 1924 (when the name was mine Sucha)

It was founded in 1907. The Dukla name was used since 1947. After 1947, it was part OKD which is the abbreviation for Ostrava-Karviná Mines. Previous names were Kaiser Franz-Josef Mine, and Sucha Mine. The top coal production was achieved in 1971 (2041 thousand tons). On 1 July 1995 the mine merged with another local Lazy Mine (together with another nearby František Mine). In 2006, it further merged again with Mine Paskov. Shortly after the 2006 merger, it was decided the mine will be shut down. The last mining day was 10 January 2007.

== 1961 tragedy ==
On 7 July 1961 a tragedy occurred that resulted in the death of 108 miners. The youngest miner was not even 17 years old, the oldest was 56 years old. The tragedy involved a fire. It was triggered by a miner who accidentally started a conveyor belt and did not notice it. This happened in the part of the mine where that day was no current mining. The conveyor belt was working idle and eventually thanks to friction the rubber band of it caught fire. When the fire started, there were 338 miners. The fire started during morning shift but was unnoticed. The morning shift ended and new miners from afternoon shift went into the mine. Only around 17:00 the fire was fully detected and dealt with by the mine supervisor. The supervisor did not react to one earlier report about suspicious smell. The fire spread and became extensive. It trapped 108 miners in the section 8 of the mine. The miners suffocated. The only way to stop the fire was to seal the section from oxygen (around midnight). The chance of surviving in the sealed section was zero at the time of the seal. A total of 750 rescue workers assisted in the rescue operation.

After the tragedy, all local mines switched to fire-proof belts in conveyors (in addition to other changes made).
