= Dolní Datyně =

Coordinates: 49°46′0″N 18°24′22″E

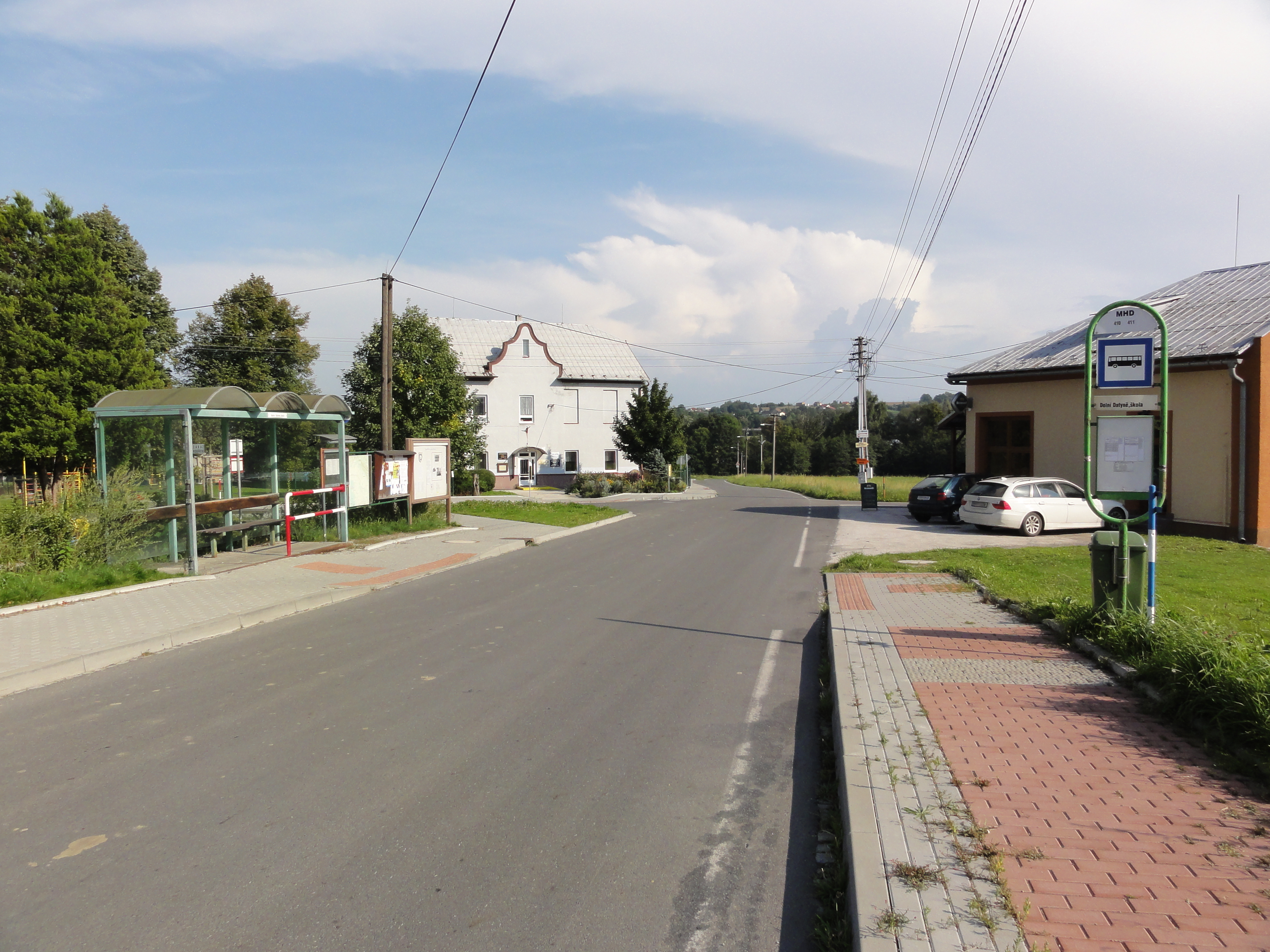
Centre of Dolní Datyně

Dolní Datyně (Polish: Datynie Dolne, German: Nieder Dattin) is a village in Karviná District, Moravian-Silesian Region, Czech Republic. It was a separate municipality but became administratively a part of the city of Havířov in 1974. It had a population of 576 in 2020. The village lies in the historical region of Cieszyn Silesia.

At 218 hectares in area it is one of the smallest villages in Zaolzie, and it is one of the youngest villages in the whole of Cieszyn Silesia.

== History ==
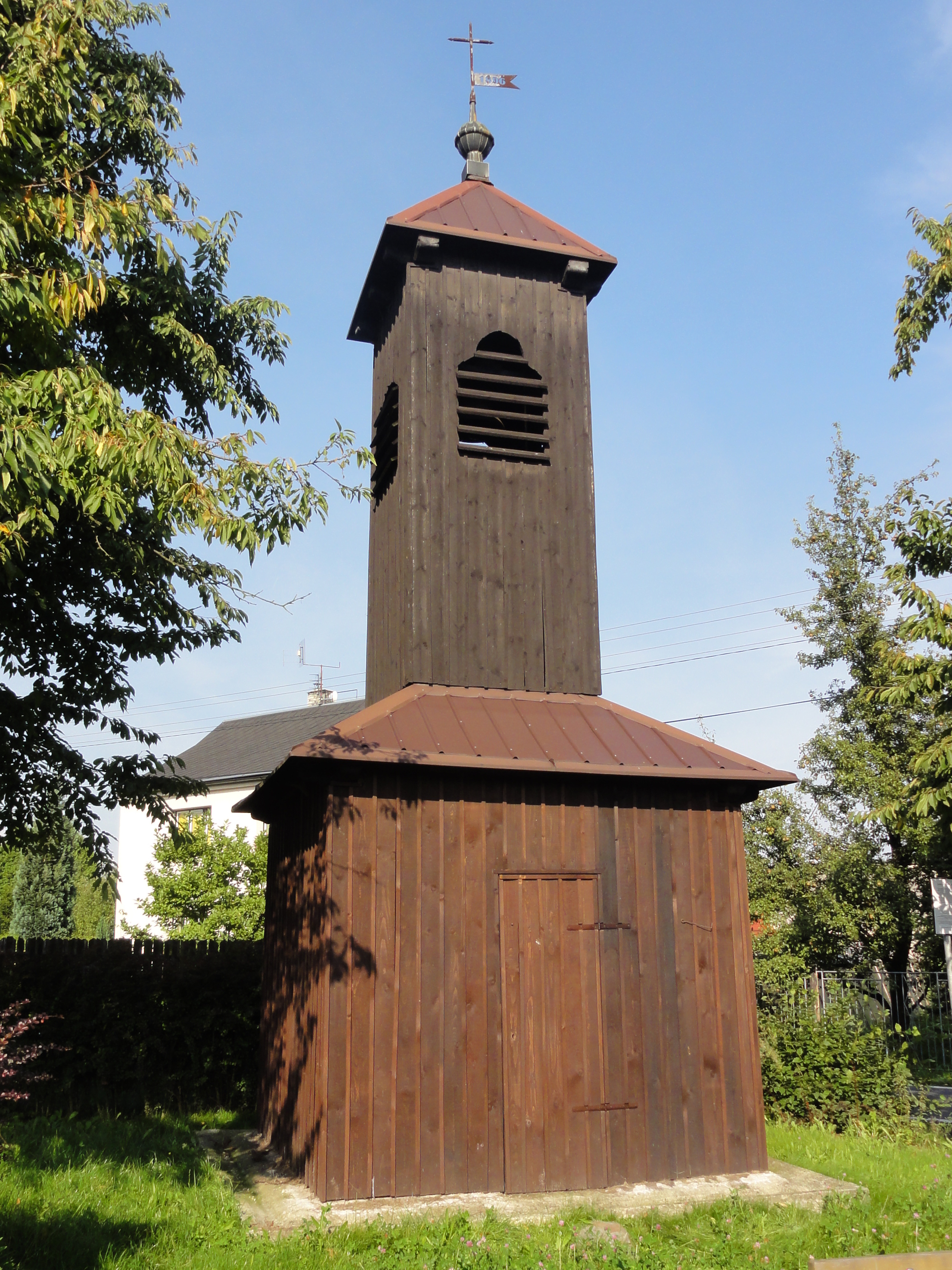
Wooden bell tower from 1896

The settlement of Datyně was first mentioned in 1577 as z Datynie. It belonged then to the Duchy of Teschen, a fee of the Kingdom of Bohemia and a part of the Habsburg monarchy. Later two separate settlements were differentiated: Dolní and Horní Datyně.

After Revolutions of 1848 in the Austrian Empire a modern municipal division was introduced in the re-established Austrian Silesia. The village became a part of the municipality of Dolní Bludovice but gained independent status in June 1864. It was the subscribed to the political and legal district of Cieszyn. According to the censuses conducted in 1880, 1890, 1900 and 1910 the population of the municipality grew from 462 in 1880 to 586 in 1910. In 1880 80.7% of the population declared speaking Czech-language at home and the rest (19.3%) Polish language. In the three next censuses the majority were Polish-speakers (between 93.3% and 96.9%) followed by Czech-speaking minority (between 3.1% and 6.3%). In terms of religion in 1910 majority were Protestants (85.7%), followed by Roman Catholics (14.3%). The village was also traditionally inhabited by Silesian Lachs, speaking Cieszyn Silesian dialect.

After World War I, fall of Austria-Hungary, Polish–Czechoslovak War and the division of Cieszyn Silesia in 1920, it became a part of Czechoslovakia. Following the Munich Agreement, in October 1938 together with the Zaolzie region it was annexed by Poland, administratively adjoined to Cieszyn County of Silesian Voivodeship. It was then annexed by Nazi Germany at the beginning of World War II. After the war it was restored to Czechoslovakia.

The first school, which conducted classes in both Polish and German, was built in the 19th century; it is not clear in what year it was completed. In 1879 a brick Polish school was built, and in 1920, a Czech school. The Polish school was closed several years after World War II due to lack of children. Its building now houses a Czech school.

== Landmarks ==
The most notable landmark in the village is the Protestant chapel, built in 1886 by Józef Prymus and Jan Kołorz.

== People ==
Notable people associated with the village include Józef Kiedroń, Polish politician; Josef Kotas, Mayor of Ostrava; Franciszek Czyż, Polish politician; and Jan Bystroń, Polish linguist.

== See also ==
- Polish minority in the Czech Republic
