= Havířov railway station =

Railway station in Havířov, Czech Republic

Havířov
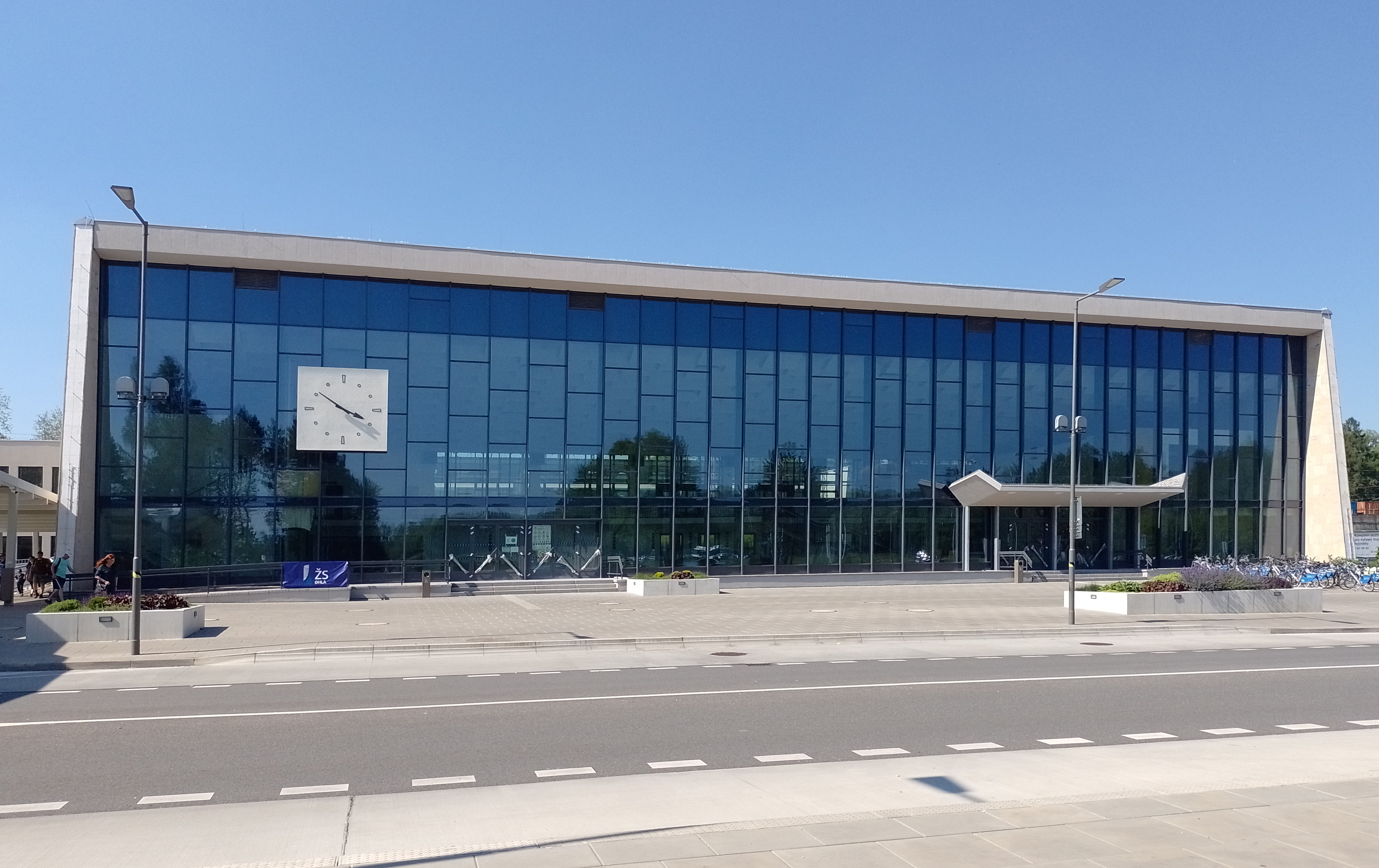
- Historic building of Havířov train station after reconstruction, 2022

General information
- Location: Havířov, Moravian-Silesian Region; Czech Republic
- Coordinates: 49°47′29″N 18°24′46″E
- Owner: Czech Republic
- Operator: Správa železnic

Construction
- Architect: Josef Hrejsemnou

Other information
- Station code: 54334540

History
- Opened: 1910
- Rebuilt: 1964-1969
Location
- Location within Czech Republic

Havířov railway station is (Czech: Havířov) a train station in Havířov, Czech Republic, located on a line between the cities of Ostrava and Český Těšín. Its main building is one of the best examples of the Czechoslovak avant-garde artistic movement known as the Brussels style of the 1960s.

== History ==
The first train station was opened at this place in 1910. After the city of Havířov was founded after the Second World War it was needed to rebuild the station and to build a new station building. The new building was built in 1964-1969 by the Moravian architect Josef Hrejsemnou in the so-called Brussels style. In the interior there is a huge glass mosaic designed by Czech painter and glass designer Vladimír Kopecký. The owner České dráhy (Czech Railways) plans to reconstruct the station with work projected to begin in 2019, which may include demolishing the station building. Many architects, art historians and others protest against this decision.

== Services ==
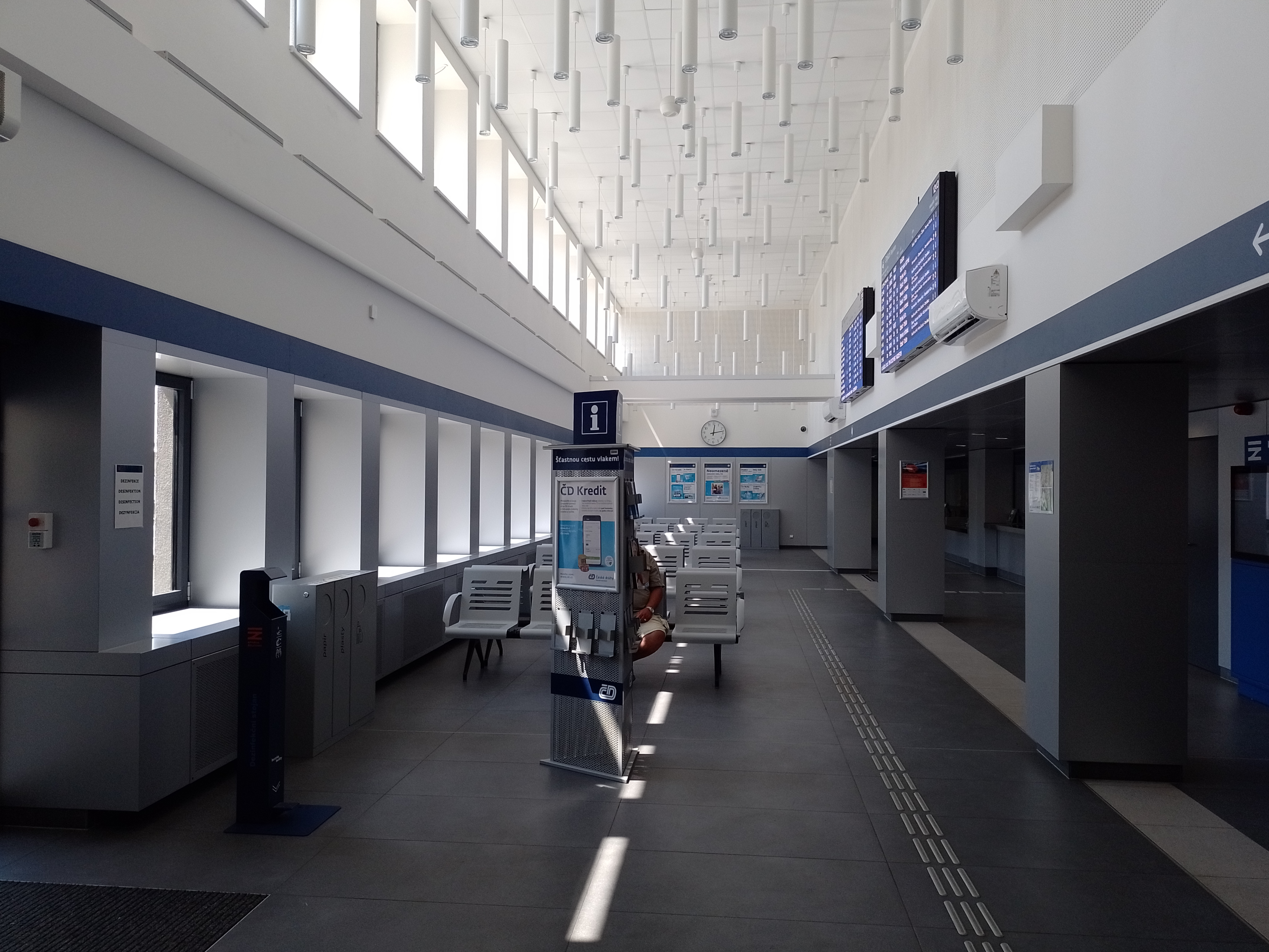
Interior of the new station hall, 2022

Preceding station	České dráhy	Following station
Šenov toward Ostrava	Stopping trains	Havířov–Suchá toward Český Těšín
Preceding station	RegioJet	Following station
Ostrava–Stodolní toward Prague	IC RegioJet	Terminus
