= Havířov =

- Statutory city
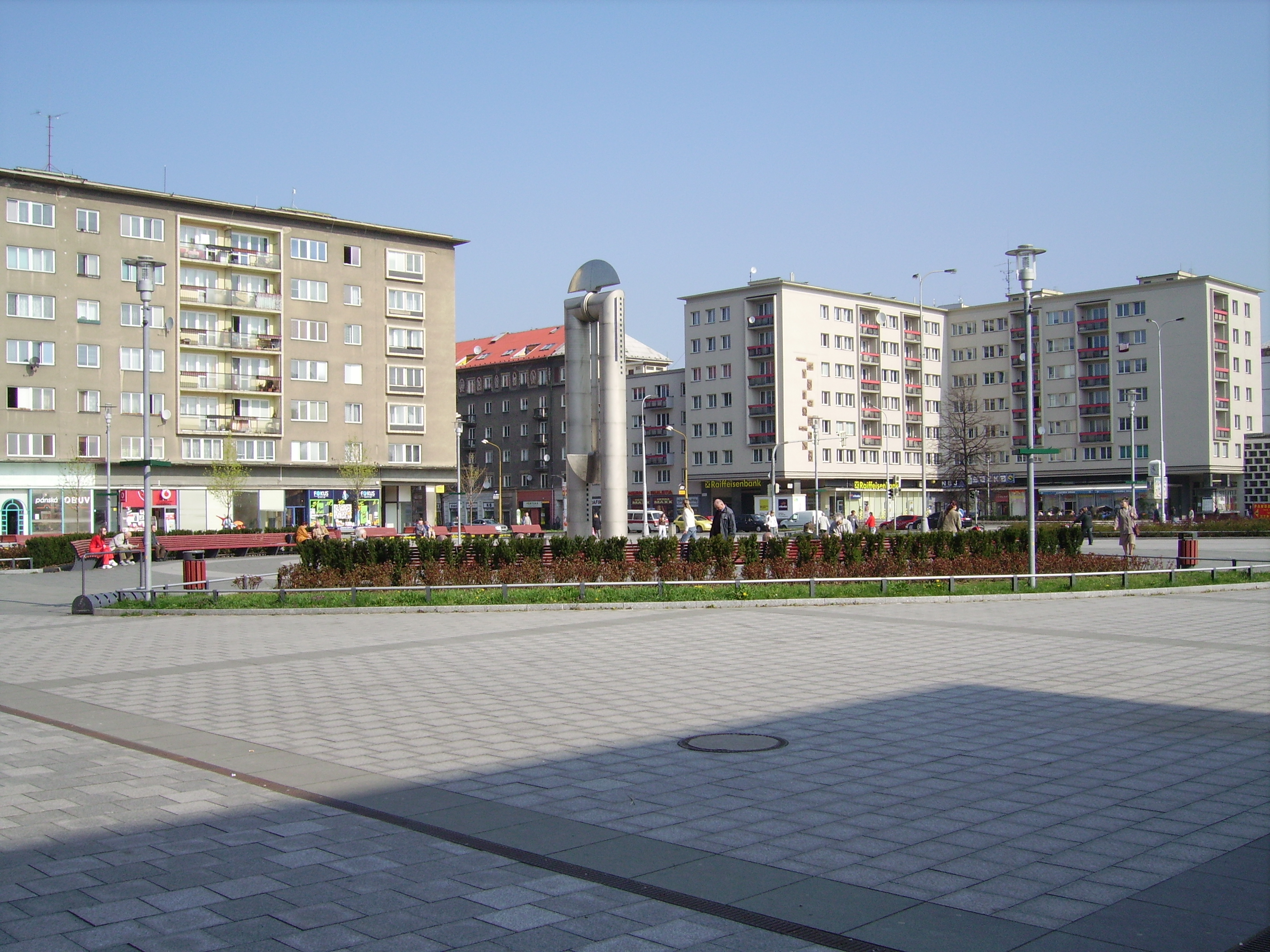
- The square Náměstí Republiky

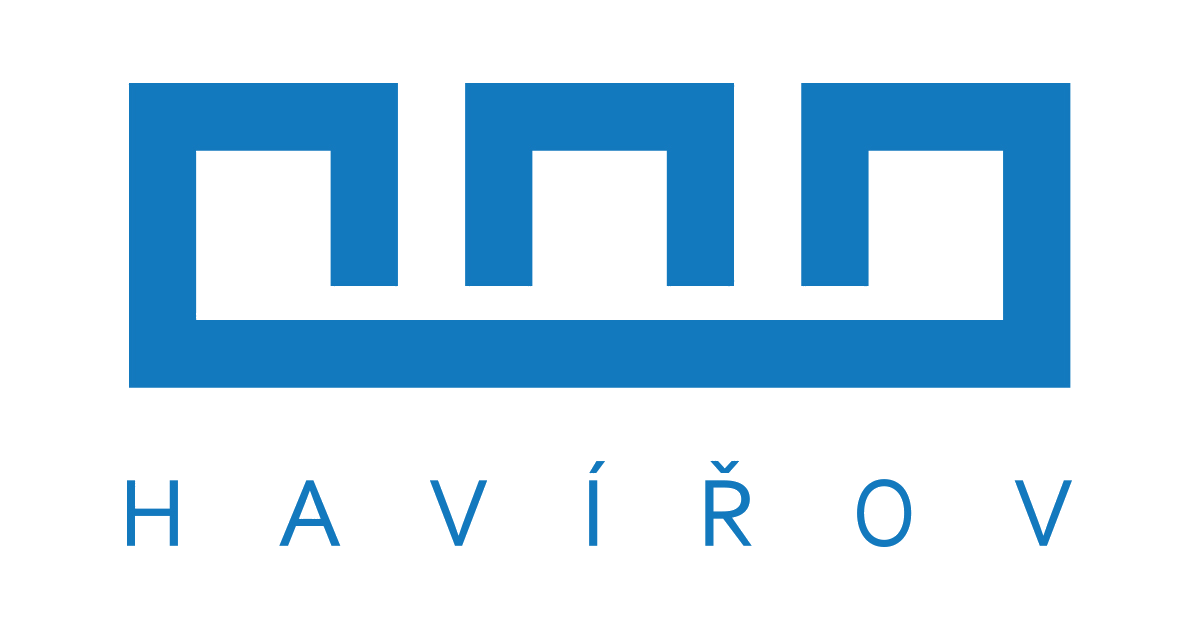
- Flag Coat of arms Wordmark

- Location in the Czech Republic
- Coordinates: 49°46′59″N 18°25′22″E
- Country: Czech Republic
- Region: Moravian-Silesian
- District: Karviná
- Founded: 1955

Government
  - Mayor: Iveta Kočí Palkovská (ANO 2011)

Area
  - Total: 32.08 km^{2} (12.39 sq mi)
- Elevation: 260 m (850 ft)

Population (2026-01-01)
  - Total: 67,998
  - Density: 2,120/km^{2} (5,490/sq mi)
- Time zone: UTC+1 (CET)
  - Summer (DST): UTC+2 (CEST)
- Postal code: 736 01
- Website: www.havirov-city.cz

Havířov (Czech pronunciation: [ˈɦaviːr̝of]) is a city in Karviná District in the Moravian-Silesian Region of the Czech Republic. It has about 68,000 inhabitants, making it the second largest city in the region. The city is located on the Lučina River, on the border between the Ostrava Basin and Moravian-Silesian Foothills.

Havířov was founded in 1955 and is the youngest Czech city. It is an industrial city, historically associated with hard coal mining in the region.

== Administrative division ==
Havířov consists of eight municipal parts (in brackets population according to the 2021 census):

- Bludovice (2,616)
- Dolní Datyně (580)
- Dolní Suchá (1,011)
- Město (28,871)
- Podlesí (13,660)
- Prostřední Suchá (4,439)
- Šumbark (15,668)
- Životice (1,308)

== Etymology ==
In a competition to name the city in 1956, various names were suggested, such as Stalin, Gottwaldův Horníkov (after Klement Gottwald), Zápotockýgrad (after Antonín Zápotocký) and Čestprácov (derived from the socialist-era greeting čest práci). Eventually it was decided that the city should be named Havířov (from havíř, i.e. 'coal miner', with the possessive suffix -ov).

== Geography ==
Havířov is located about 8 kilometres (5 mi) east of Ostrava and is urbanistically fused with neighbouring Šenov. It lies in the historical region of Cieszyn Silesia. It lies mostly in the Ostrava Basin, but the municipal territory also extends into the Moravian-Silesian Foothills in the south. The Lučina River flows through the town.

== History ==
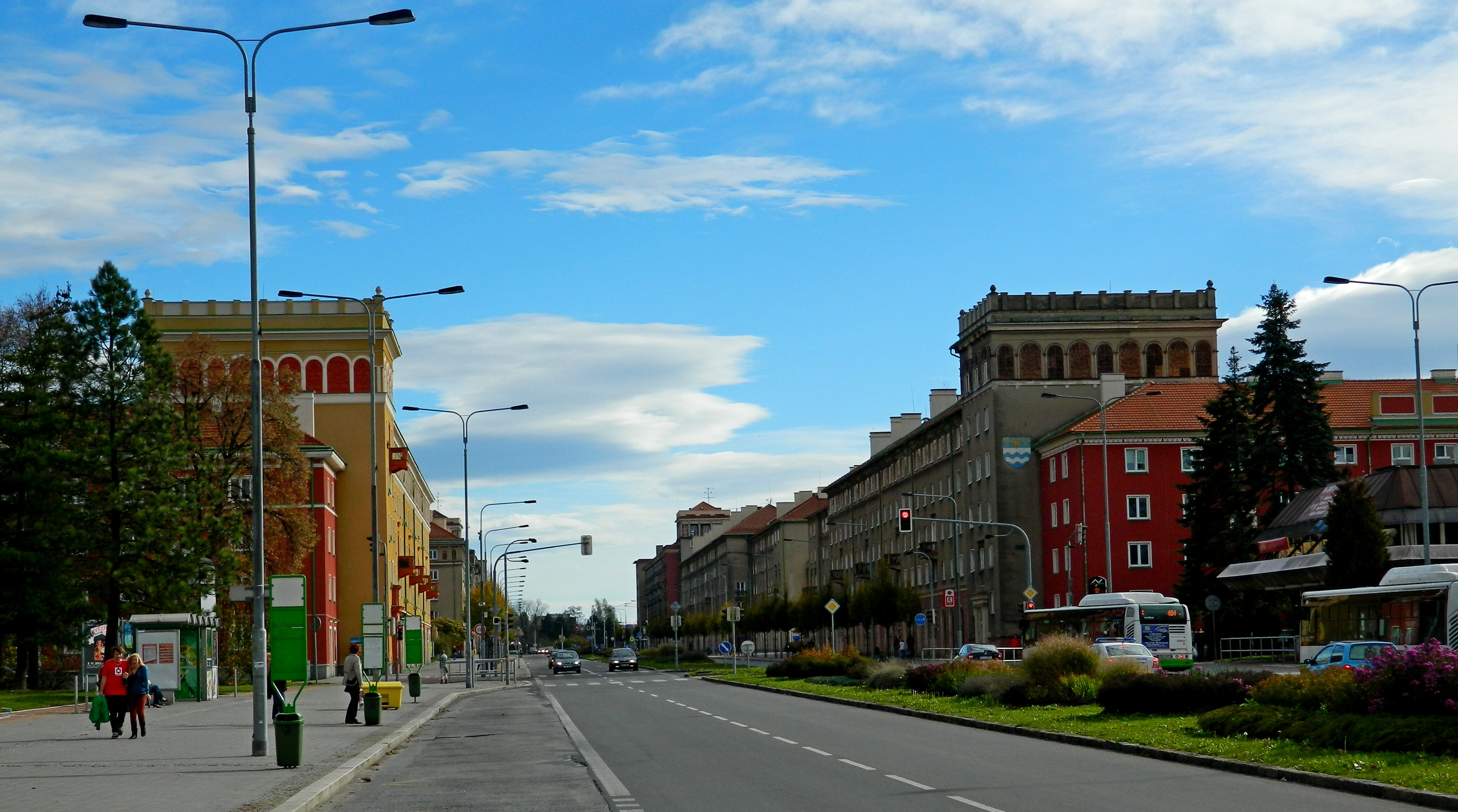
Main boulevard

The first written mention of settlements in today's Havířov area is from 1305 (Horní Suchá and Dolní Suchá). Bludovice was first mentioned in 1335 and Šumbark in 1438.

Havířov was founded on top of several villages with significant Polish populations after World War II as a coal mining town to restore hard coal mining in the region. Building of first housing estates for miners and their families began in 1947. Havířov was officially established in 1955 and in the same year received the status of a town.

Today, the original villages are administrative parts of the city and mostly lie on the outskirts of urban Havířov. In 1975–1990, Horní Suchá, now a separate municipality, was a part of Havířov.

Most of the buildings of the new city were built in the style of socialist realism.

== Demographics ==
Historical population

Year	Pop.	±%
1869	5,173	—
1880	5,379	+4.0%
1890	5,900	+9.7%
1900	7,223	+22.4%
1910	10,409	+44.1%

Year	Pop.	±%
1921	11,765	+13.0%
1930	12,782	+8.6%
1950	12,898	+0.9%
1961	51,103	+296.2%
1970	82,068	+60.6%

Year	Pop.	±%
1980	85,946	+4.7%
1991	86,297	+0.4%
2001	85,855	−0.5%
2011	76,694	−10.7%
2021	68,153	−11.1%

Source: Censuses

Havířov is the largest Czech city that is not a district capital.

== Economy ==
The city is historically connected with the mining of hard coal in the region. In the territory of Dolní Suchá was the Dukla coal mine, which was in operation between 1907 and 2007.

== Transport ==
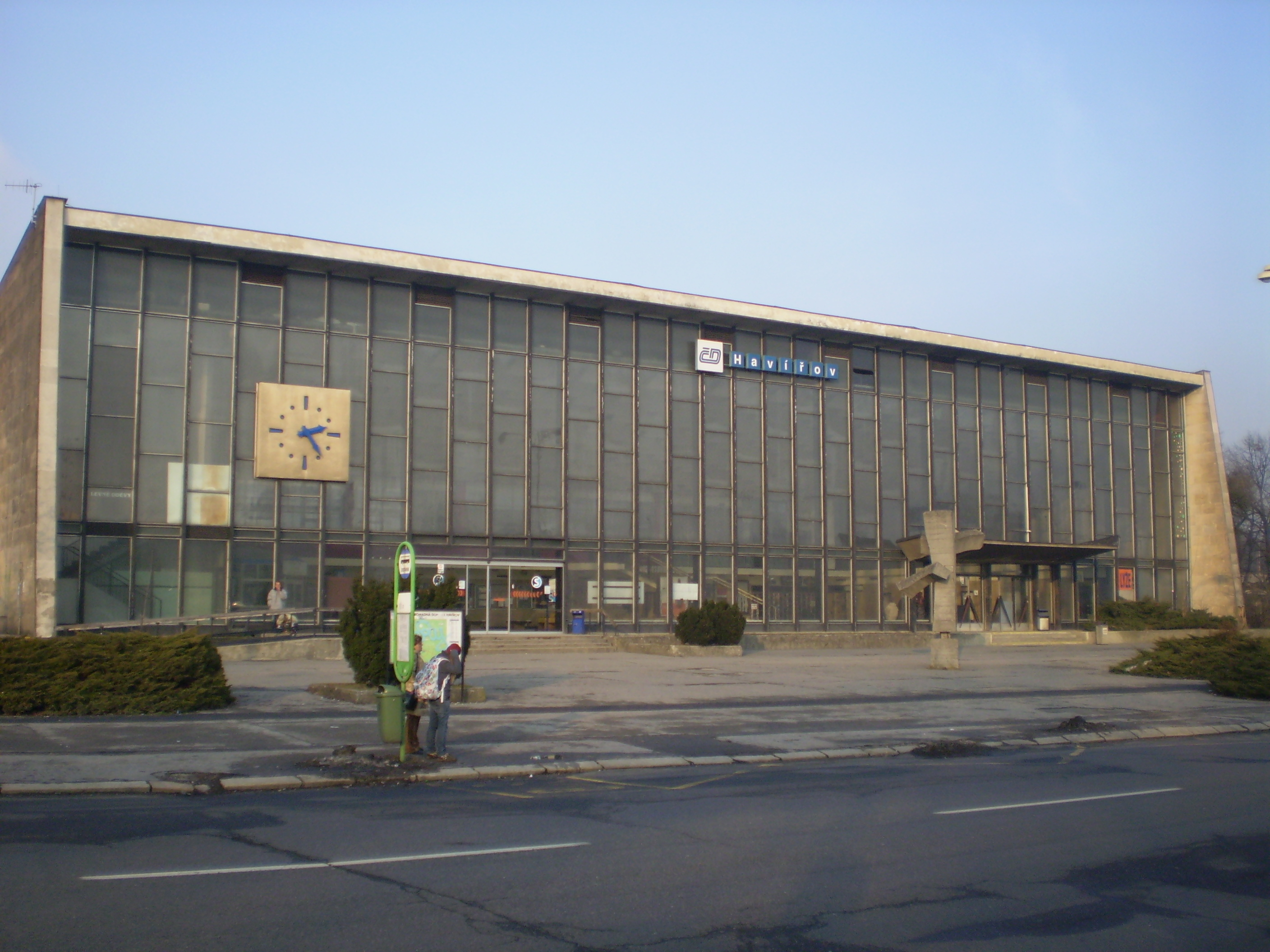
Havířov railway station

Havířov lies on the railway line of national importance to Prague via Ostrava and Olomouc. It also lies on a railway line heading from Český Těšín to Opava.

== Sport ==
The city's football club, MFK Havířov, competes in the Moravian-Silesian Football League (third tier). In the past, the team appeared for several seasons in the second tier. Football club MFK Havířov was founded in 1922 as ČSK Moravská Suchá. MFK Havířov has two pitches and one artificial pitch. They have nickname which is "indians" according to American bikers. Their matches are played on pitches in Prostřední Suchá.

The ice hockey club AZ Havířov appears in the 1st Czech Republic Hockey League, the second-tier league of ice hockey in the country.

The town is also represented by RC Havířov in rugby. The club used to play in the highest Czech division of rugby.

Havířov hosted the prologue and the third stage, both an individual time trial, of the 2012 and 2013 Gracia-Orlová.

== Sights ==
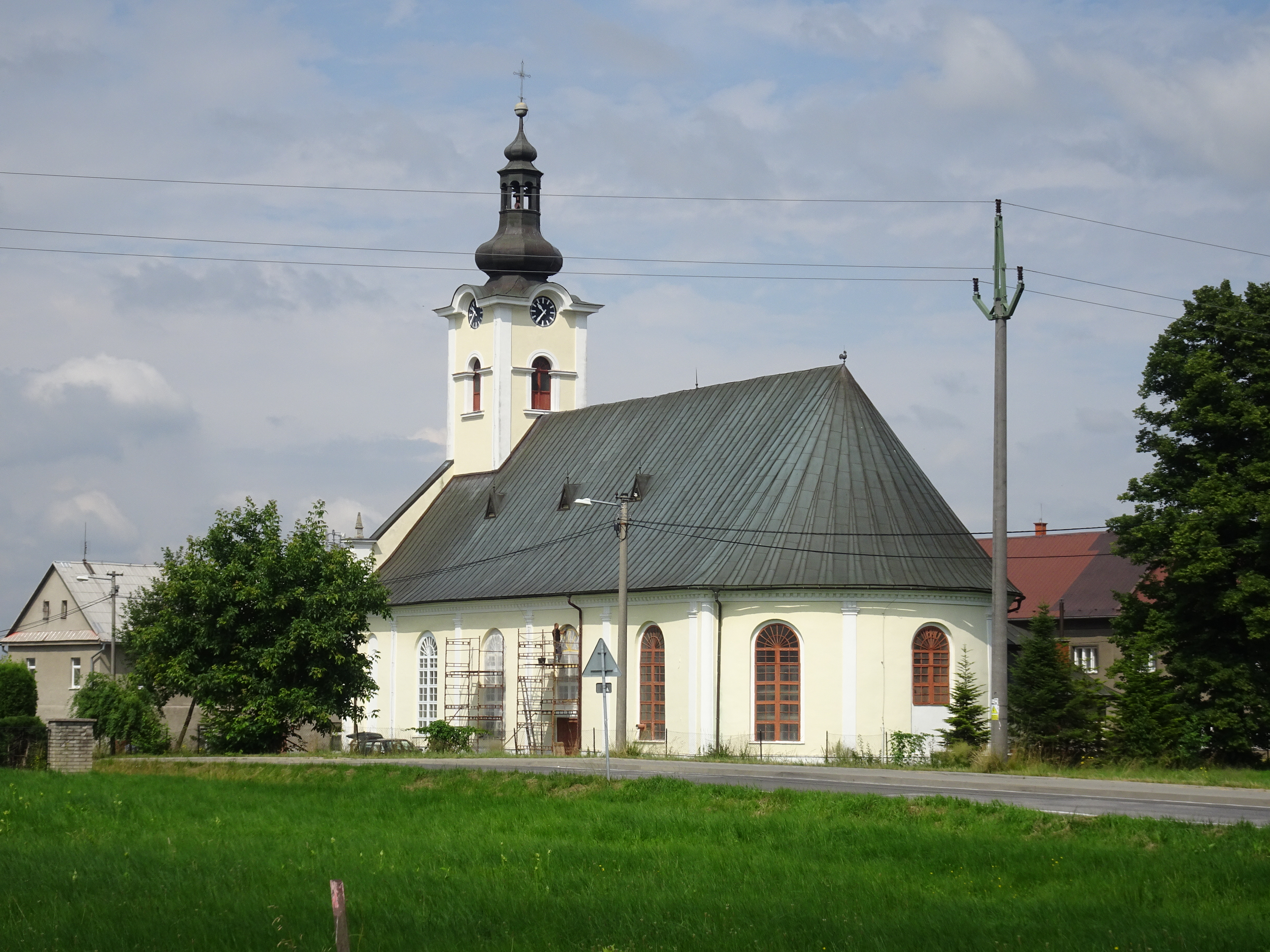
Lutheran church in Bludovice

The most important monument is the memorial to the victims of Nazi terror, protected as a national cultural monument. It was built in 1949. The monument consists of a granite wall with a sandstone sculpture of a woman with a child.

There are three churches, protected as cultural monuments. The Church of Saint Anne was built in the Empire style in 1841–1845. The Church of Saint Margaret the Virgin in Bludovice was built in 1786–1792. It is a typical Baroque rural church. The Lutheran church in Bludovice was built in 1782–1784 and is the oldest church in Havířov. The tower was added in 1850–1852.

The Šumbark Castle was originally a medieval fortress, rebuilt into a Renaissance castle in the 16th century and then rebuilt in the Baroque style in the 18th century. Today it is a hotel.

A unique remnant of the original villages before the founding of the city is Kotula's log cabin. It dates from 1781. Today it is a small museum with an exhibition of folk housing in the region. Next to the log cabin is a barn from the late 17th century and a windmill.

== Notable people ==
- Jan Bystroń (1860–1902), Polish linguist
- Józef Kiedroń (1879–1932), Polish mining engineer and politician
- Ota Zaremba (1957–2026), weightlifter, Olympic champion
- Martin Mainer (born 1959), artist and professor
- Petr Korbel (born 1971), table tennis player
- Daniel Zítka (born 1975), footballer
- Jan Laštůvka (born 1982), footballer
- Dominik Graňák (born 1983), ice hockey player
- Robert Mayer (born 1989), ice hockey player
- Pavel Maslák (born 1991), sprinter
- Kateřina Pauláthová (born 1993), alpine skier
- David Pastrňák (born 1996), ice hockey player
- Ondřej Lingr (born 1998), footballer

== Twin towns – sister cities ==
Havířov is twinned with:

- Collegno, Italy
- Harlow, England, United Kingdom
- Jastrzębie-Zdrój, Poland
- Mažeikiai, Lithuania
- Omiš, Croatia
- Paide, Estonia
- Turčianske Teplice, Slovakia
- Zagorje ob Savi, Slovenia
