= Horní Suchá =

Horní Suchá Sucha Górna
- Municipality
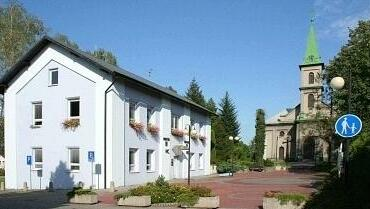
- Centre of Horní Suchá

- Flag Coat of arms

- Location in the Czech Republic
- Coordinates: 49°47′52″N 18°28′55″E
- Country: Czech Republic
- Region: Moravian-Silesian
- District: Karviná
- First mentioned: 1305

Area
  - Total: 9.80 km^{2} (3.78 sq mi)
- Elevation: 280 m (920 ft)

Population (2026-01-01)
  - Total: 4,341
  - Density: 443/km^{2} (1,150/sq mi)
- Time zone: UTC+1 (CET)
  - Summer (DST): UTC+2 (CEST)
- Postal code: 735 35
- Website: www.hornisucha.cz

Horní Suchá (Czech pronunciation: [ˈɦorɲiː ˈsuxaː]; Polish: Sucha Górna, German: Obersuchau) is a municipality and village in the Karviná District in the Moravian-Silesian Region of the Czech Republic. It has about 4,300 inhabitants. The municipality has a significant Polish minority.

== Etymology ==
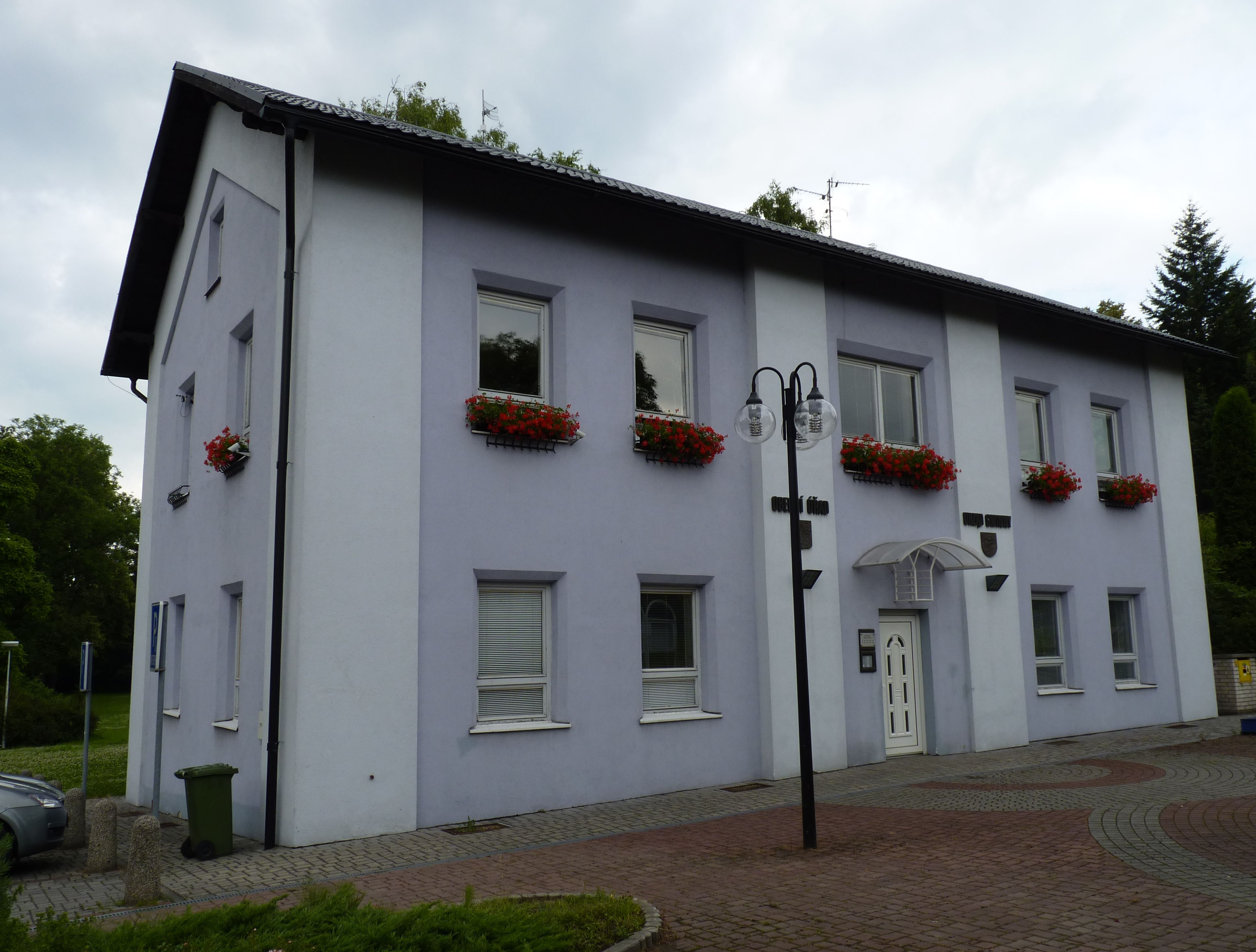
Municipal office, originally a school

The name Suchá literally means 'dry'. According to one theory, the name is derived from the name of a hypothetical river or stream Sucha, which dried up. The prefix Horní means 'upper', denoting its upper location in comparison to the nearby settlements of Prostřední Suchá ('middle Suchá') and Dolní Suchá ('lower Suchá').

== Geography ==
Horní Suchá is located next to Havířov, about 13 kilometres (8 mi) southeast of Ostrava. It lies in the historical region of Cieszyn Silesia in the Ostrava Basin.

== History ==
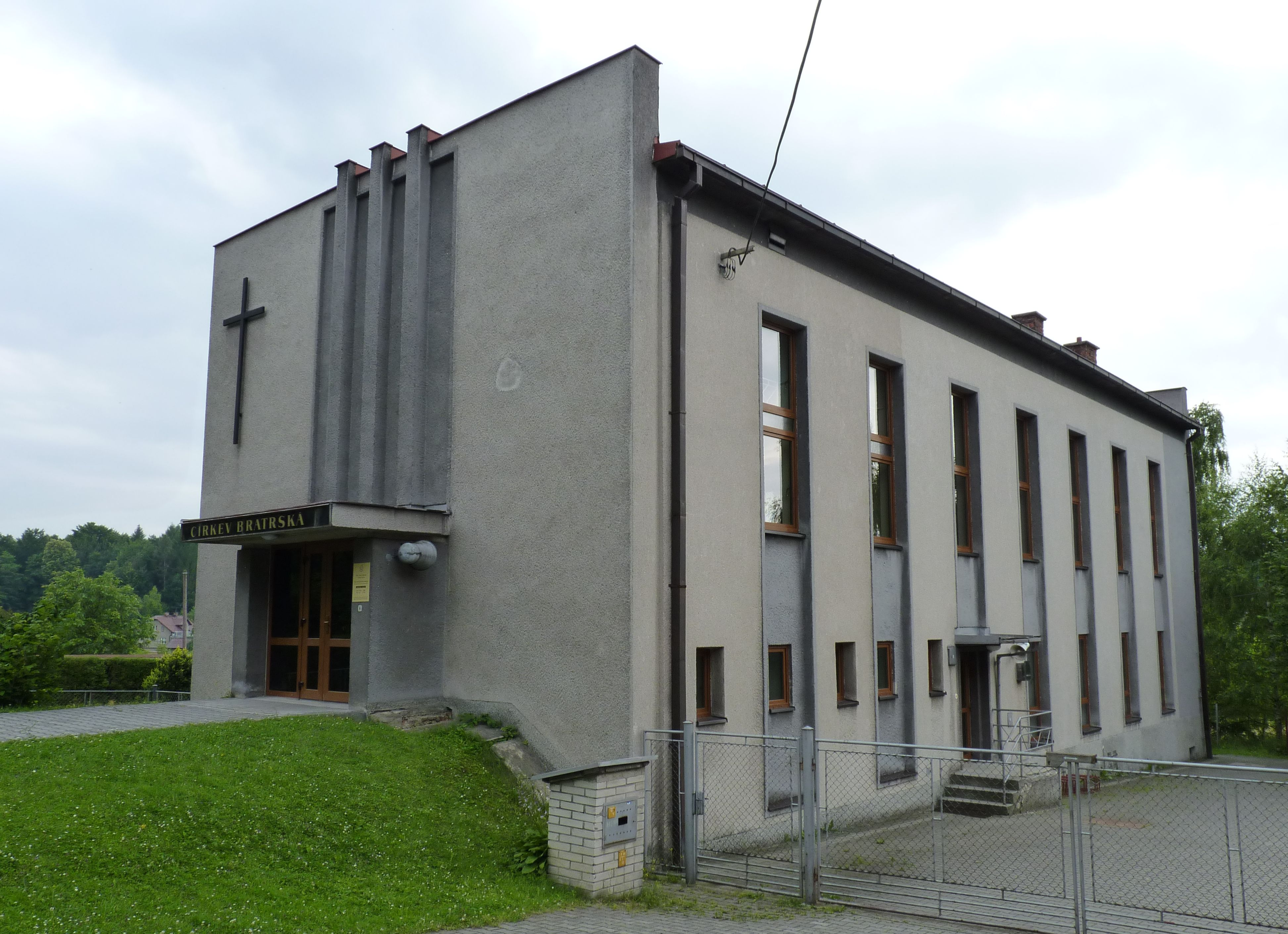
Church of the Brethren prayer house

Horní Suchá may have been founded by Polish monks from the Order of Saint Benedict from the Orlová monastery. The first mention of the village comes from a Latin document of the Diocese of Wrocław called Liber fundationis episcopatus Vratislaviensis from around 1305 as Sucha utraque (i.e. "both Suchas" in Latin (the other being Dolní Suchá).

Horní Suchá belonged initially to the Duchy of Cieszyn, established during the fragmentation of Poland into smaller duchies. It was ruled by the Dukes of Cieszyn until 1471, after which it was passed between various Polish and German families. The livelihood of the inhabitants was mainly agriculture, to a lesser extent also linen. A castle in Horní Suchá was first mentioned in 1674. However, it was not an aristocratic residence, but only an administration building.

=== 19th century ===
In 1805, the northern part of Horní Suchá was bought by Count Johann Larisch-Mönnich, then Minister of Finance of the Austrian Empire. The Larisch-Mönnich family became the most important owners of the village and during their rule, Horní Suchá experienced a rapid expansion. The first school was built in 1810. In 1832, the count founded a sugar factory here, which was in operation until 1876. At that time, it was one of the most modern in the Austrian Empire.

After the Revolutions of 1848 in the Austrian Empire, a modern municipal division was introduced in the re-established Austrian Silesia. The village as a municipality was subscribed at least since 1880 to political district and legal district of Freistadt.

According to the censuses conducted in 1880–1910 the population of the municipality grew from 1,532 in 1880 to 2,761 in 1910. The majority were Polish-speakers (between 96.1% and 97.9%), accompanied by Czech-speakers (growing from 2 or 0.1% in 1890 to 66 or 2.4% in 1910), and German-speakers (between 1.5% and 2.8%). In terms of religion, in 1910 the majority were Roman Catholics (76.8%), followed by Protestants (22.6%) and Jews (15 or 0.5%).

=== 20th century ===
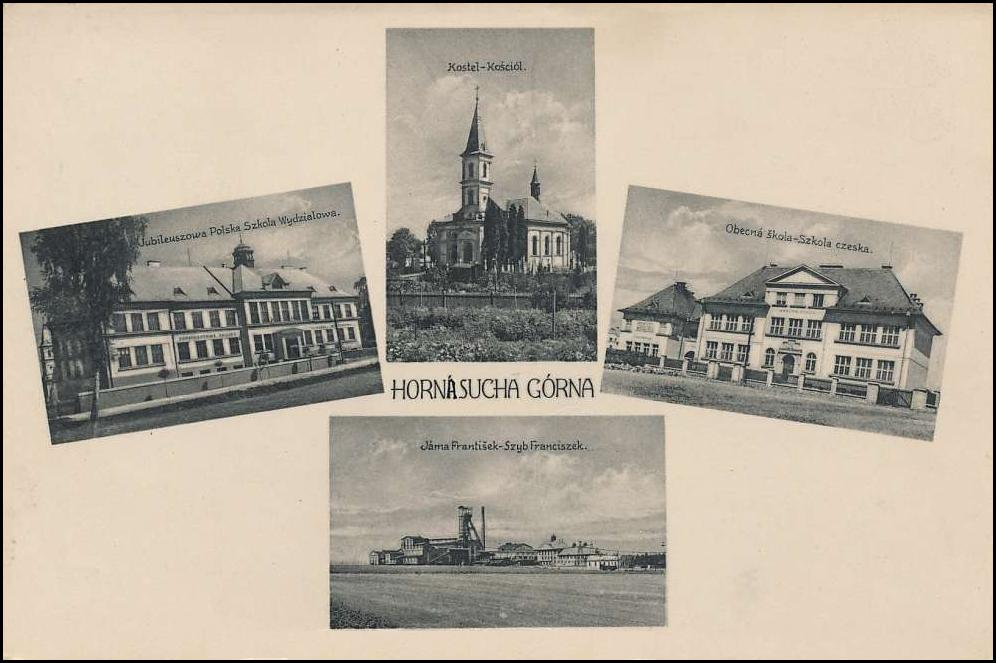
Postcard from Horní Suchá, 1928

The industrial development of Horní Suchá continued in the 20th century. In 1907 the construction of the railway was started, and in 1910 a brickyard and a ceramic plant were built. The hard coal mine named František was founded by the Larisch-Mönnich family in 1911. During its existence, the mine has employed thousands of people, which helped the further development of Horní Suchá in following decades.

After World War I, Horní Suchá was affected by the Polish–Czechoslovak War and the division of Cieszyn Silesia in 1920. Horní Suchá then became a part of Czechoslovakia. Following the Munich Agreement in October 1938, Horní Suchá as well as Prostřední Suchá and Dolní Suchá were overrun by the Polish army. The Trans-Olza region was annexed by Poland, and governed by Frysztat County of Silesian Voivodeship.

The Polish occupation ended after the German attack on Poland. Under German occupation, Horní Suchá was part of the Province of Upper Silesia (Regierungsbezirk Kattowitz). During this period, Horní Suchá, Prostřední Suchá and Dolní Suchá were merged into one municipality named Sucha. The municipality was liberated by the Red Army on 3 May 1945.

After World War II, the development of Horní Suchá and the construction of infrastructure for the mine employees continued. New school, cultural and sports facilities were gradually opened. In 1980 the construction of a new housing estate called Chrost was completed.

From 1975 until 1990 Horní Suchá was merged with the neighbouring city of Havířov.

== Demographics ==
According to the 2021 Census, Polish minority makes up 15.1% of the population.

Historical population

| Year | Pop. | ±% |
|---|---|---|
| 1869 | 1,476 | — |
| 1880 | 1,532 | +3.8% |
| 1890 | 1,677 | +9.5% |
| 1900 | 1,998 | +19.1% |
| 1910 | 2,761 | +38.2% |

| Year | Pop. | ±% |
|---|---|---|
| 1921 | 3,561 | +29.0% |
| 1930 | 3,805 | +6.9% |
| 1950 | 4,501 | +18.3% |
| 1961 | 5,298 | +17.7% |
| 1970 | 4,498 | −15.1% |

| Year | Pop. | ±% |
|---|---|---|
| 1980 | 3,974 | −11.6% |
| 1991 | 4,315 | +8.6% |
| 2001 | 4,370 | +1.3% |
| 2011 | 4,333 | −0.8% |
| 2021 | 4,231 | −2.4% |

Source: Censuses

== Economy ==
The closure of the František Mine in 1999 caused high unemployment in the municipality. In 2010, an industrial zone established by the municipality was opened on the site of the former mine, which houses more than 25 companies employing several hundred people. The largest industrial company is KATEK Czech Republic, an electrical engineering manufacturer with more than 250 employees.

== Transport ==
Horní Suchá is located on the railway line heading from Opava and Ostrava to Český Těšín.

== Education ==
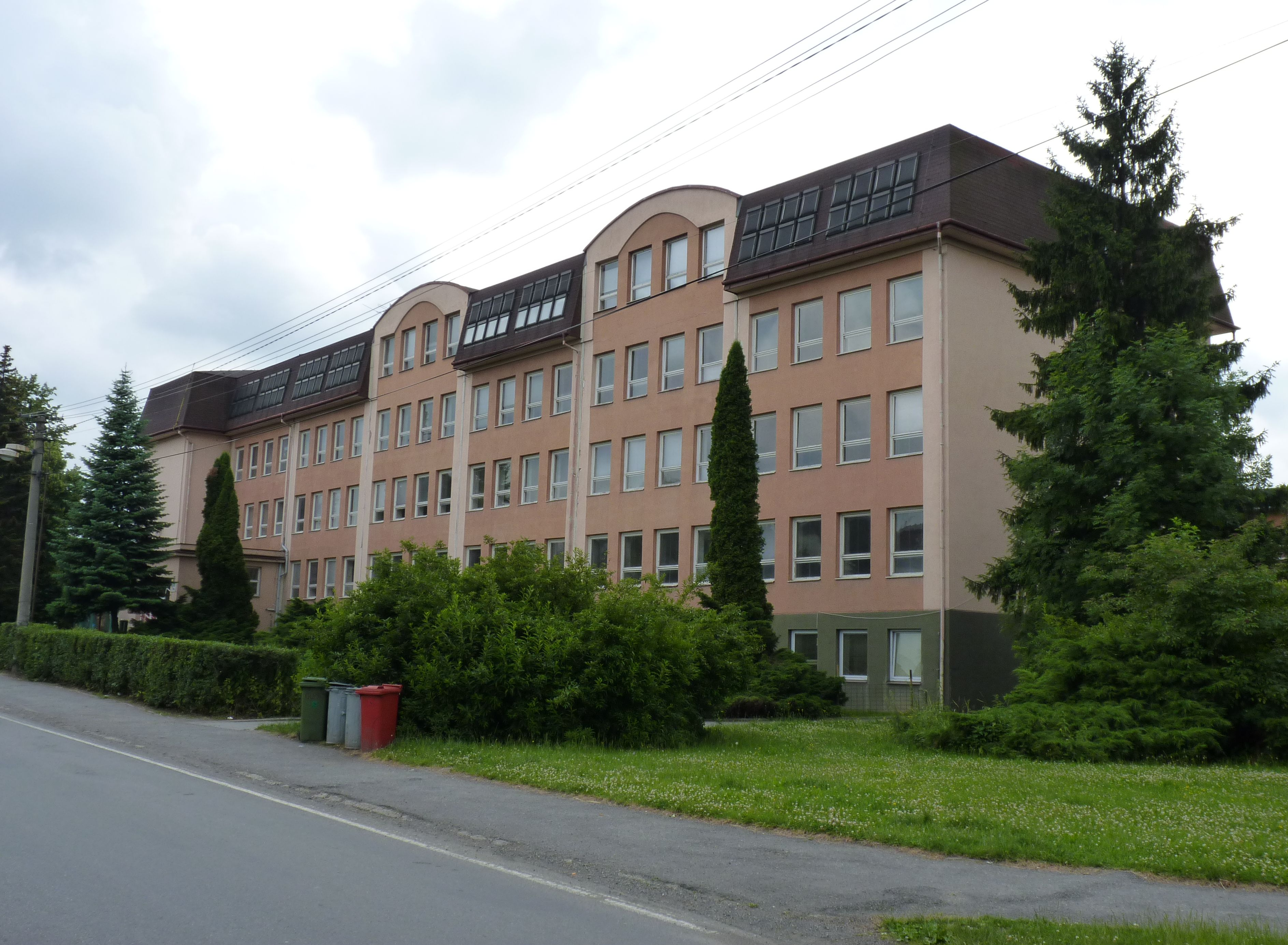
Czech school

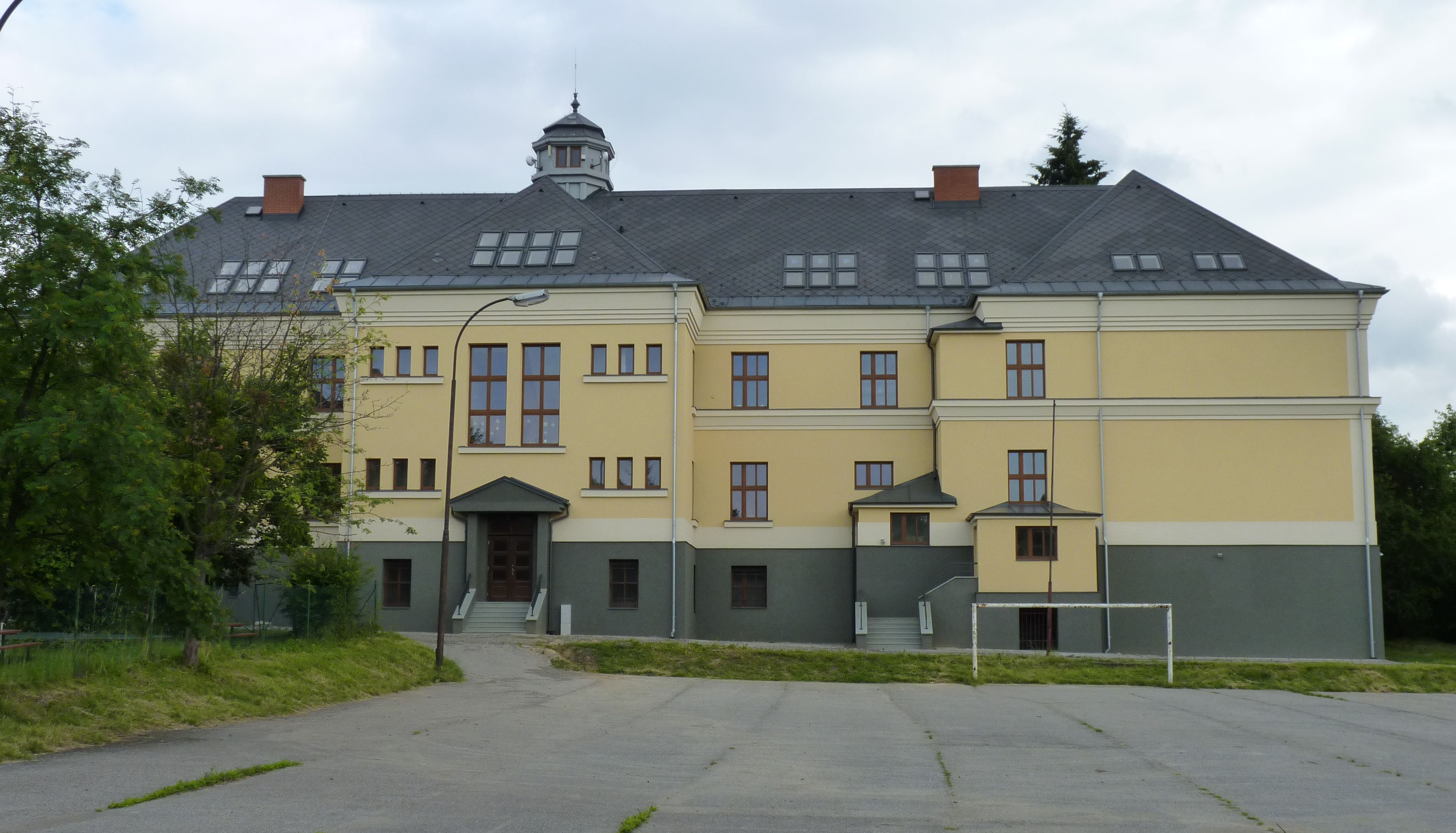
Polish school

The first school in Horní Suchá was founded in 1810 and a new school building, today the municipal office, was erected in 1838. Since 1870, there has been taught in Polish and in 1921 Czech classes were opened. In 1961, a new school building was built and the Czech and Polish schools were separated. Today there are two kindergartens and two primary schools, one pair teaching in Czech and one in Polish.

== Sights ==
The main landmark of Horní Suchá is the Church of Saint Joseph. It was built in 1864 by rebuilding a chapel from 1835, the capacity of which was insufficient for the number of local believers.

== Notable people ==
- Tadeusz Michejda (1879–1956), Polish physician and politician; worked here
- Adolf Kantor (1910–1992), Polish boxer
- Marie Glázrová (1911–2000), actress
- Bronislav Poloczek (1939–2012), Polish-Czech actor
- Ota Zaremba (1957–2026), weightlifter, Olympic champion; lived here

== Twin towns – sister cities ==
Horní Suchá is twinned with:

- Gelnica, Slovakia
- Lubomia, Poland
- Nižná, Slovakia
