= Dolní Suchá =

Coordinates: 49°48′20″N 18°25′50″E

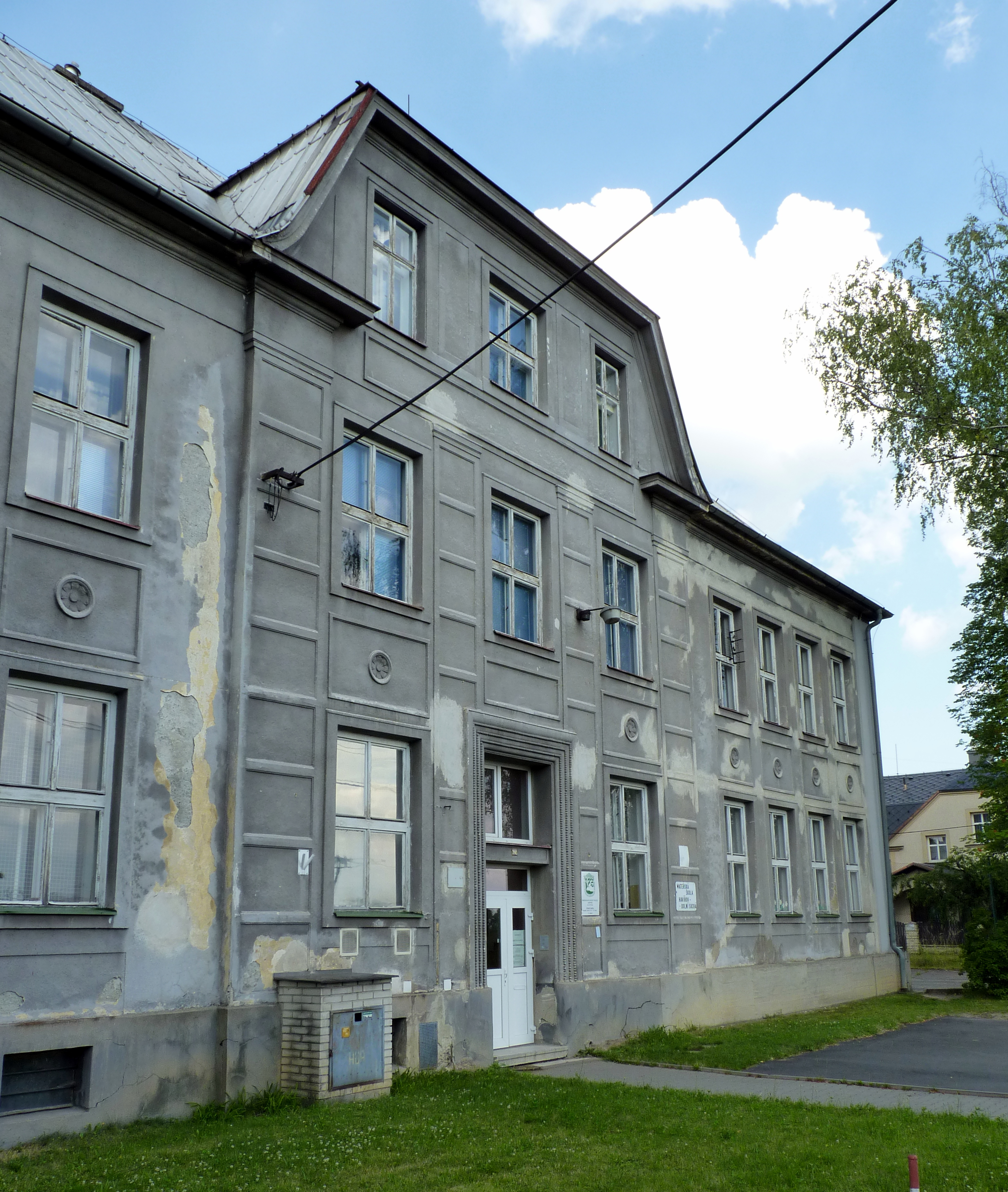
Local school

Dolní Suchá (Polish: Sucha Dolna, German: Nieder Suchau) is a village in Karviná District, Moravian-Silesian Region, Czech Republic. It was a separate municipality but became administratively a part of Havířov in 1960. It has a population of 901 (2020). The village lies in the historical region of Cieszyn Silesia.

The name is of topographic origin, supposedly derived from an older name of a hypothetical river or stream Sucha, literally dry, therefore disappearing. The supplementary adjective Dolní (German: Nieder, Polish: Dolna) means Lower denoting its lower location in comparison to sister settlements: Prostřední Suchá (Middle) and Horní Suchá (Upper).

== History ==
The village was first mentioned in a Latin document of Diocese of Wrocław called Liber fundationis episcopatus Vratislaviensis from around 1305 as item in Sucha utraque. It meant that there were two villages of that name (utraque meaning both in Latin), the other being Horní Suchá.

Politically the village belonged initially to the Duchy of Teschen, formed in 1290 in the process of feudal fragmentation of Poland and was ruled by a local branch of Silesian Piast dynasty. In 1327 the duchy became a fee of the Kingdom of Bohemia, which after 1526 became a part of the Habsburg monarchy.

After the Revolutions of 1848 in the Austrian Empire, a modern municipal division was introduced in the re-established Austrian Silesia. The village as a municipality was subscribed at least since 1880 to political district and legal district of Freistadt.

According to the censuses conducted in 1880, 1890, 1900 and 1910 the population of the municipality grew from 944 in 1880 to 2,237 in 1910. In terms of the dominant language spoken colloquially the situation was shifting through the censuses. In 1880 the majority were Czech-speakers (94.3%), followed by Polish-speakers (27 or 2.9%) and German-speakers (26 or 2.8%). In 1890 Czech-speakers constituted 55.9% and Polish-speakers 44.1%. The latter continued to grow to become majority (56.7% in 1900 and 58.9% in 1910), whereas the former formed minority (42.6% in 1900 and 38.1% in 1910). In 1910 they were accompanied by 57 (2.6%) German-speakers and 8 others. In terms of religion, in 1910 the majority were Roman Catholics (60.1%), followed by Protestants (38.6%), Jews (21 or 0.9%) and 10 others. The village was also traditionally inhabited by Silesian Lachs, speaking Cieszyn Silesian dialect, additionally industrial growth lured a large influx of migrant workers, mostly from western Galicia.

== Dukla mine ==
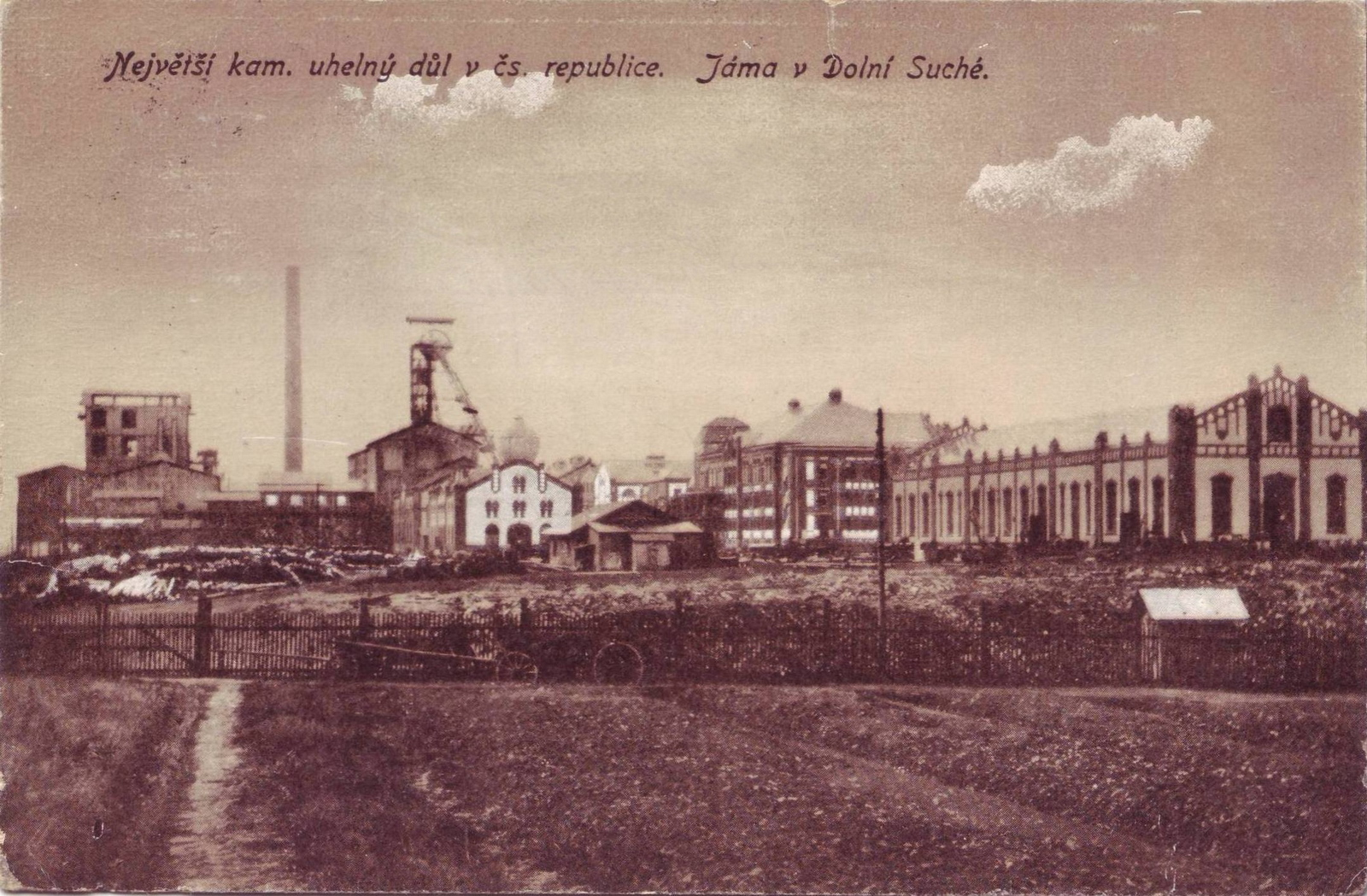
Sucha mine in 1924

There was a coal mine in the village - Dukla Mine. It was founded in 1905 as Kaiser Franz Joseph Schacht. The mining operations began in 1911-1912. After World War I, the fall of Austria-Hungary, the Polish–Czechoslovak War and the division of Cieszyn Silesia in 1920, the village became a part of Czechoslovakia and it was renamed to Jáma Suchá. Following the Munich Agreement, in October 1938 together with the Zaolzie region it was annexed by Poland, administratively organised in Frysztat County of Silesian Voivodeship. The village was then annexed by Nazi Germany at the beginning of World War II. After the war it was restored to Czechoslovakia.

In 1949 the coal mine was renamed to Důl Dukla (Dukla Coal Mine). During the operation of the Dukla Coal Mine more than 100 million tons of coal were mined. On the 19 June 2008 the last tower of the coal mine measuring 96 metres (315 ft) was detonated.

== See also ==
- Polish minority in the Czech Republic
- Dukla 61
