= Jan Stanisław Bystroń =

Polish sociologist and ethnographer

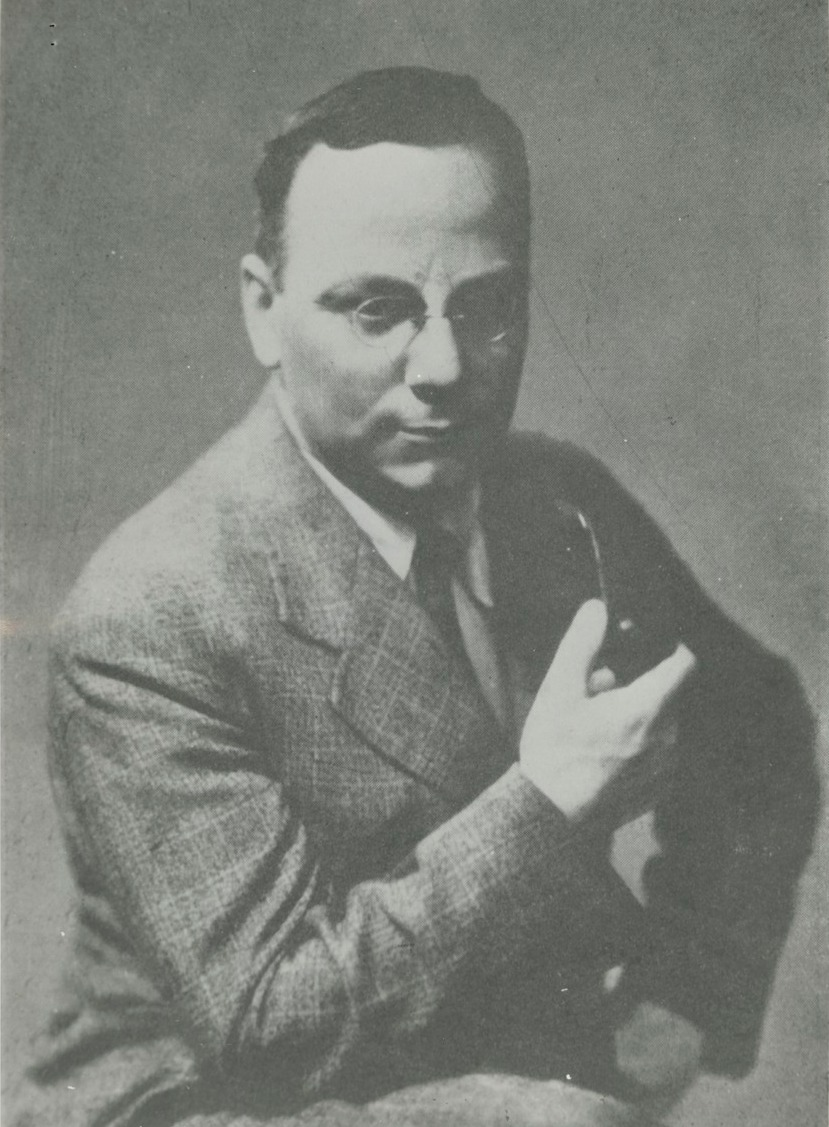
Jan Stanisław Bystroń.

Jan Stanisław Bystroń (20 December 1892 in Kraków – 18 November 1964 in Warsaw) was a Polish sociologist and ethnographer. Professor of University of Poznań, University of Warsaw and Jagiellonian University in Kraków, member of Polish Academy of Sciences.

== Biography ==
Bystroń was in 1892 as son of Jan Bystroń, a notable linguist. From 1918, he was a Professor of Ethnology at Jagiellonian University in Kraków, and in 1919–1925 he served as director of the Institute of Ethnology at the University of Poznań. From 1934, Bystroń taught sociology and culture at the University of Warsaw, and was also director of the university's Institute of Sociology until 1948.

During the German occupation of Poland, Bystroń was imprisoned in Pawiak for several months; he was one of the teachers in the underground education in Poland during World War II. After the war, Bystroń was a member of the Polish Academy of Sciences from 1952. He died in 1964.

== Works ==
His major works were in the area of Polish culture and Polish folklore.
