= Jan Bystroń (linguist) =

Polish linguist (1860–1902)

- Born: 13 June 1860; Datynie Dolne, Austrian Silesia, Austrian Empire
- Died: 30 June 1902 (aged 42); Kraków, Galicia, Austria-Hungary
- Citizenship: Austrian
- Occupation: Linguist
- Children: Jan Stanisław Bystroń

Jan Bystroń (13 June 1860 in Datynie Dolne – 30 June 1902 in Kraków) was a Polish linguist.

== Life ==
Bystroń specialized in the dialects of Cieszyn Silesia.

He graduated from Polish elementary school in Błędowice Dolne, gymnasium in Teschen (1881) and Jagiellonian University in Kraków (1886).

He was the father of the noted sociologist, Jan Stanisław Bystroń.

== Works ==
- Rok 1863 w literaturze niemieckiej (1883)
- O mowie polskiej w dorzeczu Stonawki i Łucyny w Księstwie Cieszyńskim (1885)
- Rozbiór porównawczy znanych dotąd najdawniejszych tekstów Modlitwy Pańskiej, Pozdrowienia Anielskiego, Składu Apostolskiego i Dziesięciorga Przykazań (1885)
- Przyczynek do historyi języka polskiego z początku XV wieku. Na podstawie zapisków sądowych w księdze ziemi czerskiej (1887)
- Lessings Epigramme und seine Arbeiten zur Theorie des Epigramms (1889)
- O szyku wyrazów w języku polskim (1892)
- Drobne przyczynki do składni polskiej z uwględnieniem składni języków klasycznych (1893)
- O języku Baltazara Opecia w dziele "Żywot Jezu Krysta" (1893)
- O użyciu genetivu w języku polskim (1893)
- Przyczynek do bibljografii litewskiej (1893)

== See also ==
- List of Poles
