= 2010–11 FK Dukla Prague season =

Dukla Prague
2010–11 season
- Chairman: Martin Lafek
- Manager: Luboš Kozel
- Stadium: Stadion Juliska
- Czech 2. Liga: 1st (champions)
- CMFS Cup: Third Round
- Top goalscorer: League: Dani Chigou (19); All: Dani Chigou (21)
- Highest home attendance: 2,520 v Viktoria Žižkov (1 April 2011)
- Lowest home attendance: League: 465 v Znojmo (1 October 2010); Cup: 425 v Jablonec (28 September 2010)
| Home colours | Away colours |

The 2010-11 season was Dukla Prague's fourth consecutive season in the Czech 2. Liga. The club finished the season in first place, winning promotion to the Gambrinus liga. Dukla reached the top of the table after thirteen games, and stayed there for the rest of the season, maintaining an unbeaten record at home for the whole season.

== Players ==
=== Transfers ===
==== In ====
Over the summer, Dukla signed Radim Nečas from Mladá Boleslav and brought back Ondřej Vrzal on a year-long loan from Viktoria Plzeň.

In the winter transfer window, sixteen-year-old striker Patrik Svoboda joined from Kladno with six players going the other way on loan. Also joining Dukla at this time were two forwards: AC Sparta Prague's Martin Jirouš, who signed on a loan deal until 31 January 2012, and Jan Pázler from Slavia Prague. Goalkeeper Tomáš Kučera also arrived to provide backup for Rada. Martin Bayer left to join third league side Ovčáry and Robert Kokoška departed for Bohemians 1905.

==== Out ====
In the summer, former national team striker Michal Kolomazník retired at the age of 33 with a career-ending knee problem. Veteran goalkeeper Martin Svoboda left after two seasons at the club. Striker Tomáš Kulvajt was released. Martin Macháček went out on loan to Sezimovo Ústí for the first half of the season.

In the winter, Dukla sent six players out on loan to SK Kladno as part of the deal for Patrik Svoboda. These players were Jakub Sklenář, Jakub Jakubov, Martin Macháček, Donát Laczkovich, David Radosta and Jaroslav Kmoch. Striker Pavel Vrána went out on loan to Karviná. Ukrainian forward Vadym Antipov, who had only managed one league appearance in the first 15 matches, transferred to FK Mažeikiai in Lithuania.

== Statistics ==
=== Appearances and goals ===
- Starts + Substitute appearances.

| No. | Pos | Nat | Player | Total | | League | | Cup | |
| No. | Pos | Nat | Player | Apps | Goals | Apps | Goals | Apps | Goals |
|---|---|---|---|---|---|---|---|---|---|
| 1 | GK | (Czech Republic) CZE | Filip Rada | 30 | 0 | 28+0 | 0 | 2+0 | 0 |
| 2 | DF | (Czech Republic) CZE | Michal Šmíd | 26 | 0 | 25+0 | 0 | 1+0 | 0 |
| 3 | DF | (Czech Republic) CZE | Ondřej Kučera | 11 | 0 | 0+8 | 0 | 3+0 | 0 |
| 4 | DF | (Czech Republic) CZE | Tomáš Pospíšil | 22 | 0 | 15+5 | 0 | 1+1 | 0 |
| 5 | MF | (Czech Republic) CZE | Marek Hanousek | 29 | 4 | 25+1 | 3 | 3+0 | 1 |
| 6 | MF | (Czech Republic) CZE | Pavel Hašek | 30 | 4 | 27+0 | 3 | 2+1 | 1 |
| 7 | FW | (Czech Republic) CZE | Martin Jirouš | 11 | 1 | 5+6 | 1 | 0+0 | 0 |
| 8 | FW | (Ukraine) UKR | Vadym Antipov | 2 | 0 | 0+1 | 0 | 1+0 | 0 |
| 8 | FW | (Czech Republic) CZE | Jan Pázler | 13 | 2 | 6+7 | 2 | 0+0 | 0 |
| 9 | DF | (Czech Republic) CZE | Jan Vorel | 29 | 1 | 27+0 | 1 | 2+0 | 0 |
| 10 | FW | (Hungary) HUN | Donát Laczkovich | 7 | 1 | 3+3 | 0 | 1+0 | 1 |
| 11 | FW | (Czech Republic) CZE | Radim Nečas | 8 | 1 | 0+7 | 1 | 1+0 | 0 |
| 12 | MF | (Czech Republic) CZE | Matěj Marič | 1 | 0 | 0+1 | 0 | 0+0 | 0 |
| 13 | MF | (Czech Republic) CZE | Tomáš Berger | 30 | 7 | 25+3 | 7 | 1+1 | 0 |
| 14 | MF | (Czech Republic) CZE | Patrik Gedeon | 12 | 1 | 10+2 | 1 | 0+0 | 0 |
| 17 | FW | (Czech Republic) CZE | Pavel Vrána | 17 | 3 | 6+8 | 2 | 2+1 | 1 |
| 18 | FW | (Cameroon) CMR | Dani Chigou | 27 | 21 | 21+4 | 19 | 2+0 | 2 |
| 19 | MF | (Czech Republic) CZE | Ondřej Šiml | 30 | 2 | 27+1 | 2 | 2+0 | 0 |
| 21 | FW | (Czech Republic) CZE | Jan Svatonský | 30 | 5 | 23+5 | 5 | 1+1 | 0 |
| 22 | MF | (Czech Republic) CZE | Vojtěch Přeučil | 20 | 1 | 5+12 | 0 | 2+1 | 1 |
| 23 | MF | (Czech Republic) CZE | Ondřej Vrzal | 18 | 1 | 14+4 | 1 | 0+0 | 0 |
| 24 | MF | (Czech Republic) CZE | Petr Malý | 27 | 5 | 22+2 | 4 | 1+2 | 1 |
| 25 | DF | (Slovakia) SVK | Peter Mičic | 12 | 0 | 8+1 | 0 | 3+0 | 0 |
| 26 | DF | (Czech Republic) CZE | David Mikula | 9 | 1 | 8+1 | 1 | 0+0 | 0 |
| 29 | GK | (Czech Republic) CZE | Jakub Jakubov | 1 | 0 | 0+0 | 0 | 1+0 | 0 |
| 30 | GK | (Slovakia) SVK | Tomáš Kučera | 2 | 0 | 2+0 | 0 | 0+0 | 0 |
| | FW | (Czech Republic) CZE | Jakub Sklenář | 2 | 1 | 0+1 | 1 | 0+1 | 0 |
| | FW | (Czech Republic) CZE | Patrik Svoboda | 1 | 0 | 0+1 | 0 | 0+0 | 0 |
| | MF | (Czech Republic) CZE | David Radosta | 1 | 0 | 0+0 | 0 | 1+0 | 0 |

=== Goalscorers ===
| Pos | Nat | Player | LIG | CUP | Total |
|---|---|---|---|---|---|
| 1 | (Cameroon) | Dani Chigou | 19 | 2 | 21 |
| 2 | (Czech Republic) | Tomáš Berger | 7 | 0 | 7 |
| 3 | (Czech Republic) | Jan Svatonský | 5 | 0 | 5 |
| 3 | (Czech Republic) | Petr Malý | 4 | 1 | 5 |
| 5 | (Czech Republic) | Marek Hanousek | 3 | 1 | 4 |
| 5 | (Czech Republic) | Pavel Hašek | 3 | 1 | 4 |
| 7 | (Czech Republic) | Pavel Vrána | 2 | 1 | 3 |
| 8 | (Czech Republic) | Jan Pázler | 2 | 0 | 2 |
| 8 | (Czech Republic) | Ondřej Šiml | 2 | 0 | 2 |
| 10 | (Czech Republic) | Patrik Gedeon | 1 | 0 | 1 |
| 10 | (Czech Republic) | Martin Jirouš | 1 | 0 | 1 |
| 10 | (Czech Republic) | David Mikula | 1 | 0 | 1 |
| 10 | (Czech Republic) | Radim Nečas | 1 | 0 | 1 |
| 10 | (Czech Republic) | Jakub Sklenář | 1 | 0 | 1 |
| 10 | (Czech Republic) | Jan Vorel | 1 | 0 | 1 |
| 10 | (Czech Republic) | Ondřej Vrzal | 1 | 0 | 1 |
| 10 | (Hungary) | Donát Laczkovich | 0 | 1 | 1 |
| 10 | (Czech Republic) | Vojtěch Přeučil | 0 | 1 | 1 |
| Own goals | | | 1 | 0 | 1 |
| | | Totals | 55 | 8 | 63 |

=== Disciplinary record ===
| Number | Nation | Position | Name | League | | Cup | | Total | |
| Number | Nation | Position | Name | Yellow card | Red card | Yellow card | Red card | Yellow card | Red card |
| 5 | (Czech Republic) | MF | Marek Hanousek | 4 | 1 | 0 | 0 | 4 | 1 |
| 2 | (Czech Republic) | DF | Michal Šmíd | 5 | 0 | 0 | 0 | 5 | 0 |
| 9 | (Czech Republic) | DF | Jan Vorel | 4 | 0 | 0 | 0 | 4 | 0 |
| 6 | (Czech Republic) | DF | Pavel Hašek | 3 | 0 | 0 | 0 | 3 | 0 |
| 21 | (Czech Republic) | FW | Jan Svatonský | 3 | 0 | 0 | 0 | 3 | 0 |
| 23 | (Czech Republic) | DF | Ondřej Vrzal | 3 | 0 | 0 | 0 | 3 | 0 |
| 4 | (Czech Republic) | DF | Tomáš Pospíšil | 2 | 0 | 0 | 0 | 2 | 0 |
| 8 | (Czech Republic) | FW | Jan Pázler | 2 | 0 | 0 | 0 | 2 | 0 |
| 13 | (Czech Republic) | MF | Tomáš Berger | 2 | 0 | 0 | 0 | 2 | 0 |
| 19 | (Czech Republic) | MF | Ondřej Šiml | 2 | 0 | 0 | 0 | 2 | 0 |
| 24 | (Czech Republic) | MF | Petr Malý | 2 | 0 | 0 | 0 | 2 | 0 |
| 11 | (Czech Republic) | FW | Radim Nečas | 1 | 0 | 0 | 0 | 1 | 0 |
| 14 | (Czech Republic) | DF | Patrik Gedeon | 1 | 0 | 0 | 0 | 1 | 0 |
| 18 | (Cameroon) | FW | Dani Chigou | 1 | 0 | 0 | 0 | 1 | 0 |
| 22 | (Czech Republic) | MF | Vojtěch Přeučil | 1 | 0 | 0 | 0 | 1 | 0 |
| 25 | (Slovakia) | DF | Peter Mičic | 1 | 0 | 0 | 0 | 1 | 0 |
| 26 | (Czech Republic) | DF | David Mikula | 1 | 0 | 0 | 0 | 1 | 0 |
| | | | TOTALS | 38 | 0 | 0 | 0 | 38 | 0 |

=== Home attendance ===
| Competition | Average Attendance | Games |
|---|---|---|
| Czech 2. Liga | 844 | 15 |
| Cup | 425 | 1 |
| Average | 818 | 16 |

== Czech 2. Liga ==
=== League table ===
| Pos | Team | Pld | W | D | L | GF | GA | GD | Pts | Promotion or relegation |
|---|---|---|---|---|---|---|---|---|---|---|
| 1 | Dukla Prague (C, P) | 30 | 18 | 9 | 3 | 55 | 18 | +37 | 63 | Promotion to 2011–12 1. Liga |
| 2 | Viktoria Žižkov (P) | 30 | 16 | 7 | 7 | 44 | 31 | +13 | 55 | Promotion to 2011–12 1. Liga |
| 3 | Jihlava | 30 | 15 | 8 | 7 | 49 | 29 | +20 | 53 | |
| 4 | Karviná | 30 | 13 | 7 | 10 | 42 | 36 | +6 | 46 | |
| 5 | Třinec | 30 | 12 | 8 | 10 | 32 | 34 | −2 | 44 | |

Source: The Football Association of the Czech Republic
Rules for classification: 1) points; 2) head-to-head points; 3) head-to-head goal difference; 4) head-to-head goals scored; 5) goal difference; 6) number of goals scored.
(C) Champions; (P) Promoted

=== Matches ===
==== August ====
| 1 August 2010 Round 1 | Čáslav | 0 – 2 | Dukla Prague | Čáslav |
| | | Report | 6' Svatonský; 90+2' Chigou | Stadium: Stadion pod Hrádkem; Attendance: 1,023; Referee: Kocourek |

| 6 August 2010 Round 2 | Dukla Prague | 3 – 1 | Jihlava | Prague |
| | Chigou 12', 90+2'; Hašek 73' | Report | 85' Šimonek | Stadium: Stadion Juliska; Attendance: 513; Referee: Adam |

| 15 August 2010 Round 3 | Karviná | 1 – 1 | Dukla Prague | Karviná |
| | Ficek 70' | Report | 87' (pen.) Chigou | Stadium: Městský stadion (Karviná); Attendance: 1,960; Referee: Jiří Jech |

| 20 August 2010 Round 4 | Dukla Prague | 2 – 0 | Třinec | Prague |
| | Chigou 42'; Šiml 44' | Report | | Stadium: Stadion Juliska; Attendance: 480; Referee: K. Hrubeš |

| 29 August 2010 Round 5 | Viktoria Žižkov | 2 – 1 | Dukla Prague | Prague |
| | Marković 79', 89' (pen.) | Report | 15' Chigou; (red card) 88' Hanousek | Stadium: FK Viktoria Stadion; Attendance: 2,235; Referee: Příhoda |

==== September ====
| 3 September 2010 Round 6 | Dukla Prague | 2 – 0 | Most | Prague |
| | Malý 56'; Chigou 59' | Report | | Stadium: Stadion Juliska; Attendance: 618; Referee: P. Franěk |

| 11 September 2010 Round 7 | Sparta Prague "B" | 0 – 3 | Dukla Prague | Prague |
| | | Report | 33' Vorel; 66', 70' Vrána | Stadium: Na Chvalech; Attendance: 584; Referee: Adam |

| 17 September 2010 Round 8 | Dukla Prague | 2 – 0 | Hlučín | Prague |
| | Chigou 75'; Sklenář 88' | Report | | Stadium: Stadion Juliska; Attendance: 493; Referee: Hrubeš |

| 26 September 2010 Round 9 | Varnsdorf | 0 – 0 | Dukla Prague | Varnsdorf |
| | | Report | | Stadium: Městský stadion v Kotlině; Attendance: 1,016; Referee: Makovička |

==== October ====
| 1 October 2010 Round 10 | Dukla Prague | 2 – 0 | Znojmo | Prague |
| | Hanousek 75'; Šiml 88' | Report | | Stadium: Stadion Juliska; Attendance: 465; Referee: Bílek |

| 9 October 2010 Round 11 | Vlašim | 2 – 1 | Dukla Prague | Vlašim |
| | Jungr 5'; Bukač 23' (pen.) | Report | 19' Chigou | Stadium: Stadion Kollárova ulice Attendance: 1,590; Referee: Dagmar Damková |

| 17 October 2010 Round 12 | Kladno | 0 – 2 | Dukla Prague | Kladno |
| | | Report | 25' (pen.) Chigou; 58' Malý | Stadium: Stadion Františka Kloze; Attendance: 1,157; Referee: Drábek |

| 22 October 2010 Round 13 | Dukla Prague | 1 – 1 | Sezimovo Ústí | Prague |
| | Chigou 76' (pen.) | Report | 83' Mach | Stadium: Stadion Juliska; Attendance: 520; Referee: Paták |

| 30 October 2010 Round 14 | Zlín | 0 – 0 | Dukla Prague | Zlín |
| | | Report | | Stadium: Letná Stadion; Attendance: 2,548; Referee: Jiří Jech |

==== November ====
| 7 November 2010 Round 15 | Dukla Prague | 1 – 0 | Sokolov | Prague |
| | Berger 1' | Report | | Stadium: Stadion Juliska; Attendance: 600; Referee: Hájek |

==== March ====
| 5 March 2011 Round 16 | Dukla Prague | 5 – 0 | Čáslav | Prague |
| | Vrzal 21'; Chigou 60'; Pázler 64'; Svatonský 82'; Gedeon 86' | Report | (red card) 44' Haniak | Stadium: Stadion Juliska; Attendance: 835; Referee: Adam |

| 11 March 2011 Round 17 | Jihlava | 0 – 0 | Dukla Prague | Jihlava |
| | | Report | | Stadium: Stadion v Jiráskově ulici Attendance: 2,890; Referee: Kocourek |

| 19 March 2011 Round 18 | Dukla Prague | 3 – 1 | Karviná | Prague |
| | Svatonský 36'; Chigou 50'; Hašek 83' (pen.) | Report | 90' Knötig | Stadium: Stadion Juliska; Attendance: 653; Referee: Libor Kovařík |

| 26 March 2011 Round 19 | Třinec | 1 – 1 | Dukla Prague | Třinec |
| | Hanus 50'; Oboya (red card) 73' | Report | 73' Hanousek | Stadium: Stadion Rudolfa Labaje; Attendance: 1,531; Referee: Drábek |

==== April ====
| 1 April 2011 Round 20 | Dukla Prague | 1 – 1 | Viktoria Žižkov | Prague |
| | Berger 15' | Report | 28' Kropík | Stadium: Stadion Juliska; Attendance: 2,520; Referee: Dagmar Damková |

| 9 April 2011 Round 21 | Most | 1 – 1 | Dukla Prague | Most |
| | Danoski 74' | Report | 41' (o.g.) Běloušek | Stadium: Fotbalový stadion Josefa Masopusta; Attendance: 835; Referee: K. Hrubeš |

| 15 April 2011 Round 22 | Dukla Prague | 2 – 0 | Sparta Prague "B" | Prague |
| | Malý 52'; Nečas 58' | Report | | Stadium: Stadion Juliska; Attendance: 1,520; Referee: Jiří Jech |

| 24 April 2011 Round 23 | Hlučín | 2 – 1 | Dukla Prague | Hlučín |
| | Mozol 3'; Bartošák 70' | Report | 35' (pen.) Hašek | Stadium: Městský stadion (Hlučín); Attendance: 782; Referee: Zelinka |

| 29 April 2011 Round 24 | Dukla Prague | 4 – 0 | Varnsdorf | Prague |
| | Svatonský 6'; Hanousek 21'; Chigou 29'; Malý 88' | Report | | Stadium: Stadion Juliska; Attendance: 750; Referee: Franěk |

==== May ====
| 8 May 2011 Round 25 | Znojmo | 0 – 3 | Dukla Prague | Znojmo |
| | Hnaníček (red card) 71' | Report | 44' Berger; 63', 79' Chigou | Stadium: Městský stadion (Znojmo); Attendance: 571; Referee: Libor Kovařík |

| 13 May 2011 Round 26 | Dukla Prague | 1 – 0 | Vlašim | Prague |
| | Chigou 45' | Report | | Stadium: Stadion Juliska; Attendance: 553; Referee: Jílek |

| 20 May 2011 Round 27 | Dukla Prague | 3 – 1 | Kladno | Prague |
| | Berger 38'; Chigou 47'; Mikula 60' | Report | 15' (pen.) Wojnar | Stadium: Stadion Juliska; Attendance: 1,158; Referee: Dagmar Damková |

| 27 May 2011 Round 28 | Sezimovo Ústí | 1 – 2 | Dukla Prague | Sezimovo Ústí |
| | Šmíd 33' (o.g.) | Report | 28' Jirouš; 66' Berger | Stadium: Sportovní areál Soukeník; Attendance: 687; Referee: Kocourek |

==== June ====
| 4 June 2011 Round 29 | Dukla Prague | 2 – 0 | Zlín | Prague |
| | Berger 13', 57' | Report | | Stadium: Stadion Juliska; Attendance: 985; Referee: Dagmar Damková |

| 27 May 2011 Round 30 | Sokolov | 3 – 3 | Dukla Prague | Sokolov |
| | Mlika 8', 25'; Čada 45' | Report | 51' Chigou; 55' Pázler; 59' Svatonský | Stadium: Stadion FK Baník Sokolov; Attendance: 1,230; Referee: Ochotnický |

== Cup ==
Dukla reached the third round of the cup competition. This was the same progress as the club made in the previous season.

As a 2. Liga team, Dukla entered the Cup in the first round. After easing past amateur side Česká Lípa in their first match, Dukla travelled to fellow 2. Liga side Sezimovo Ústí. Despite conceding the first goal, Dukla ran out 3–2 winners.

In the third round Dukla faced Gambrinus liga outfit Jablonec. Despite opening the scoring through Dani Chigou, Jablonec managed to equalise and the match went to a penalty shoot-out. Even after the regular five attempts each, both teams missed the sixth penalty. Goalkeeper Filip Rada took the seventh and missed, but Jablonec striker Tomáš Pekhart made no mistake from the spot to put Jablonec in the next round and send Dukla out of the competition.

| 24 July 2010 First Round | Arsenal Česká Lípa | 1 – 4 | Dukla Prague | Česká Lípa |
| | Hottek 33' | Report | 51' (pen.) Chigou; 63' Hašek; 81' Vrána; 82' Malý | Stadium: Městský stadion u Ploučnice; Attendance: 480; Referee: Jiří Jech |

| 7 September 2010 Second Round | Sezimovo Ústí | 2 – 3 | Dukla Prague | Sezimovo Ústí |
| | Vukadinović 21'; Kostečka 56' | Report | 30' Hanousek; 34' Laczkovich; 65' Přeučil | Stadium: Sportovní areál Soukeník; Attendance: 375; Referee: Dagmar Damková |

| 21 September 2010 Third Round | Dukla Prague | 1 – 1 (3 – 4 p) | Jablonec | Prague |
| | Chigou 54' | Report | 65' Eliáš | Stadium: Stadion Juliska; Attendance: 425; Referee: Pavel Královec |
| | Penalties |
| | Chigou (penalty scored); Hašek (penalty scored); Sklenář (penalty missed); Malý (penalty scored); Vorel (penalty missed); Šiml (penalty missed); Rada (penalty missed) | | (penalty missed) Jarolím; (penalty scored) Kovařík; (penalty scored) Pavlík; (penalty missed) Jablonský; (penalty scored) Lafata; (penalty missed) Vošahlík; (penalty scored) Pekhart |
