= 2010–11 Czech Cup =

Pohár ČMFS

Tournament details
- Country: Czech Republic
- Teams: 123

Final positions
- Champions: Mladá Boleslav
- Runners-up: Sigma Olomouc

Tournament statistics
- Top goal scorer(s): Jan Chramosta; Marek Bakoš (6 goals)

The 2010–11 Czech Cup was the 18th edition of the annual football knockout tournament organized by the Czech Football Association of the Czech Republic. It began on 18 July 2010 with the preliminary round and ended with the final on 25 May 2011.

Mladá Boleslav prevailed in Stadion v Jiráskově ulici, Jihlava at the 25 May 2011 Cupdefeating Sigma Olomouc, under a penalty score of 4–3. 5,430 in attendance.

== Teams ==
Round	Clubs remaining	Clubs involved	Winners from previous round	New entries this round	Leagues entering at this round
Preliminary round	123	22	none	22	Levels 4 and 5 in football league pyramid
First round	112	96	11	85	Czech 2. Liga; Bohemian Football League; Moravian-Silesian Football League; Czech Fourth Division
Second round	64	64	48	16	Czech First League
Third round	32	32	32	none	none
Fourth round	16	16	16	none	none
Quarter finals	8	8	8	none	none
Semi finals	4	4	4	none	none
Final	2	2	2	none	none

== Preliminary round ==
The Preliminary round took place on 18 July 2010.

Team 1	Score	Team 2
Železný Brod	0–7	1.FK Nová Paka
FK Lovosice	1–1; 0–3 pen	Sokol Brozany
FK Slavoj Český Krumlov	3–1	Jiskra Třeboň
Litol	1–1; 2–4 pen	FC Přední Kopanina
Citice	0–9	Jiskra Domažlice
Spartak Chrást	3–1	FC Zličín
SK Aritma Prague	2–2; 5–6 pen	FC Velim
SK Union Čelákovice	1–3	FK Pěnčín-Turnov
Brno Bohunice	0–2	Tasovice
Provodov	3–2	Broumov
Nový Jičín	w/o	Fulnek

== First round ==
The First round was played on 23, 24 and 25 July 2010. The match between FC Přední Kopanina and FC Chomutov was postponed and played on 31 July 2010.

Team 1	Score	Team 2
1.FK Nová Paka	0–4	SK Slovan Varnsdorf
Sokol Brozany	4–0	SK STAP-TRATEC Vilémov
FK Slavoj Český Krumlov	1–2	FC Písek
FC Přední Kopanina	1–1; 2-1 pen	FC Chomutov
Jiskra Domažlice	2–5	FK Baník Sokolov
Spartak Chrást	1–3	SK SENCO Doubravka
FC Velim	1–0	SK Kladno
FK Pěnčín-Turnov	0–3	FK Spartak MAS Sezimovo Ústí
SK Marila Votice	1–0	Polepy
Jiskra Ústí nad Orlicí	3–0	SK Jičín
Holice v Čechách	0–5	Fotbalový klub Pardubice
SK Semily	0–5	SK Hlavice
FK Trutnov	0–0; 5–4 pen	RMSK Cidlina Nový Bydžov
Dvůr Králové	1–1; 5–3 pen	FK AS Pardubice
FK OEZ Letohrad	2–0	FK Náchod
AFK Chrudim	0–1	FC Zenit Čáslav
SK Roudnice nad Labem	0–4	FK Litvínov
Podještědský FC Český Dub	0–3	Sokol Ovčáry
ARSENAL Česká Lípa	1–4	FK Dukla Prague
1. FC Karlovy Vary	1–3	FK Baník Most
FK Kolín	0–0; 3–2 pen	Loko Vltavín
FK Řezuz Děčín	2–3	FK Viktoria Žižkov
Slavoj Koloveč	1–4	FK Králův Dvůr
SK Strakonice 1908	0–1	Kunice
FK Meteor Prague VIII	2–2; 4–3 pen	SK Benešov
FK Hořovicko	4–2	FK Slavoj Vyšehrad
FK Admira Prague	0–1	Vlašim
FC Dolany	1–1; 3–4 pen	Šumperk
Mohelnice	0–2	Uničov
Mikulovice	0–1	SFC Opava
Sokol Lískovec	1–2	MFK OKD Karviná
FC Sparta Brno	0–1	1. SC Znojmo
TJ Valašské Meziříčí	2–1	Frýdek-Místek
Tasovice	0–3	Břeclav
Hodonín-Šardice	0–1	Líšeň
Provodov	2–2; 13–14 pen	FC Viktoria Otrokovice
SFK Vrchovina	1–1; 5–4 pen	FC Vysočina Jihlava
Horácký FK Třebíč	1–0	Velké Meziříčí
Nový Jičín	0–5	Kroměříž
ČSK Uherský Brod	1–6	Slavičín
FK Slavia Orlová-Lutyně	0–5	FC Hlučín
FC Slovan Rosice	1–1; 4–1 pen	Žďár n. Sázavou
FK Apos Blansko	0–3	1. HFK Olomouc
FC MSA Dolní Benešov	0–0; 2–4 pen	FC Vítkovice
SK Rostex Vyškov	2–1	FC Tescoma Zlín
MFK Havířov	0–2	FK Fotbal Třinec
Sokol Konice	3–1	Zábřeh
DOSTA Bystrc	1–2	Hulín

== Second round ==
The main date for second round matches was 1 September 2010.

Team 1	Score	Team 2
SK Marila Votice	0–1 (Note: Match played on 4 September.)	AC Sparta Prague
SK SENCO Doubravka	0–3	FK Baník Sokolov
FK Trutnov	1–2	FK Mladá Boleslav
FK Králův Dvůr	1–1; 4–5 pen	Kunice
FK Baník Most	1–4 (Note: Match played on 7 September.)	FC Viktoria Plzeň
FK Hořovicko	0–3	Vlašim
SK Slovan Varnsdorf	1–1; 5–4 pen	Bohemians 1905
Šumperk	0–4	SFC Opava
FK Kolín	0–3 (Note: Match played on 14 September.)	FC Slovan Liberec
Uničov	1–1; 2–4 pen	MFK OKD Karviná
FK Litvínov	0–3	Sokol Ovčáry
FC Slovan Rosice	1–2 (Note: Match played on 2 September.)	FC Zbrojovka Brno
Slavičín	0–0; 5–4 pen	FC Baník Ostrava
Břeclav	1–1; 7–6 pen	1. FC Slovácko
SFK Vrchovina	2–1	Líšeň
Kroměříž	2–1	FC Viktoria Otrokovice
Horácký FK Třebíč	2–1	1. SC Znojmo
Sokol Brozany	0–5	FK Teplice
FC Velim	1–2	SK Hlavice
FK Meteor Prague VIII	0–2	SK D.České Budějovice
FK OEZ Letohrad	1–0	FC Zenit Čáslav
FK Viktoria Žižkov	0–0; 4-3 pen	FC Hradec Králové
Fotbalový klub Pardubice	0–1	SK Slavia Prague
FC Přední Kopanina	1–5	FK Ústí nad Labem
FC Písek	1–0	1. FK Příbram
FC Vítkovice	1–2	FK Fotbal Třinec
Hulín	2–2; 5-4 pen	FC Hlučín
Jiskra Ústí nad Orlicí	2–5	SK Sigma Olomouc
SK Rostex Vyškov	1–3	1. HFK Olomouc
Sokol Konice	5–1	TJ Valašské Meziříčí
FK Spartak MAS Sezimovo Ústí	2–3	FK Dukla Prague
Dvůr Králové	0–5 (Note: Match played on 25 August.)	FK Baumit Jablonec

== Third round ==
The Third round was played on 22 September 2010.

Team 1	Score	Team 2
FK Baník Sokolov	1–1; 4–1 pen	AC Sparta Prague
Kunice	1–1; 2–4 pen	FK Mladá Boleslav
Vlašim	0–2	FC Viktoria Plzeň
SFC Opava	2–1	SK Slovan Varnsdorf
MFK OKD Karviná	0–0; 5–3 pen	FC Slovan Liberec
Sokol Ovčáry	2–2; 2–4 pen	FC Zbrojovka Brno
Břeclav	1–1; 4–5 pen	Slavičín
SFK Vrchovina	2–3	Kroměříž
Horácký FK Třebíč	1–2	FK Teplice
SK Hlavice	1–3	SK D.České Budějovice
FK OEZ Letohrad	1–3	FK Viktoria Žižkov
SK Slavia Prague	3–2	FK Ústí nad Labem
FC Písek	3–1	FK Fotbal Třinec
Hulín	1–3	SK Sigma Olomouc
Sokol Konice	0–2	1. HFK Olomouc
FK Dukla Prague	1–1; 3–4 pen	FK Baumit Jablonec

== Fourth round ==
The first legs of the fourth round were played on 27 October 2010, and the second legs were played on 10 November 2010.

Team 1	Agg.	Team 2	1st leg	2nd leg
FK Baník Sokolov	3–3; 5–6 pen	FK Mladá Boleslav	3–0	0–3
FC Viktoria Plzeň	6–3	SFC Opava	3–0	3–3
MFK OKD Karviná	2–4	FC Zbrojovka Brno	2–0	0–4
Slavičín	1–5	Kroměříž	1–5	0–0
FK Teplice	2–1	SK D.České Budějovice	0–1	2–0
FK Viktoria Žižkov	1–4	SK Slavia Prague	1–1	0–3
FC Písek	4–4 (a)	SK Sigma Olomouc	3–3	1–1
1. HFK Olomouc	4–7	FK Baumit Jablonec	4–2	0–5

== Quarter-finals ==
The first legs of the quarter-finals were played on 13 and 14 April 2011, and the second legs were played on 20 April 2011.

Team 1	Agg.	Team 2	1st leg	2nd leg
SK Sigma Olomouc	3–2	FK Baumit Jablonec	2–0	1–2
FK Teplice	2–2 (a)	SK Slavia Prague	2–1	0–1
FC Zbrojovka Brno	1–3	Kroměříž	1–2	0–1
FK Mladá Boleslav	4–2	FC Viktoria Plzeň	2–1	2–1

=== First leg ===
12 April 2011	FK Mladá Boleslav	2–1	FC Viktoria Plzeň	Mladá Boleslav
17:00 CEST	Dimitrovski 29'; Chramosta 36'	Report	Bakoš 77'	Stadium: Městský stadion Attendance: 1,824; Referee: Radek Příhoda

13 April 2011	SK Sigma Olomouc	2–0	FK Baumit Jablonec	Olomouc
16:30 CEST	Hořava 51'; Šultes 66'	Report		Stadium: Andrův stadion Attendance: 1,810; Referee: Libor Kovařík

13 April 2011	FC Zbrojovka Brno	1–2	Kroměříž	Brno
18:00 CEST	Simerský 88'	Report	Janča 43'; Hromek 46'	Stadium: Městský fotbalový stadion Srbská; Attendance: 515; Referee: Radek Matějek

14 April 2011	FK Teplice	2–1	SK Slavia Prague	Teplice
18:00 CEST	Verbíř 45', 90' (pen.)	Report	Vlček 62'	Stadium: Na Stínadlech; Attendance: 2,301; Referee: Petr Mikel

=== Second leg ===
20 April 2011	Kroměříž	1–0 (3–1 agg.)	FC Zbrojovka Brno	Kroměříž
17:00 CEST	Hajdarović 86'	Report		Stadium: Stadion SK Hanácká Slavia; Attendance: 2,459; Referee: Dušan Možíš

20 April 2011	FC Viktoria Plzeň	1–2 (2–4 agg.)	FK Mladá Boleslav	Plzeň
20:00 CEST	Fillo 9'	Report	Chramosta 50'; Dimoutsos 85'	Stadium: Stadion města Plzně; Attendance: 3,041; Referee: Jaroslav Bílek

21 April 2011	SK Slavia Prague	1–0 (2(a)–2 agg.)	FK Teplice	Prague
18:00 CEST	Kisel 62'	Report		Stadium: Synot Tip Arena; Attendance: 3,383; Referee: Tomáš Kocourek

27 April 2011	FK Baumit Jablonec	2–1 (2–3 agg.)	SK Sigma Olomouc	Jablonec nad Nisou
17:00 CEST	Vošahlík 21'; Lafata 69' (pen.)	Report	Ordoš 74'	Stadium: Stadion Střelnice; Attendance: 2,550; Referee: Jiří Adam

== Semi-finals ==
The first legs of the semi-finals were played on 3 and 5 May 2011, and the second legs were played on 10 and 11 May 2011.

Team 1	Agg.	Team 2	1st leg	2nd leg
SK Slavia Prague	0–4	SK Sigma Olomouc	0–3^{1}	0–1
FK Mladá Boleslav	4–2	Kroměříž	1–1	3–1

=== First leg ===
3 May 2011	FK Mladá Boleslav	1–1	Kroměříž	Mladá Boleslav
17:00 CEST	Chramosta 34'	Report	Hromek 53'	Stadium: Městský stadion Attendance: 1,180; Referee: Petr Ardeleánu

5 May 2011	SK Slavia Prague	0–3^{1}	SK Sigma Olomouc	Prague
18:55 CEST	Kisel 35' (pen.)	Report	Hořava 32'	Stadium: Synot Tip Arena; Referee: Pavel Královec

=== Second leg ===
10 May 2011	Kroměříž	1–3 (2–4 agg.)	FK Mladá Boleslav	Kroměříž
17:30 CEST	Šilinger 90' (pen.)	Report	Chramosta 34', 74'; Kulič 68'	Stadium: Stadion SK Hanácká Slavia; Attendance: 4,014; Referee: Michal Paták

11 May 2011	SK Sigma Olomouc	1–0 (4–0 agg.)	SK Slavia Prague	Olomouc
18:00 CEST	Hořava 57'	Report		Stadium: Andrův stadion Attendance: 1,866; Referee: Jan Jílek

^{1}The first leg between Slavia Prague and Sigma Olomouc was suspended after the first half at a score of 1–1 after Slavia supporters invaded the pitch. Sigma were awarded a 3–0 win.

== Final ==
25 May 2011
20:15 CEST

Mladá Boleslav	1–1	Sigma Olomouc
Táborský 73'	Report	58' Hořava
Penalties
Řezníček (penalty scored); Opiela (penalty missed); Mendy (penalty scored); Procházka (penalty missed); Johana (penalty scored); Kysela (penalty missed); Chramosta (penalty scored)	4–3	(penalty missed) Janotka; (penalty missed) Bajer; (penalty scored) Rossi; (penalty scored) Šultes; (penalty scored) Ordoš; (penalty missed) Kučera; (penalty missed) Hořava

Stadion v Jiráskově ulici, Jihlava
Attendance: 5,430
Referee: Libor Kovařík

MLADA BOLESLAV:
GK	27	(Czech Republic) Miroslav Miller
DF	20	(Czech Republic) Jan Kysela	Yellow card
DF	4	(Czech Republic) Adrian Rolko
DF	2	(Czech Republic) Petr Johana	Yellow card
DF	25	(Czech Republic) Radek Šírl
MF	18	(France) Alexandre Mendy	Yellow card
MF	11	(Czech Republic) Ondřej Kúdela		(substituted off) 8'
MF	33	(Slovakia) Lukáš Opiela
MF	8	(Czech Republic) Ivo Táborský		(substituted off) 80'
FW	10	(Czech Republic) Marek Kulič (c)		(substituted off) 57'
FW	19	(Czech Republic) Jan Chramosta
Substitutes:
DF	26	(Czech Republic) Václav Procházka	Yellow card	(substituted on) 8'
FW	7	(Czech Republic) Jakub Řezníček		(substituted on) 57'
MF	14	(Greece) Elini Dimoutsos		(substituted on) 80'
Manager:
(Czech Republic) Ladislav Minář

SIGMA OLOMOUC:
GK	18	(Czech Republic) Petr Drobisz
DF	23	(Czech Republic) Tomáš Janotka
DF	12	(Czech Republic) Aleš Škerle	Yellow card
DF	13	(Czech Republic) Radim Kučera (c)
DF	21	(Czech Republic) Michal Vepřek
MF	8	(Brazil) Daniel Rossi
MF	17	(Czech Republic) Tomas Hořava
MF	9	(Czech Republic) Lukáš Bajer
FW	11	(Czech Republic) Jan Schulmeister	Yellow card	(substituted off) 61'
FW	29	(Czech Republic) Pavel Šultes
FW	25	(Czech Republic) Jan Navrátil		(substituted off) 67'
Substitutes:
FW	22	(Czech Republic) Jakub Petr		(substituted on) 61'
FW	7	(Czech Republic) Michal Ordoš		(substituted on) 67'
Manager:
(Czech Republic) Zdeněk Psotka

MATCH OFFICIALS

- Assistant referees:
  - Kordula
  - Jiřík

MATCH RULES

- 90 minutes.
- Penalty shoot-out if scores level.
- Maximum of three substitutions.

== See also ==
- 2010–11 Czech First League
- 2010–11 Czech 2. Liga
