= Sklenář =

Sklenář (feminine: Sklenářová) is a Czech-language occupational surname, literally meaning glazier. Sklenár/Sklenárová are the Slovak-language versions and Szklenár is the Hungarian variant.

The surname may refer to:

- Brandon Sklenar (born 1990), American actor
- Jakub Sklenář (disambiguation):
  - Jakub Sklenář (footballer) (born 1990), Czech footballer
  - Jakub Sklenář (ice hockey) (born 1988), Czech ice hockey player
- Jason Sklenar (born 1970), British biathlete
- Juraj Sklenár (1745–1790), Slovak historian and Catholic priest
- Martin Sklenár (born 1980), Slovak civil servant, Minister of Defence
- Volker Sklenar (1944–2025), German politician
- Zdeněk Sklenář, Czechoslovak slalom canoeist
- Otilie Sklenářová-Malá (1844–1912), Czech actress
