= Vápno =

Vápno may refer to places in the Czech Republic:

- Vápno (Pardubice District), a municipality and village in the Pardubice Region
- Vápno, a village and part of Hlavice in the Liberec Region
