= Hromek =

Hromek (Czech feminine: Hromková) is a Czech surname. Notable people with the name include:

- Jan Hromek (born 1989), Czech footballer
- Jon Hromek, Canadian politician
