= Radim Nečas (footballer, born 1988) =

Czech footballer

Personal information
- Date of birth: 12 January 1988 (age 38)
- Place of birth: Czechoslovakia
- Height: 1.75 m (5 ft 9 in)
- Position: Forward

Team information
- Current team: FK Pardubice

Senior career*
Years	Team	Apps	(Gls)
2006	Slavia Prague	4	(0)
2007–2010	Mladá Boleslav	8	(0)
2008	→ Dukla Prague (loan)		
2010	→ Slovácko (loan)	5	(0)
2010–	Dukla Prague	9	(1)
2012	→ Vlašim (loan)	5	(1)
2013–	→ FK Pardubice (loan)	0	(0)

International career^{‡}
2004–2005	Czech Republic U17	5	(0)
2005–2006	Czech Republic U18	7	(3)
2006–2007	Czech Republic U19	11	(2)
2010	Czech Republic U21	1	(0)
- * Club domestic league appearances and goals as of 31 December 2012 ‡ National team caps and goals as of 19 March 2011

Radim Nečas (born 12 January 1988) is a Czech footballer who plays for FK Pardubice, on loan from FK Dukla Prague. He has represented his country at under-21 level.

== Career ==
=== Early career ===
Nečas made his Gambrinus liga debut for Slavia Prague in August 2006 as a substitute in a match against Teplice. He went on to make a total of four league appearances for Slavia, all as a substitute.

Nečas joined Mladá Boleslav from Slavia in January 2007, signing a four-year contract.

Having failed to make a single league appearance for Boleslav in his first year, Nečas moved to Czech 2. Liga side Dukla Prague on loan in January 2008. Nečas did not make his league debut for Boleslav until August 2008, when he appeared as a substitute against Sparta. He made a total of seven league appearances for Boleslav, all as a substitute, in the 2008–09 Gambrinus liga.

The following season, Nečas played just 20 minutes of first-team football before the end of the year, coming on as a substitute against Baník Ostrava. He moved on loan to Slovácko in February 2010 until the end of the season, where he made five appearances including his first Gambrinus liga start. During this time he also made his debut for the Czech Republic under-21 team. However, he was one of eight players released by Slovácko at the end of the season.

=== Dukla ===
In July 2010, Nečas moved to Dukla permanently. In the 2010–11 season Nečas was limited to seven league appearances, all as a substitute. However, he did score his first goal for Dukla in April 2011 against Sparta Prague B after coming on as a 54th-minute substitute. Dukla finished the season as winners of the 2010–11 Czech 2. Liga and were promoted to the Gambrinus liga.

In the first half of the 2011–12 Gambrinus liga, Nečas found it difficult to break into the starting line up, making just two substitute appearances. In the winter break he moved to Vlašim on loan for the remainder of the season.

== Personal life ==
He is the son of Radim Nečas, a former national team player.
