= Sports Hall STARS Třinec =

Sports hall in Třinec, Czech Republic

- Sportovní hala STARS Třinec
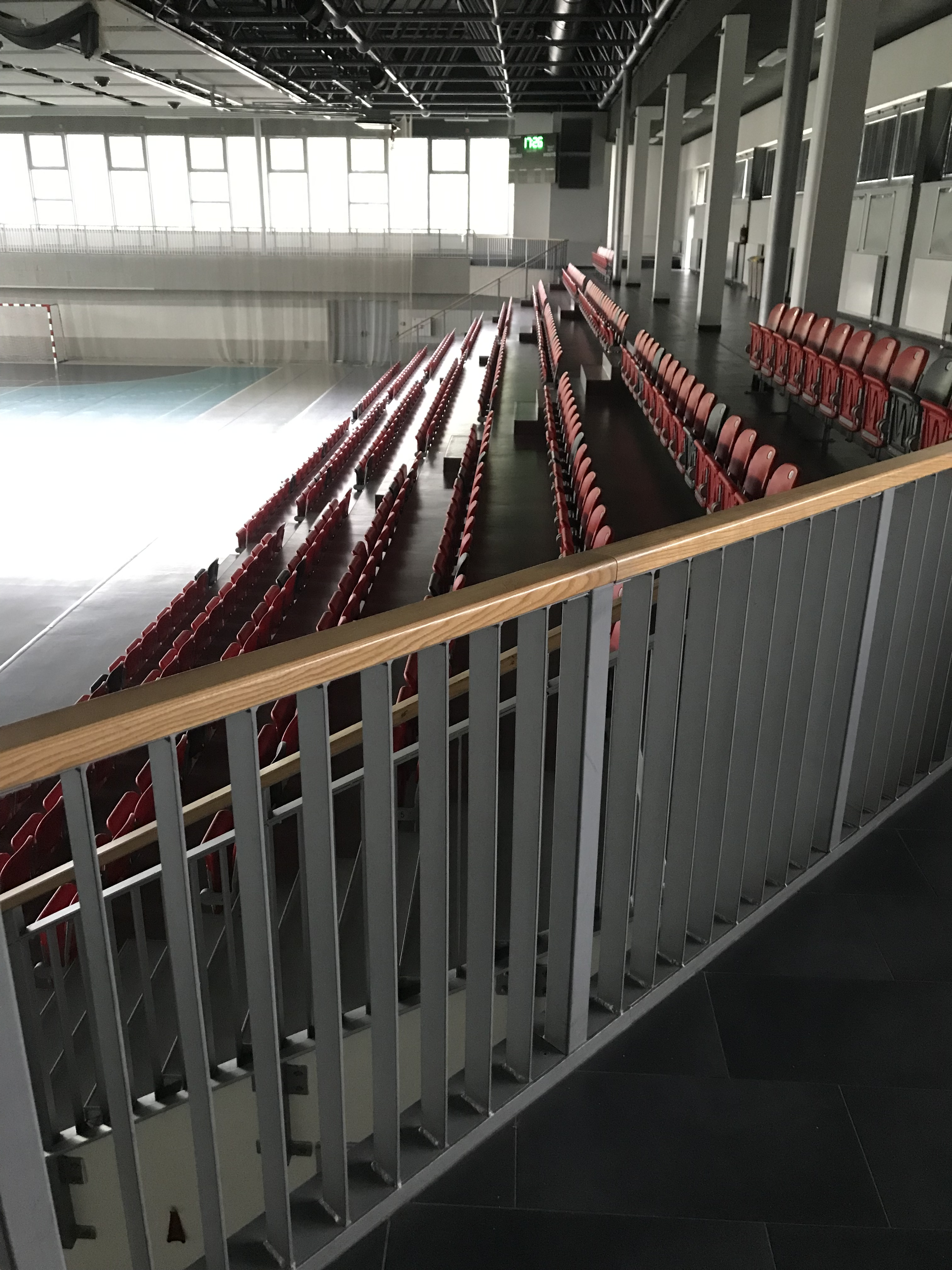
- Interactive map of Sports Hall STARS Třinec
- Address: Třinec; Czech Republic
- Location: Tyršova, Třinec, Czech Republic
- Coordinates: 49°40′14″N 18°40′6″E
- Operator: FBC Třinec
- Capacity: 900
- Field size: 40 m × 36 m (131 ft × 118 ft)

Construction
- Built: 2014

Tenant
- FBC Třinec (2014–present)

Sports Hall STARS Třinec is a sports hall in Třinec, Czech Republic. The hall has a capacity of 900 spectators. The floorball club FBC Třinec uses it for its home matches, and other clubs in the vicinity from the 2023–24 season. It was used for home matches by the futsal club SKP Ocel Třinec, which, however, ceased its activities during the COVID-19 pandemic. Many various company events and balls are also held here.

== Description ==
The hall has a capacity of 900 spectators, of which 400 can be seated, as well as a buffet. The hall also has 10 changing rooms and other facilities. The hall meets the parameters for the Livesport Superliga and ČEZ Extraliga. In 2013–2014, thanks to extensive reconstruction, the hall got a completely new look, the already inadequate facilities were modernized to meet today's demands.

== STARS Třinec ==
The hall belongs to the sports complex under the auspices of the organization STARS Třinec (full name: Administration of Sports and Recreational Services of the City of Třinec). In addition to the hall, the complex also has a weightlifting hall, a gymnastics gym, a wrestling hall, a swimming pool, saunas, gyms, Thai boxing gyms.

The organization also takes care of Městský stadion Třinec, Stadion Rudolfa Labaje, the artificial grass field, the Stadion na Borku and the forest park.
