= Ivan Hašek (footballer, born 1987) =

Czech footballer

Personal information
- Date of birth: 30 August 1987 (age 39)
- Place of birth: Czechoslovakia
- Height: 1.70 m (5 ft 7 in)
- Position: Midfielder

Senior career*
Years	Team	Apps	(Gls)
2007–2010	Bohemians 1905	23	(0)
2010	Čáslav	6	(0)
2011	Sparta Prague B	11	(1)
- * Club domestic league appearances and goals

Ivan Hašek (born 30 August 1987) is a Czech former footballer who played as a midfielder.

== Personal life ==
Hašek comes from a sporting family. His father Ivan Hašek is a famous Czech footballer, who played for and later managed the national team, while his older brother, Pavel, also played in the Czech First League.
