= 2010–11 Czech 2. Liga =

2. česká fotbalová liga
- Season: 2010–11
- Champions: FK Dukla Prague
- Promoted: FK Dukla Prague; Viktoria Žižkov
- Relegated: Kladno; Hlučín
- Matches: 240
- Goals: 649 (2.7 per match)
- Top goalscorer: Dani Chigou (19)
- Biggest home win: Jihlava 6–1 Čáslav; FK Dukla Prague 5–0 Čáslav; Karviná 5–0 Čáslav
- Biggest away win: Hlučín 0–5 Vlašim
- Highest scoring: Kladno 5–3 Most

The 2010–11 Czech 2. Liga was the 18th season of the 2. česká fotbalová liga, the second tier of the Czech football league. The season began on 30 July 2010 and ended on 11 June 2011. The winter break was scheduled between 6 November 2010 and 5 March 2011.

FK Dukla Prague secured the 2. Liga title on 27 May 2011. Viktoria Žižkov were confirmed as the second team to gain promotion to the Czech First League on 4 June 2011. Hlučín, finishing last, were the first team to be relegated. Kladno were relegated in 15th position, their second consecutive relegation, on 4 June 2011.

== Team changes ==
=== From 2. Liga ===
Promoted to Czech First League

- FC Hradec Králové
- FK Ústí nad Labem

Relegated to Moravian-Silesian Football League

- FC Vítkovice
- SFC Opava

=== To 2. Liga ===
Relegated from Czech First League

- SK Kladno
- FC Bohemians (Note: FC Bohemians were replaced by Varnsdorf due to Bohemians being refused a license to play at this level.)

Promoted from Bohemian Football League

- FK Spartak MAS Sezimovo Ústí
- SK Slovan Varnsdorf

Promoted from Moravian-Silesian Football League

- 1. SC Znojmo

== Team overview ==
Location of clubs in the 2010–11 2. Liga

Club	Location	Stadium	Capacity	2009-10 Position
Čáslav	Čáslav	Stadion pod Hrádkem	2,575	14th
FK Dukla Prague	Prague	Stadion Juliska	18,000	6th
Hlučín	Hlučín	Městský stadion	2,380	13th
Jihlava	Jihlava	Stadion v Jiráskově ulici	4,075	4th
Karviná	Karviná	Městský stadion	8,000	8th
Kladno	Kladno	Stadion Františka Kloze	4,000	15th in Czech First League
Most	Most	Fotbalový stadion Josefa Masopusta	7,500	11th
Sezimovo Ústí	Sezimovo Ústí	Sportovní areál Soukeník	900	1st in ČFL
Sokolov	Sokolov	Stadion FK Baník Sokolov	5,000	10th
Sparta Prague B	Prague	Na Chvalech	3,400	12th
Třinec	Třinec	Stadion Rudolfa Labaje	2,200	9th
Varnsdorf	Varnsdorf	Městský stadion v Kotlině	5,000	6th in ČFL
Viktoria Žižkov	Prague	FK Viktoria Stadion	5,600	5th
Vlašim	Vlašim	Stadion Kollárova ulice	6,000	7th
Zlín	Zlín	Letná Stadion	6,375	3rd
Znojmo	Znojmo	Městský stadion	5,000	1st in MSFL

== League table ==
Pos	Team	Pld	W	D	L	GF	GA	GD	Pts	Promotion or relegation
1	Dukla Prague (C, P)	30	18	9	3	55	18	+37	63	Promotion to 2011–12 1. Liga
2	Viktoria Žižkov (P)	30	16	7	7	44	31	+13	55	Promotion to 2011–12 1. Liga
3	Jihlava	30	15	8	7	49	29	+20	53	
4	Karviná	30	13	7	10	42	36	+6	46	
5	Třinec	30	12	8	10	32	34	−2	44	
6	Sokolov	30	12	7	11	53	51	+2	43	
7	Vlašim	30	12	6	12	38	32	+6	42	
8	Čáslav	30	11	8	11	37	48	−11	41	
9	Sezimovo Ústí	30	11	7	12	42	40	+2	40	
10	Sparta Prague B	30	11	6	13	35	47	−12	39	
11	Tescoma Zlín	30	11	5	14	46	45	+1	38	
12	Most	30	10	7	13	35	46	−11	37 (Note: MOS 1–1 VAR; VAR 1–2 MOS)	
13	Varnsdorf	30	10	7	13	33	38	−5	37	
14	Znojmo	30	10	6	14	30	40	−10	36	
15	Kladno (R)	30	8	7	15	42	48	−6	31	Relegation to 2011–12 ČFL
16	Hlučín (R)	30	6	3	21	36	66	−30	21	Relegation to 2011–12 MSFL

Source: The Football Association of the Czech Republic
Rules for classification: 1) points; 2) head-to-head points; 3) head-to-head goal difference; 4) head-to-head goals scored; 5) goal difference; 6) number of goals scored.
(C) Champions; (P) Promoted; (R) Relegated

== Results ==
Home \ Away	SOK	ZLI	CAS	SPA	JIH	VŽI	TRI	KAR	MOS	HLU	VLA	VDF	ZNO	DUK	KLA	SEZ
Sokolov		2–3	0–2	2–2	2–1	2–1	2–2	1–0	2–0	4–2	3–1	1–3	1–2	3–3	4–2	5–1
Tescoma Zlín	4–0		1–0	5–0	1–4	0–1	1–0	4–1	4–1	2–2	1–1	3–2	1–2	0–0	2–1	2–0
Čáslav	3–0	2–0		1–1	1–1	1–1	4–1	1–1	0–1	3–2	2–1	2–0	0–0	0–2	3–1	1–1
Sparta Prague B	0–1	2–0	4–1		2–0	2–1	1–2	0–1	2–1	1–0	1–0	1–2	1–0	0–3	2–1	1–1
Jihlava	2–1	1–1	6–1	5–1		3–3	0–0	2–0	1–1	3–1	1–0	1–0	2–0	0–0	2–1	2–1
Viktoria Žižkov	1–0	1–0	0–1	3–1	0–0		1–2	1–0	1–1	1–1	0–1	2–0	2–1	2–1	0–2	2–0
Třinec	2–2	2–1	2–0	3–0	1–0	1–4		0–0	1–2	1–0	0–0	2–1	0–3	1–1	2–0	1–0
Karviná	0–0	4–3	5–0	2–1	2–1	1–2	2–1		4–0	3–1	0–0	2–0	3–3	1–1	0–2	2–0
Most	0–2	3–1	1–0	1–1	1–0	0–1	0–0	2–1		3–0	2–3	1–1	0–1	1–1	2–2	2–3
Hlučín	3–2	2–1	1–2	2–3	2–3	3–4	1–3	1–3	1–2		0–5	2–0	0–0	2–1	3–2	1–3
Vlašim	0–1	3–1	2–3	2–2	0–1	0–1	0–1	4–1	2–0	2–0		1–0	2–1	2–1	2–3	2–1
Varnsdorf	1–1	0–1	3–1	2–0	0–0	3–3	2–0	2–0	1–2	3–2	0–0		2–0	0–0	1–1	3–1
Znojmo	2–5	1–1	1–1	2–1	0–4	0–1	2–0	0–1	0–1	1–0	3–0	0–1		0–3	2–0	1–4
Dukla Prague	1–0	2–0	5–0	2–0	3–1	1–1	2–0	3–1	2–0	2–0	1–0	4–0	2–0		3–1	1–1
Kladno	3–3	2–0	3–0	0–0	1–2	1–3	1–1	0–1	5–3	3–0	1–1	1–0	0–1	0–2		1–2
Sezimovo Ústí	4–1	3–2	1–1	1–2	2–0	2–0	1–0	0–0	3–1	0–1	0–1	3–0	1–1	1–2	1–1	

Source: The Football Association of the Czech Republic
Legend: Blue = home team win; Yellow = draw; Red = away team win.

== Top goalscorers ==
Final standings.

Rank	Scorer	Club	Goals
1	(Cameroon) Dani Chigou	Dukla Prague	19
2	(Serbia) Miroslav Marković	Viktoria Žižkov	17
3	(Czech Republic) Miroslav Podrazký	Sokolov	12
3	(Czech Republic) Miloslav Strnad	Vlašim	12
5	(Czech Republic) Filip Dort	Jihlava	11
5	(Czech Republic) Petr Wojnar	Kladno	11
5	(Czech Republic) Jiří Mlika	Sokolov	11

== See also ==
- 2010–11 Czech First League
- 2010–11 Czech Cup
