= Laczkovich =

Laczkovich is a surname. Notable people with the surname include:

- House of Laczkovich, medieval Croatian-Hungarian noble family
- Donát Laczkovich (born 1991), Hungarian footballer
- Miklós Laczkovich (born 1948), Hungarian mathematician
