= František Hanus =

František Hanus may refer to:

- František Hanus (actor) (1916–1991), Czech actor
- František Hanus (footballer) (born 1982), Czech footballer
