= Jakub Sklenář =

Jakub Sklenář may refer to:

- Jakub Sklenář (footballer) (born 1990), Czech association football player
- Jakub Sklenář (ice hockey) (born 1988), Czech ice hockey player
