= Pavel Hašek =

Czech footballer (born 1983)

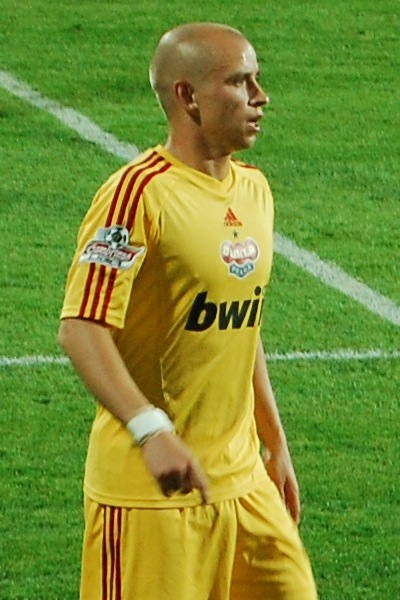
- Hašek in 2011

Personal information
- Date of birth: 27 June 1983 (age 43)
- Place of birth: Czechoslovakia
- Height: 1.71 m (5 ft 7 1/2 in)
- Position: Midfielder

Team information
- Current team: Bohemians 1905 (on loan from FK Dukla Prague)
- Number: 25

Youth career
- 1987–1990: Tempo Prague
- 1990–1993: Racing Strasbourg
- 1993–1995: Sanfrecce Hiroshima
- 1995–1996: JEF United Ichihara
- 1996–1998: Slavia Prague
- 1998–2000: Bohemians Prague
- 2001: FK Velim

Senior career*
Years	Team	Apps	(Gls)
2001–2002	Bohemians Prague		
2002	→ FK Admira/Slavoj (loan)		
2002–2004	Chmel Blšany	18	(1)
2004–2005	Viktoria Plzeň	12	(0)
2005–2006	Marila Příbram	13	(0)
2006–2007	Bohemians 1905	25	(2)
2007–2009	FK Teplice	3	(0)
2008	→ Bohemians 1905 (loan)	6	(0)
2008	→ Artmedia Petržalka (loan)	9	(0)
2009–2015	FK Dukla Prague	81	(8)
2013–2014	→ České Budějovice (loan)	9	(1)
2015–2016	Bohemians 1905	4	(0)
2016–2018	Viktoria Žižkov	35	(5)

International career
2000–2001	Czech Republic U17	8	(3)
- * Club domestic league appearances and goals

Pavel Hašek (born 27 June 1983) is a Czech former footballer, who played in the 2000s and 2010s in the Czech First League as a midfielder.

== Early career ==
Before making his league debut, Hašek played for Bohemians 1905 in the Tipsport Cup winter tournament in January 2001. He was loaned to FC Velim in the spring of 2001 while a player at Bohemians.

== Club career ==
=== Blšany ===
In 2002, Hašek signed for Chmel Blšany, where he played top flight football for two years. On 13 September 2003 Hašek scored for Blšany in the Czech First League match against FK Teplice, four minutes after coming on as a substitute. The game finished 2–2. In March 2004, Hašek was one of nine sick Blšany players, leading to the postponement of the Czech First League fixture against Viktoria Plzeň.

=== Between leagues ===
Hašek signed for Czech 2. Liga side Viktoria Plzeň in 2004. Hašek spent just one season with Plzeň, the 2004–05 Czech 2. Liga, during which Plzeň finished third and were promoted. He was released following the expiry of his contract in 2005.

Hašek joined Czech First League side Příbram in 2005, where he played for one season, making 13 appearances.

He played for Czech 2. Liga side Bohemians 1905 in the 2006–07 Czech 2. Liga, during which the club achieved promotion to the Czech First League. Following the end of the season, Hašek moved back to the Czech First League with FK Teplice in June 2007. Hašek made just one appearance for Teplice in the autumn of 2007 before moving back to Bohemians on loan in January 2008. In July 2008, Hašek moved on loan to Slovak side Artmedia Petržalka. Hašek ended his loan spell in Slovakia and returned to Teplice in January 2009.

=== Dukla Prague ===
Hašek joined Czech 2. Liga side FK Dukla Prague in September 2009. After two seasons in the second division, Dukla won promotion back to the Czech First League in 2011.

In 2012, Hašek scored his first top-flight goal for eight years in Dukla's 2–0 win against Bohemians 1905.

=== Later career ===
Hašek joined České Budějovice in September 2013 on loan for the rest of the season. After playing just nine matches for Budějovice, Hašek suffered a broken leg in a mid-season friendly match in February 2014, preventing him for playing any more that season. Following more than a year out of the game, Hašek made his professional return with Bohemians 1905. He then moved to Viktoria Žižkov, where he continued to play until retiring from the game at the age of 35.

== Personal life ==
Hašek comes from a sporting family. His father Ivan Hašek is a famous Czech footballer, who played for and later managed the national team, while his younger brother, also called Ivan Hašek, also played in the Czech First League.

== Career statistics ==
Club	Season	League		Cup		Continental		Other		Total	
Club	Season	Apps	Goals	Apps	Goals	Apps	Goals	Apps	Goals	Apps	Goals
Chmel Blšany	2002–03	3	0	0	0	–		0	0	3	0
Chmel Blšany	2003–04	15	1	0	0	–		0	0	15	1
Chmel Blšany	Total	18	1	0	0	–		0	0	18	1
Viktoria Plzeň	2004–05	12	0	0	0	–		0	0	12	0
Marila Příbram	2005–06	13	0	0	0	–		0	0	13	0
Bohemians 1905	2006–07	25	2	0	0	–		0	0	25	2
Teplice	2007–08	1	0	0	0	–		0	0	1	0
Bohemians 1905	2007–08	6	0	0	0	–		0	0	6	0
Artmedia Petržalka	2008–09	9	0	0	0	1	0	0	0	10	0
Teplice	2008–09	2	0	0	0	0	0	0	0	2	0
Dukla Prague	2009–10	10	1	0	0	–		0	0	10	1
Dukla Prague	2010–11	27	3	3	1	–		0	0	30	4
Dukla Prague	2011–12	22	1	3	0	–		0	0	25	1
Dukla Prague	2012–13	18	3	2	0	–		0	0	20	3
Dukla Prague	2013–14	4	0	1	0	–		0	0	5	0
Dukla Prague	Total	81	8	9	1	–		0	0	90	9
Career total		167	11	9	1	1	0	0	0	177	12

Statistics accurate as of match played 1 September 2013
