= SK Hlavice =

- Full name: Sportovní Klub Hlavice
- Founded: 1983
- Ground: Sportovní areál Hlavice, Hlavice, Czech Republic
- Manager: Jaroslav Dočkal
- League: III. třída, jih – Liberec (level 9)
- 2014–15: 9th
- Website: www.skhlavice.eu
Home colours

SK Hlavice is a Czech football club located in Hlavice, Liberec District. It currently plays in the III. třída, jih – Liberec (level 9) league, although the club took part in the Bohemian Football League, which is in the third tier of Czech football, during the 2012–13 season.
