= Szklenár =

Szklenár is a Hungarian-language variant of the Slavic surname Sklenář (surname). Notable people with the surname include:

- Gabi Szklenár (born 1978), Hungarian singer
