= FBC Třinec =

Czech floorball club

- Full name: FBC Intevo Třinec
- Founded: 2011
- Arena: Sports Hall STARS Třinec
- Capacity: 900
- Coach: Women: Břetislav Staněk
- League: Men: Národní liga Women: Extraliga žen

FBC Třinec (FBC Intevo Třinec after its sponsor) is a floorball club based in Třinec, Czech Republic. The team was founded in 2011.

The women's team has been playing in the Extraliga žen (the highest competition) since the 2023–24 season, to which they advanced for the first time in history in 2023. Among the team's greatest successes is the promotion to the quarterfinals of the Pohár Českého Florbalu in 2022.

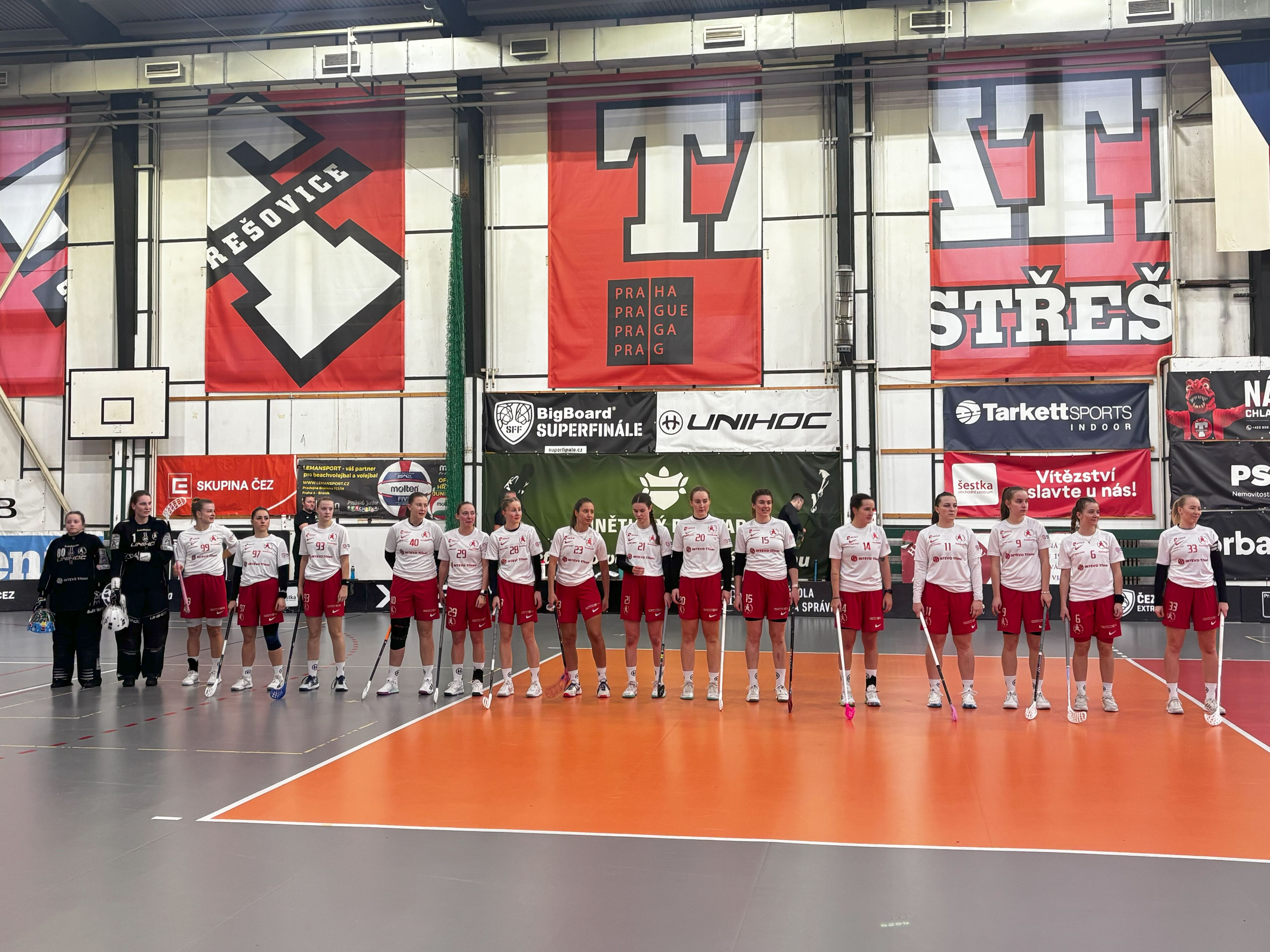
The FBC Třinec women's team before a match against Tatran Střešovice in the 2024–25 season

former logo

The men's team play in the third highest competition Národní liga, from the 2023–24 season, to which they were first promoted in 2023.

== History ==
The club was founded in 2011, when in its first ever season it entered a women's team in the 2nd league (the 3rd highest competition in the Czech Republic). In its first season, the team finished in the final 6th place, which it also occupied in the 2012–13 season. In 2013, the male component of the club was also founded. The men's team was placed in the regional class, i.e. the lowest competition, from which it gradually worked its way up to the Division (4th highest competition), to which it advanced in 2019, from the Czech regional league. The 2017–18 season was also significant, in which the women's team advanced to the 1st league, i.e. the second highest competition. The season was also successful from the point of view of the junior team, which dominated the Second league.

In the 2021–22 season, the men's team successfully managed to rebuild the squad, which included players from junior and adolescent teams, this was already evident at the Czech Open tournament, from which Třinec took home silver medals in the Open category. The most successful season in the history of the club was the 2022–23 season, when first the men's team advanced to the Národní liga mužů, i.e. the third highest competition. The women's team was also able to advance, which, thanks to the victory in the play-off over the Panthers Prague team 3:1 for matches, made its way to the women's Extraliga.

The club currently has a base of over 420 players, divided into 17 teams in 8 categories.

== Name ==
- 2011 – FBC Steel Třinec (Floorball club Třinec)
- 2013 – FBC Ossiko Třinec (Floorball Club Ossiko Třinec)
- 2020 – FBC Intevo Třinec (Floorball Club Intevo Třinec)
