= Ivan Hašek =

Czech football player and coach

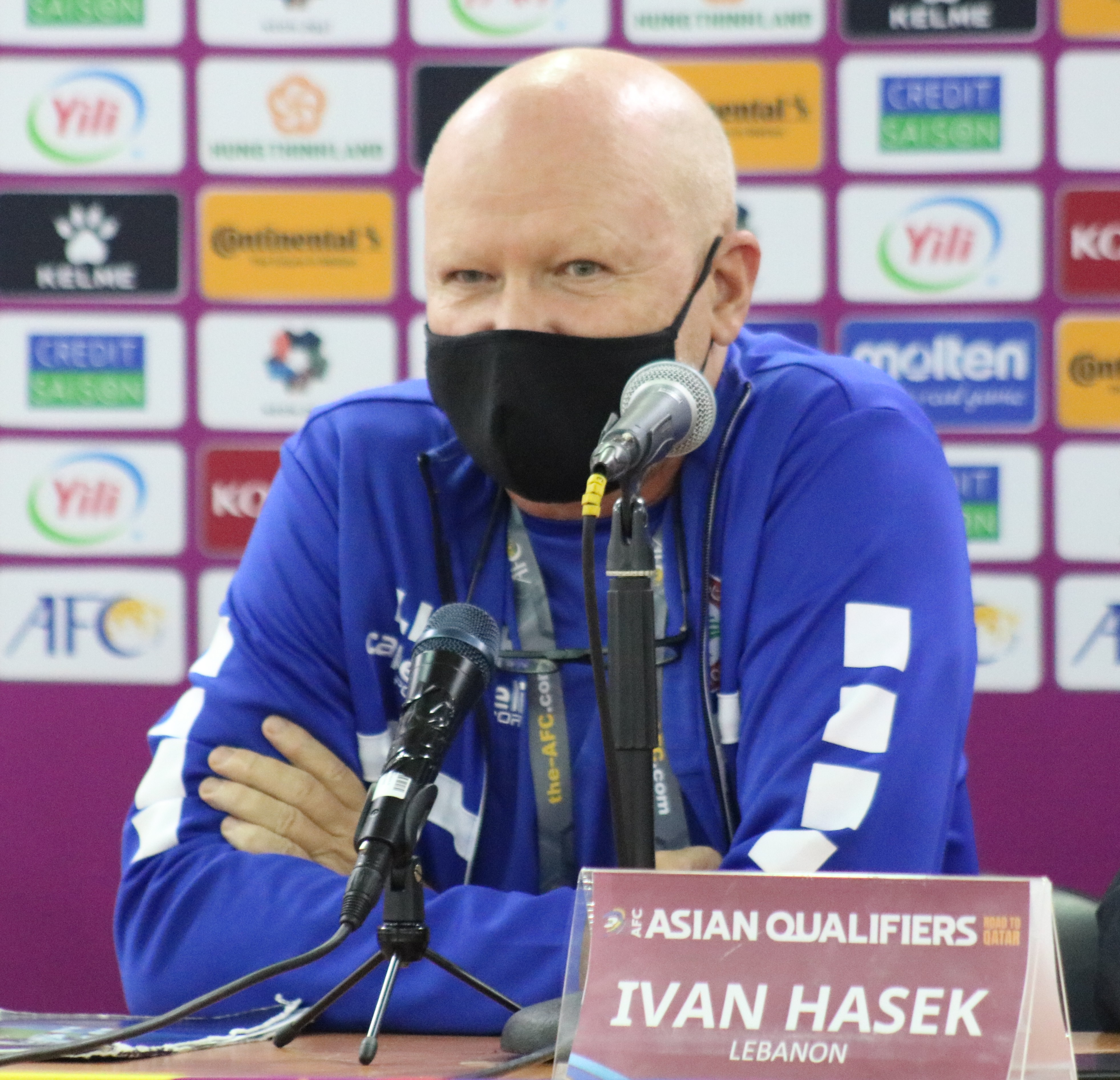
- Hašek in 2022

Personal information
- Date of birth: 6 September 1963 (age 63)
- Place of birth: Městec Králové, Czechoslovakia
- Height: 1.76 m (5 ft 9 in)
- Position: Midfielder

Youth career
- 1970–1977: ZOM Nymburk
- 1977–1981: Sparta Prague

Senior career*
Years	Team	Apps	(Gls)
1981–1990	Sparta Prague	221	(58)
1990–1994	Strasbourg	74	(27)
1994–1995	Sanfrecce Hiroshima	55	(30)
1996	JEF United Ichihara	28	(12)
1996–1998	Sparta Prague	18	(5)
Total		396	(132)

International career
1984–1993	Czechoslovakia	54	(5)
1994	Czech Republic	1	(0)

Managerial career
- 1999–2001: Sparta Prague
- 2001–2003: Strasbourg
- 2003–2005: Vissel Kobe
- 2005: Gabon
- 2005–2006: Al Wasl
- 2006–2007: Saint-Étienne
- 2007–2009: Al-Ahli
- 2009: Czech Republic
- 2011: Al-Ahli
- 2012: Al-Hilal
- 2014: Qatar SC
- 2014–2016: Fujairah
- 2016–2017: Emirates Club
- 2018–2019: Fujairah
- 2021–2022: Lebanon
- 2024–2025: Czech Republic
- * Club domestic league appearances and goals

Ivan Hašek (born 6 September 1963) is a Czech professional football coach and former player.

Hašek played as a central midfielder and spent a 11-year career with Sparta Prague, appearing in more than 300 official matches with the club and becoming its coach. He represented Czechoslovakia at the 1990 World Cup and was also president of the Football Association of the Czech Republic.

As a coach, Hašek worked with clubs in the Middle East between 2012 and 2019 before being appointed to Lebanon in 2021. He returned to manage the Czech Republic national team in 2024.

== Playing career ==
Born in Městec Králové, Hašek started his football career at ZOM Nymburk until he was 14 years old. Transferring to AC Sparta Prague, Hašek was named Footballer of the Year as the club won five league titles. He also played aboard in RC Strasbourg, Sanfrecce Hiroshima, and JEF United Ichihara. With the French club, Hašek played two seasons in Ligue 1 and Ligue 2. At the end of his playing career, he returned to Sparta Prague, where he won the 1996–97 league title.

Hašek played for Czechoslovakia, gaining 55 appearances and scored five goals. He was a participant in the 1990 FIFA World Cup, where the national side reached the quarterfinals, with him as team captain; in the group stage 5–1 routing of the United States, he scored the third. After the match, Hašek said: "We are sorry for the score".

== Coaching career ==
=== Early coaching career ===
Hašek became head coach of former club Sparta Prague in 1999, winning the Czech First League title twice in his two-year tenure. He subsequently managed French club Strasbourg, as well as Vissel Kobe, Al Wasl FC and AS Saint-Étienne. He became coach of Dubai-based Al-Ahli in December 2007.

Hašek became president of the Czech Football Association in June 2009. However, on 7 July, he became head coach of the national team until the end of the 2010 World Cup qualification. Hašek announced his resignation as coach of the Czech Republic national team on 14 October 2009 and FA president on 26 June 2011 to return Dubai-based club Al-Ahli.

In July 2014, Hašek succeeded long-time coach Sebastião Lazaroni as the new coach of Qatar SC ahead of the 2014–15 season.

=== Lebanon and return to the Czech Republic ===
On 15 July 2021, Hašek was appointed head coach of the Lebanon national team, on a one-year contract. Having finished bottom of their group, thus failing to qualify for 2022 FIFA World Cup, Hašek decided not to renew his contract.

On 4 January 2024, Hašek was again appointed head coach of the Czech Republic national football team. On 15 October 2025, Hašek was sacked after a disappointing loss 1–2 against the Faroe Islands in a 2026 FIFA World Cup qualifier.

== Personal life ==
Hašek is also a lawyer. His two sons, Pavel and Ivan, are also professional footballers.

== Career statistics ==
=== Club ===
Appearances and goals by club, season and competition
Club	Season	League			National cup (Note: Includes Czechoslovak Cup, Coupe de France)		League cup (Note: Includes Coupe de la Ligue)		Total	
Club	Season	Division	Apps	Goals	Apps	Goals	Apps	Goals	Apps	Goals
Sparta Prague	1981–82	Czechoslovak First League	14	1					14	1
Sparta Prague	1982–83	Czechoslovak First League	24	3					24	3
Sparta Prague	1983–84	Czechoslovak First League	28	3					28	3
Sparta Prague	1984–85	Czechoslovak First League	20	3					20	3
Sparta Prague	1985–86	Czechoslovak First League	22	6					22	6
Sparta Prague	1986–87	Czechoslovak First League	30	10					30	10
Sparta Prague	1987–88	Czechoslovak First League	30	4					30	4
Sparta Prague	1988–89	Czechoslovak First League	26	13					26	13
Sparta Prague	1989–90	Czechoslovak First League	27	15					27	15
Sparta Prague	Total		221	58					221	58
Strasbourg	1990–91	Division 2	29	10					29	10
Strasbourg	1991–92	Division 2	18	10					18	10
Strasbourg	1992–93	Division 1	12	3					12	3
Strasbourg	1993–94	Division 1	15	4					15	4
Strasbourg	Total		74	27					74	27
Sanfrecce Hiroshima	1994	J1 League	32	19	3	1	1	0	36	20
Sanfrecce Hiroshima	1995	J1 League	23	11	0	0	—		23	11
Sanfrecce Hiroshima	Total		55	30	3	1	1	0	59	31
JEF United Ichihara	1996	J1 League	28	12	1	0	14	6	43	18
Sparta Prague	1996–97	Czech First League	14	3					14	3
Sparta Prague	1997–98	Czech First League	4	2					4	2
Sparta Prague	Total		18	5					18	5
Career total			396	132	4	1	15	6	415	139

=== International ===
Appearances and goals by national team and year
National team	Year	Apps	Goals
Czechoslovakia	1984	1	0
Czechoslovakia	1985	7	0
Czechoslovakia	1986	8	0
Czechoslovakia	1987	6	1
Czechoslovakia	1988	8	1
Czechoslovakia	1989	8	0
Czechoslovakia	1990	11	1
Czechoslovakia	1991	2	1
Czechoslovakia	1992	0	0
Czechoslovakia	1993	3	1
Total		54	5
Czech Republic	1994	1	0
Total		1	0
Career total		55	5

No.	Date	Venue	Opponent	Score	Result	Competition
1.	3 June 1987	Copenhagen, Denmark	Denmark	1–1	1–1	UEFA Euro 1988 qualifying
2.	18 October 1988	Esch-sur-Alzette, Luxembourg	Luxembourg	1–0	1–1	1990 FIFA World Cup qualification
3.	10 June 1990	Florence, Italy	United States	3–0	5–1	1990 FIFA World Cup
4.	5 June 1991	Reykjavík, Iceland	Iceland	1–0	1–0	UEFA Euro 1992 qualifying
5.	16 June 1993	Toftir, Faroe Islands	Faroe Islands	1–0	3–0	1994 FIFA World Cup qualification

=== Managerial ===
As of 12 October 2025

Managerial record by club and tenure
Team	From	To	Record					Ref.
Team	From	To	M	W	D	L	Win %	Ref.
Sparta Prague	1 July 1999	30 June 2001	80	52	14	14	65.00	
Racing Strasbourg	1 July 2001	30 June 2003	89	36	24	29	40.45	
Vissel Kobe	1 February 2003	31 January 2005	23	5	8	10	21.74	
Gabon	1 February 2005	30 June 2005	0	0	0	0	—	
Al-Wasl	1 July 2005	30 June 2006	0	0	0	0	—	
Saint-Étienne	1 July 2006	30 June 2007	42	16	7	19	38.10	
Al-Ahli	1 July 2007	2008	8	1	1	6	12.50	
Czech Republic	7 July 2009	19 October 2009	5	3	2	0	60.00	
Al-Ahli	26 Jun 2011	8 November 2011	3	1	0	2	33.33	
Al Hilal	23 January 2012	26 June 2012	21	14	6	1	66.67	
Qatar SC	1 June 2014	11 September 2014	2	0	0	2	0.00	
Fujairah	12 December 2014	6 March 2016	36	12	6	18	33.33	
Emirates Club	29 December 2016	31 October 2017	7	2	2	3	28.57	
Fujairah	29 May 2018	February 2019	0	0	0	0	—	
Lebanon	15 July 2021	30 March 2022	13	2	3	8	15.38	
Czechia	4 January 2024	15 October 2025	21	11	5	5	52.38	
Total			354	154	79	121	43.50	

== Honours ==
=== Player ===
Sparta Prague

- Czechoslovak First League: 1983–84, 1984–85, 1986–87, 1987–88, 1988–89
- Czechoslovak Cup: 1983–84, 1987–88, 1988–89
- Czech First League: 1996–97

Individual

- Czechoslovak Footballer of the Year: 1987, 1988

=== Manager ===
Sparta Prague

- Czech First League: 1999–2000, 2000–01

Al-Ahli

- UAE Pro-League: 2008–09
- UAE Super Cup: 2009

Al-Hilal

- Saudi Crown Prince Cup: 2011–12
