= Sömmerda I – Gotha III =

Electoral constituency in Thuringia, Germany

Sömmerda I – Gotha III is an electoral constituency (German: Wahlkreis) represented in the Landtag of Thuringia. It elects one member via first-past-the-post voting. Under the current constituency numbering system, it is designated as constituency 16. It covers the northern part of the district of Gotha and part of western Sömmerda district.

Sömmerda I – Gotha III was created for the 1994 state election. Since 2024, it has been represented by Daniel Haseloff of Alternative for Germany (AfD).

== Geography ==
As of the 2019 state election, Sömmerda I – Gotha III covers the northern part of the district of Gotha and part of western Sömmerda district, specifically the municipalities of Bienstädt, Dachwig, Döllstädt, Drei Gleichen, Eschenbergen, Friemar, Gierstädt, Großfahner, Molschleben, Nesse-Apfelstädt, Nessetal, Nottleben, Pferdingsleben, Schwabhausen, Sonneborn, Tonna, Tröchtelborn, Tüttleben, and Zimmernsupra (from Gotha), and Andisleben, Elxleben, Gangloffsömmern, Gebesee, Haßleben, Henschleben, Riethnordhausen, Ringleben, Schwerstedt, Straußfurt, Walschleben, Werningshausen, Witterda, and Wundersleben (from Sömmerda).

== Members ==
The constituency was held by the Christian Democratic Union from its creation in 1994 until 2024. Its first representative was Volker Sklenar, who served from 1994 to 2009, followed by Jörg Kellner until 2024. The constituency was gained by Daniel Haseloff of Alternative for Germany in 2024.

Election	Member	Party	%
1994	Volker Sklenar	CDU	50.1
1999	Volker Sklenar	CDU	56.4
2004	Volker Sklenar	CDU	49.2
2009	Jörg Kellner	CDU	31.6
2014	Jörg Kellner	CDU	39.5
2019	Jörg Kellner	CDU	27.0
2024	Daniel Haseloff	AfD	38.6

== Election results ==
=== 2024 election ===
State election (2024): Sömmerda I/Gotha III
Notes:	Blue background denotes the winner of the electorate vote. Pink background denotes a candidate elected from their party list. Yellow background denotes an electorate win by a list member, or other incumbent. A ✓ or ✗ denotes status of any incumbent, win or lose respectively.						
Party	Candidate	Votes	%	±%	Party votes	%	±%
AfD	Daniel Haseloff	12,260	38.6	▲12.6	10,998	34.2	▲9.2
CDU	Claudia Heber	10,455	32.9	▲5.9	7,704	24.0	▲1.6
BSW					5,419	16.9	
Left	Dominic Hunger	3,654	11.5	▼13.6	3,517	10.9	▼18.1
SPD	Katharina Schenk	3,284	10.3	▼0.7	2,054	6.4	▼2.4
Greens					593	1.8	▼1.7
FW	Olaf Ehrich	1,689	5.3		517	1.6	
Independent	Horst Pickrodt	394	1.2				
FDP					336	1.0	▼4.6
APT					331	1.0	▼0.1
Familie					193	0.6	
BD					173	0.5	
Values					139	0.4	
Pirates					89	0.3	▼0.1
ÖDP					54	0.2	▼0.2
MLPD					27	0.1	▼0.2
Informal votes		780			372		
Total valid votes		31,736			32,144		
Turnout		32,516	77.4	▲8.6			
AfD gain from CDU	Majority	1,805	5.7				

=== 2019 election ===
State election (2019): Sömmerda I – Gotha III
Notes:	Blue background denotes the winner of the electorate vote. Pink background denotes a candidate elected from their party list. Yellow background denotes an electorate win by a list member, or other incumbent. A ✓ or ✗ denotes status of any incumbent, win or lose respectively.						
Party	Candidate	Votes	%	±%	Party votes	%	±%
CDU	✓ Jörg Kellner	7,796	27.0	▼12.5	6,524	22.4	▼12.6
AfD	Stefan Schröder	7,515	26.0		7,258	25.0	▲13.3
Left	Johanna Scheringer-Wright	7,270	25.1	▼3.5	8,429	29.0	▲3.7
SPD	Enrico Gropp	3,179	11.0	▼3.8	2,565	8.8	▼3.7
FDP	André Gebser	1,590	5.5	▲0.9	1,634	5.6	▲2.7
Greens	Katrin Renate Vogel	1,477	5.1	▼2.3	1,029	3.5	▼1.3
MLPD	Doris Bauerle	97	0.3		83	0.3	
List-only parties					1,550	5.3	
Informal votes		528			380		
Total valid votes		28,924			29,072		
Turnout		29,452	68.8	▲13.3			
CDU hold	Majority	281	1.0	▼9.9			

=== 2014 election ===
State election (2014): Sömmerda I – Gotha III
Notes:	Blue background denotes the winner of the electorate vote. Pink background denotes a candidate elected from their party list. Yellow background denotes an electorate win by a list member, or other incumbent. A ✓ or ✗ denotes status of any incumbent, win or lose respectively.						
Party	Candidate	Votes	%	±%	Party votes	%	±%
CDU	✓ Jörg Kellner	9,432	39.5	▲7.9	8,447	35.0	▲2.7
Left	Johanna Scheringer-Wright	6,823	28.6	▲6.3	6,094	25.3	▲2.1
SPD	Uwe Szpöt	3,519	14.8	▼3.9	3,005	12.5	▼6.7
AfD					2,813	11.7	
Greens	Michael Göring	1,765	7.4	▲2.5	1,161	4.8	▼0.4
NPD	Philipp Rethberg	1,223	5.1	▼0.5	942	3.9	▼1.5
FDP	Jens Panse	1,094	4.6	▼3.4	694	2.9	▼4.9
List-only parties					961	4.0	
Informal votes		648			387		
Total valid votes		23,856			24,117		
Turnout		24,504	55.5	▼4.3			
CDU hold	Majority	2,609	10.9	▲1.6			

=== 2009 election ===
State election (2009): Sömmerda I – Gotha III
Notes:	Blue background denotes the winner of the electorate vote. Pink background denotes a candidate elected from their party list. Yellow background denotes an electorate win by a list member, or other incumbent. A ✓ or ✗ denotes status of any incumbent, win or lose respectively.						
Party	Candidate	Votes	%	±%	Party votes	%	±%
CDU	Jörg Kellner	8,578	31.6	▼17.3	8,795	32.3	▼15.7
Left	Rudolf Ehrich	6,056	22.3	▼4.8	6,330	23.2	▼1.3
SPD	Enrico Gropp	5,090	18.7	▲4.2	5,227	19.2	▲6.1
Free Voters	Jürgen Hieber	2,431	8.9		1,701	6.2	▲4.5
FDP	Jörg Fischer	2,167	8.0	▲2.4	2,128	7.8	▲4.0
NPD	Sebastian Reiche	1,520	5.6		1,482	5.4	▲4.0
Greens	Friedrich Göring	1,322	4.9	▲1.0	1,405	5.2	▲1.7
List-only parties					183	0.7	
Informal votes		679			592		
Total valid votes		27,164			27,251		
Turnout		27,843	59.8	▼0.4			
CDU hold	Majority	2,522	9.3	▼12.5			

=== 2004 election ===
State election (2004): Sömmerda I – Gotha III
Notes:	Blue background denotes the winner of the electorate vote. Pink background denotes a candidate elected from their party list. Yellow background denotes an electorate win by a list member, or other incumbent. A ✓ or ✗ denotes status of any incumbent, win or lose respectively.						
Party	Candidate	Votes	%	±%	Party votes	%	±%
CDU	✓ Volker Sklenar	15,492	49.2	▼7.2	15,289	47.9	▼6.7
PDS	Rudolf Ehrich	8,459	26.9	▲4.6	7,799	24.4	▲5.4
SPD	Enrico Gropp	4,547	14.5	▼4.7	4,123	12.9	▼3.9
FDP	Peter Liebe	1,742	5.5	▲3.3	1,227	3.8	▲2.7
Greens	Kerstin Schnelle	1,221	3.9		1,092	3.4	▲2.0
List-only parties					2,385	7.5	
Informal votes		1,760			1,306		
Total valid votes		31,461			31,915		
Turnout		33,221	60.3	▼4.9			
CDU hold	Majority	7,033	22.3	▼11.8			

=== 1999 election ===
State election (1999): Sömmerda I – Gotha III
Notes:	Blue background denotes the winner of the electorate vote. Pink background denotes a candidate elected from their party list. Yellow background denotes an electorate win by a list member, or other incumbent. A ✓ or ✗ denotes status of any incumbent, win or lose respectively.						
Party	Candidate	Votes	%	±%	Party votes	%	±%
CDU	✓ Volker Sklenar	19,310	56.4	▲6.5	18,893	54.6	▲5.6
PDS	Konrad Scheringer	7,623	22.3	▲9.9	6,584	19.0	▲7.2
SPD	Matthias Storch	6,557	19.2	▼7.9	5,793	16.8	▼11.0
FDP	Christina Kley	738	2.2	▼1.5	370	1.1	▼2.5
List-only parties					2,936	8.5	
Informal votes		872			524		
Total valid votes		34,228			34,576		
Turnout		35,100	65.2	▼11.8			
CDU hold	Majority	11,687	34.1	▲11.3			

=== 1994 election ===
State election (1994): Sömmerda I – Gotha III
Notes:	Blue background denotes the winner of the electorate vote. Pink background denotes a candidate elected from their party list. Yellow background denotes an electorate win by a list member, or other incumbent. A ✓ or ✗ denotes status of any incumbent, win or lose respectively.						
Party	Candidate	Votes	%	±%	Party votes	%	±%
CDU	Volker Sklenar	17,125	50.1		16,865	49.1	
SPD		9,228	27.0		9,571	27.9	
PDS		4,206	12.3		3,983	11.6	
Greens		2,138	6.3		1,571	4.6	
FDP		1,276	3.7		1,248	3.6	
DSU		195	0.6		86	0.3	
List-only parties					1,000	2.9	
Informal votes		1,321			1,165		
Total valid votes		34,168			34,324		
Turnout		35,489	77.0				
CDU win new seat	Majority	7,897	23.1				
