= Daniel Haseloff =

German politician (born 1988)

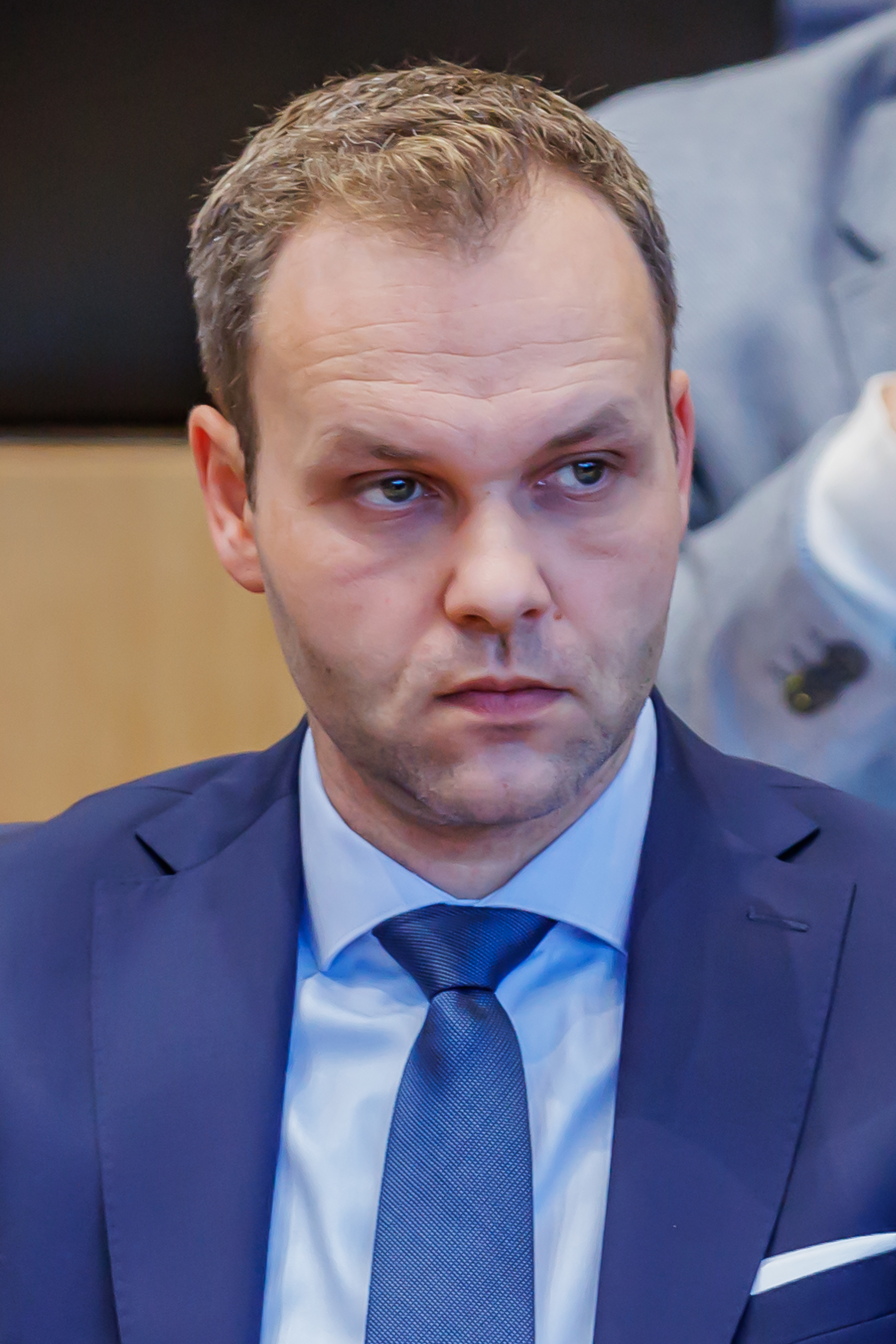
- Haseloff in 2024

Member of the Landtag of Thuringia
- Incumbent
- Assumed office 26 September 2024
- Preceded by: Jörg Kellner
- Constituency: Sömmerda I – Gotha III

Personal details
- Born: 7 June 1988 (age 37) Heilbad Heiligenstadt
- Party: Alternative for Germany

Daniel Haseloff (born 7 June 1988 in Heilbad Heiligenstadt) is a German politician serving as a member of the Landtag of Thuringia since 2024. He has served as secretary general of the AfD Thuringia since 2024.
