= Jan Kysela =

Czech footballer

Personal information
- Date of birth: 17 December 1985 (age 40)
- Place of birth: Mladá Boleslav, Czechoslovakia
- Height: 1.79 m (5 ft 10 in)
- Position: Midfielder

Team information
- Current team: SK Benátky nad Jizerou
- Number: 20

Senior career*
Years	Team	Apps	(Gls)
2005–2018	Mladá Boleslav	220	(18)
2005	→ Ústí nad Labem (loan)	20	(2)
2010	→ Slavia Praha (loan)	8	(0)
Total		248	(20)

International career
2006–2007	Czech Republic U21	8	(0)
- * Club domestic league appearances and goals

Jan Kysela (born 17 December 1985) is a Czech football player who played for most of his career for Mladá Boleslav. He currently plays in lower Czech divisions.
