= Vápno (Pardubice District) =

- Municipality
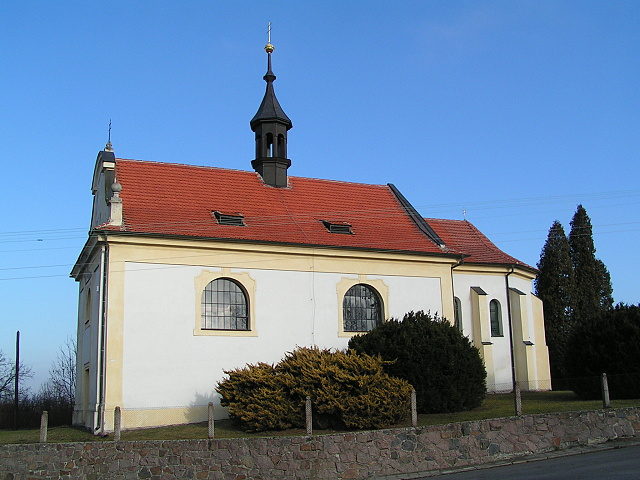
- Church of Saint George

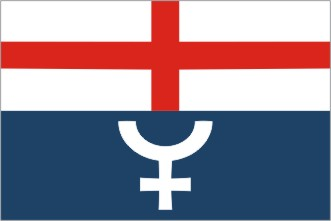
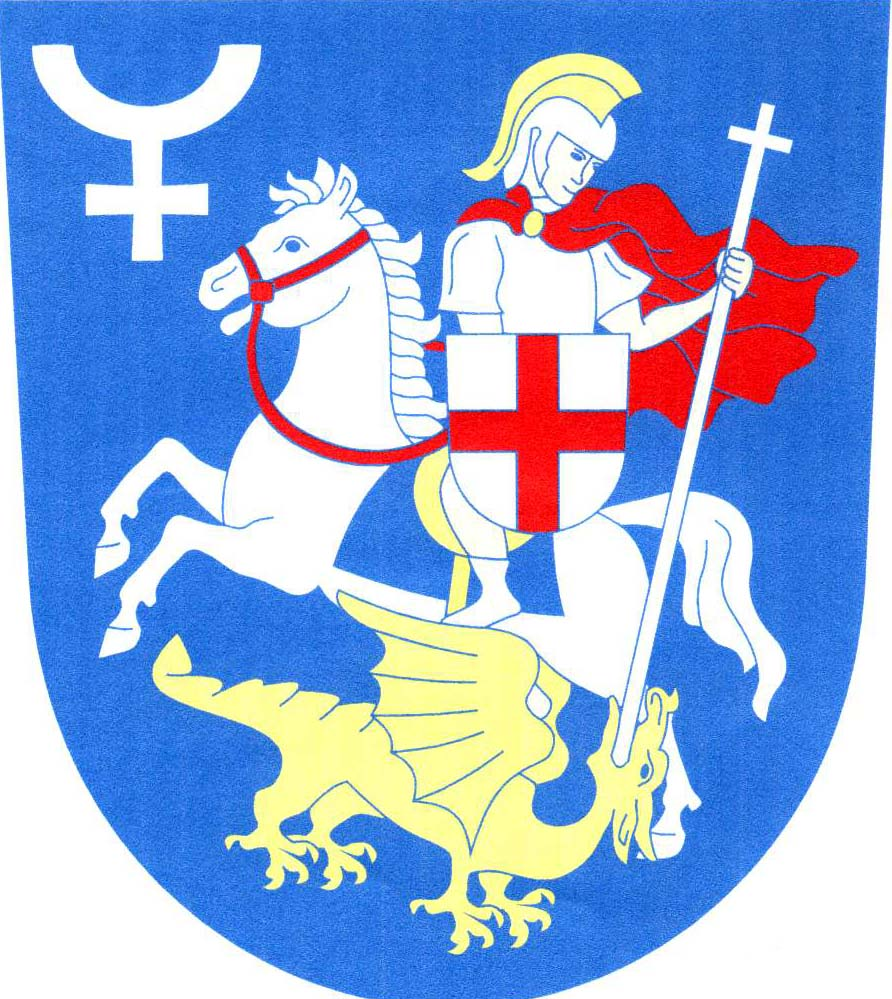
- Flag Coat of arms

- Location in the Czech Republic
- Coordinates: 50°6′15″N 15°31′59″E
- Country: Czech Republic
- Region: Pardubice
- District: Pardubice
- First mentioned: 1337

Area
  - Total: 2.66 km^{2} (1.03 sq mi)
- Elevation: 240 m (790 ft)

Population (2026-01-01)
  - Total: 122
  - Density: 45.9/km^{2} (119/sq mi)
- Time zone: UTC+1 (CET)
  - Summer (DST): UTC+2 (CEST)
- Postal code: 533 16
- Website: www.obec-vapno.cz

Vápno (Czech pronunciation: [ˈvaːpno]) is a municipality and village in Pardubice District in the Pardubice Region of the Czech Republic. It has about 100 inhabitants.

== Demographics ==
Historical population
Year	Pop.	±%
1869	229	—
1880	232	+1.3%
1890	247	+6.5%
1900	250	+1.2%
1910	228	−8.8%
1921	238	+4.4%
1930	187	−21.4%
1950	157	−16.0%
1961	150	−4.5%
1970	139	−7.3%
1980	133	−4.3%
1991	125	−6.0%
2001	126	+0.8%
2011	129	+2.4%
2021	132	+2.3%
Source: Censuses
