= Martin Macháček =

Czech footballer (born 1989)

Personal information
- Date of birth: 1 May 1989 (age 37)
- Place of birth: Czechoslovakia
- Height: 1.85 m (6 ft 1 in)
- Position: Defender

Team information
- Current team: FK Loko Vltavín
- Number: 6

Senior career*
Years	Team	Apps	(Gls)
2009–2011	FK Dukla Prague	15	(0)
2010	→ Sezimovo Ústí (loan)	7	(0)
2011	→ Kladno (loan)	12	(0)
2011–	1. FK Příbram	4	(0)
2012–2013	→ Vlašim (loan)	10	(0)
2015	→ FK Loko Vltavín (loan)		

International career^{‡}
2009	Czech Republic U21	1	(0)
- * Club domestic league appearances and goals as of 2 March 2015 ‡ National team caps and goals as of 2 March 2015

Martin Macháček (born 1 May 1989) is a professional Czech football player who currently plays for FK Loko Vltavín, on loan from 1. FK Příbram. Martin has started to play as four years old child at club FC Křivsoudov. In his fifteen years he transferred into AC Sparta Praha (U15 – U19). He has also represented his country at youth level U21. He combines sport career with study of sport psychology at Charles University in Prague. During the year 2014 he was gaining study experience at University of Jyväskylä in Finland (Erasmus program).
