= David Radosta =

Czech footballer

Personal information
- Date of birth: 12 November 1990 (age 35)
- Place of birth: Prague, Czech Republic
- Position: Midfielder

Team information
- Current team: Vlašim
- Number: 22

Senior career*
Years	Team	Apps	(Gls)
2010–	FK Dukla Prague	0	(0)
2011	→ Kladno (loan)	13	(1)
2011–	→ Vlašim (loan)	4	(0)
- * Club domestic league appearances and goals as of 31 December 2011

David Radosta (born 12 November 1990) is a Czech football player who currently plays for Vlašim on loan from FK Dukla Prague. Radosta made his first-team début for Dukla in a 2010 Czech Cup match against Česká Lípa.
