= Pavel Vrána =

Czech footballer

Personal information
- Date of birth: 13 June 1985 (age 41)
- Place of birth: Brno, Czechoslovakia
- Height: 1.88 m (6 ft 2 in)
- Position: Forward

Senior career*
Years	Team	Apps	(Gls)
2005–2009	Brno	20	(2)
2006	→ Slovácko (loan)	15	(1)
2007–2008	→ Nitra (loan)	16	(1)
2009	→ 1. HFK Olomouc (loan)	10	(4)
2009–2011	Dukla Prague	36	(6)
2011	→ Karviná (loan)	13	(6)
2011	Piast Gliwice	0	(0)
2012	Karviná	24	(3)
2013	Dukla Banská Bystrica	10	(2)
2014	1. FC Passau		
2014–2015	Hodonín		
2015	SC Breitenbrunn	9	(3)
2015–2016	SV Sierndorf	10	(1)
2016	FC Tulln		
2016–2017	SV Böheimkirchen		
- * Club domestic league appearances and goals

Pavel Vrána (born 13 June 1985) is a Czech former professional footballer who played as a forward. His former club was MFK Karviná.
