= Jakub Hottek =

Czech footballer

Personal information
- Full name: Jakub Hottek
- Date of birth: 24 June 1983 (age 43)
- Place of birth: Prague, Czechoslovakia
- Height: 1.88 m (6 ft 2 in)
- Position: Left midfielder

Team information
- Current team: Stare Mesto (assistant manager)

Youth career
- Slavia Praha

Senior career*
Years	Team	Apps	(Gls)
2003	Slavia Praha	3	(0)
2003–2005	Viktoria Žižkov	22	(1)
2005	Chmel Blšany	8	(0)
2006	Viktoria Žižkov		
2007	Livingston	1	(0)
2008	Nitra	4	(0)
2009	Viktoria Žižkov	1	(0)
2009–2010	Ayia Napa		
2011–2012	Zemplín Michalovce	38	(6)
2012–2014	Karviná	44	(6)
2014–2016	Havířov		
2016–2018	Vratimov		
2018–2019	Havířov		
2019	FK Terlicko		
2019-2020	Vratimov		
2020	Stare Mesto		

International career^{‡}
1998	Czech Republic U15	3	(0)
2000–2001	Czech Republic U17	8	(1)
2001	Czech Republic U19	1	(1)
2004	Czech Republic U21	2	(0)

Managerial career
- 2019-2020: FK Frýdek-Místek U19 (assistant manager)
- 2020-2021: FK Frýdek-Místek (assistant manager)
- 2021-: Stare Mesto (assistant manager)
- * Club domestic league appearances and goals as of 30 May 2012 ‡ National team caps and goals as of 25 December 2014

Jakub Hottek (born 24 June 1983 in Prague) is a Czech football midfielder who played for MFK Havířov. His former club was MFK Zemplín Michalovce.

Hottek began his coaching career in 2019, when he was appointed as FK Frýdek-Místek U19 assistant manager. He was promoted to first team assistant manager in 2020.

He was appointed assistant manager of Stare Mesto in 2021.
