= Ondřej Šiml =

Czech footballer

Personal information
- Date of birth: 19 April 1986 (age 40)
- Place of birth: Czechoslovakia
- Height: 1.81 m (5 ft 11 in)
- Position: Midfielder

Team information
- Current team: Táborsko (on loan from FK Dukla Prague)
- Number: 8

Youth career
- 1992–1996: Sokol Plasy
- 1996–2006: FC Viktoria Plzeň

Senior career*
Years	Team	Apps	(Gls)
2006–2008	FC Viktoria Plzeň	3	(0)
2006–2007	→ FK Chmel Blšany (loan)	15	(0)
2009–	FK Dukla Prague	69	(8)
2012–2013	→ Bohemians 1905 (loan)	17	(2)
2013–	→ Táborsko (loan)	27	(0)

International career^{‡}
2001	Czech Republic U16	2	(1)
2003	Czech Republic U17	2	(0)
2003–2004	Czech Republic U18	11	(2)
2004–2005	Czech Republic U19	8	(0)
- * Club domestic league appearances and goals as of 30 June 2014 ‡ National team caps and goals as of 30 June 2014

Ondřej Šiml (born 19 April 1986) is a Czech football player who currently plays for Táborsko, on loan from FK Dukla Prague. He has represented his country at under-19 level.

== Career ==
After making his league debut in the Czech First League in 2006 for FC Viktoria Plzeň, Šiml was sent out to Czech 2. Liga side FK Chmel Blšany on loan in the summer of 2006. He played in the Bohemian Football League in the autumn part of the 2008–09 season, captaining Plzeň's B-team. Šiml returned to the second league in February 2009, joining FK Dukla Prague. Following Dukla's promotion to the Czech First League, he made six appearances for the club in the 2011–12 season. He spent the 2012–13 season on loan at Bohemians 1905, before moving to Táborsko on loan in July 2013.
