= Stadion v Jiráskově ulici =

Football stadium in Jihlava, Czechia

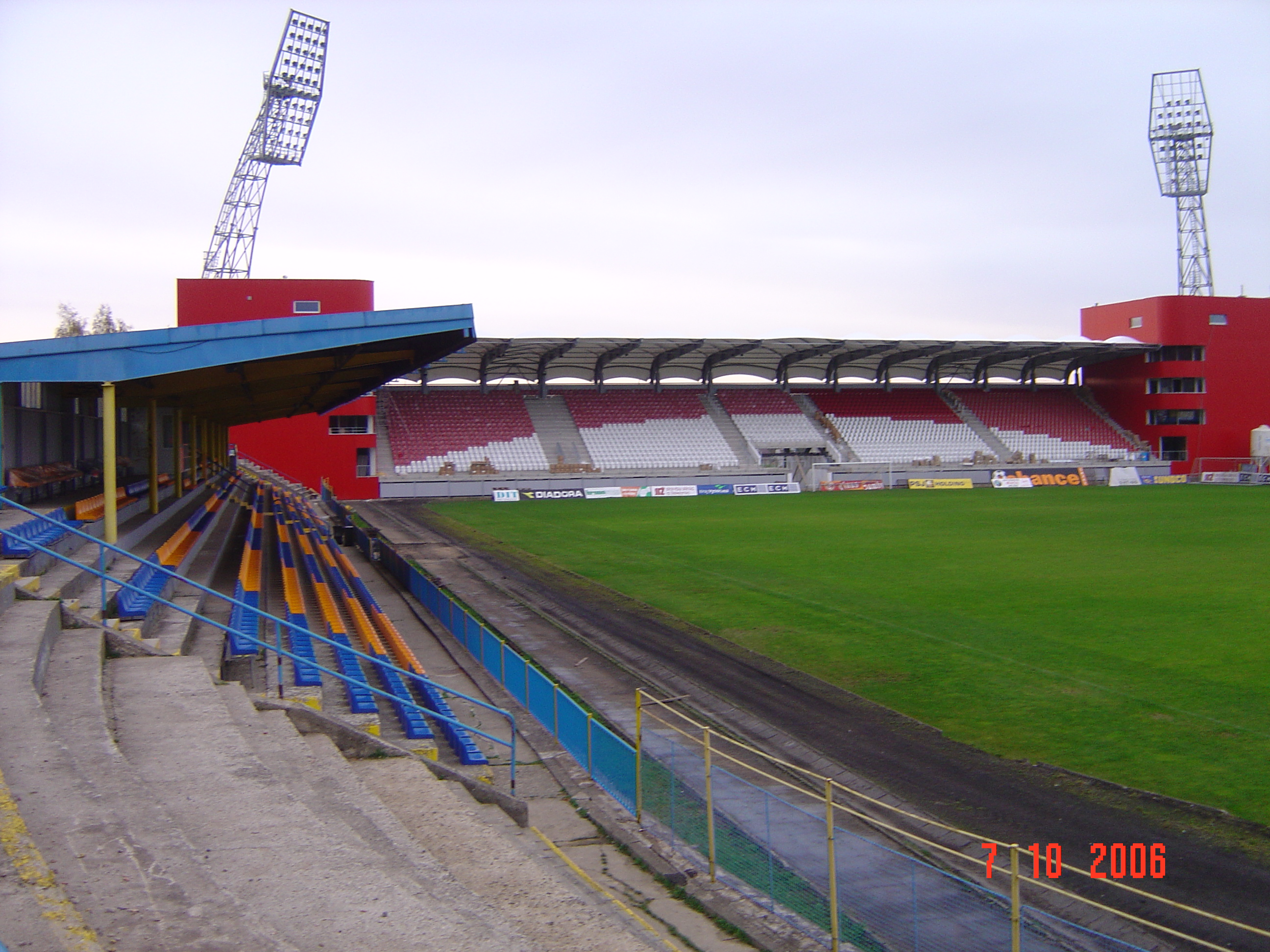
- Interactive map of Stadion v Jiráskově ulici
- Location: Jiráskova 2603/69; Jihlava, Czech Republic, 586 01
- Coordinates: 49°24′7.20″N 15°34′24.60″E
- Operator: FC Vysočina Jihlava
- Capacity: 4,500
- Surface: Grass
- Field size: 105m x 68m

Construction
- Opened: 1955
- Renovated: 2002, 2012

Tenant
- FC Vysočina Jihlava

Stadion v Jiráskově ulici is a football stadium in Jihlava, Czech Republic. It is the home ground of FC Vysočina Jihlava. The stadium holds 4,082 people on an all-seater basis.

== Redevelopment ==
After Jihlava won promotion to the Czech First League in 2005, league rules stipulated 4,000 seated places must be available at their stadium. The club were allowed to continue playing at Stadion v Jiráskově ulici for the first half of the season while upgrades were carried out. Work began on a development of the stadium in 2005, which included the installation of four new floodlight towers. Work costing a total of 180 million Czech koruna was officially completed in 2006 as the club re-opened the stadium, featuring a new 4,025 capacity. The club set an attendance record in October 2006 when the new grandstand was opened for the first time, welcoming a crowd of 3,100 to the match against FC Zenit Čáslav, which Jihlava won 2–0.

Another redevelopment was required after the club was promoted to the top flight in 2012. The club added under-soil heating in the summer of 2012 as part of upgrades to make the stadium suitable for Czech First League use.

== Notable matches ==
Stadion v Jiráskově ulici hosted the final of the 2010–11 Czech Cup, a 1–1 draw between Mladá Boleslav and Sigma Olomouc. Boleslav went on to win 4–3 on penalties. This was only the third final to be held outside of Prague since the competition began in the 1993–94 season.
