= Ondřej Kučera =

Czech footballer (born 1987)

Personal information
- Date of birth: 3 May 1987 (age 39)
- Place of birth: Czechoslovakia
- Height: 1.90 m (6 ft 3 in)
- Position: Defender

Senior career*
Years	Team	Apps	(Gls)
2008–2011	FK Dukla Prague	36	(0)
- * Club domestic league appearances and goals

Ondřej Kučera (born 3 May 1987) is a Czech former football player. He played in the Czech 2. Liga for three seasons with FK Dukla Prague, before retiring from his professional career at the age of 24.
