= Patrik Svoboda =

Czech footballer

Personal information
- Date of birth: 13 April 1994 (age 32)
- Place of birth: Czech Republic
- Height: 1.78 m (5 ft 10 in)
- Position: Forward

Senior career*
Years	Team	Apps	(Gls)
2010	SK Kladno	7	(0)
2011–2014	FK Dukla Prague	1	(0)

International career
2009–2010	Czech Republic U16	9	(4)
2010–2011	Czech Republic U17	9	(1)
2012	Czech Republic U18	10	(2)
2012–2013	Czech Republic U19	3	(1)
- * Club domestic league appearances and goals

Patrik Svoboda (born 13 April 1994) is a Czech former professional football player. He made his league debut at the age of just 15 years and 341 days.

Svoboda represented his country at youth international level and was included in his country's squad for the 2011 FIFA U-17 World Cup.
