= Dani Chigou =

Cameroonian footballer

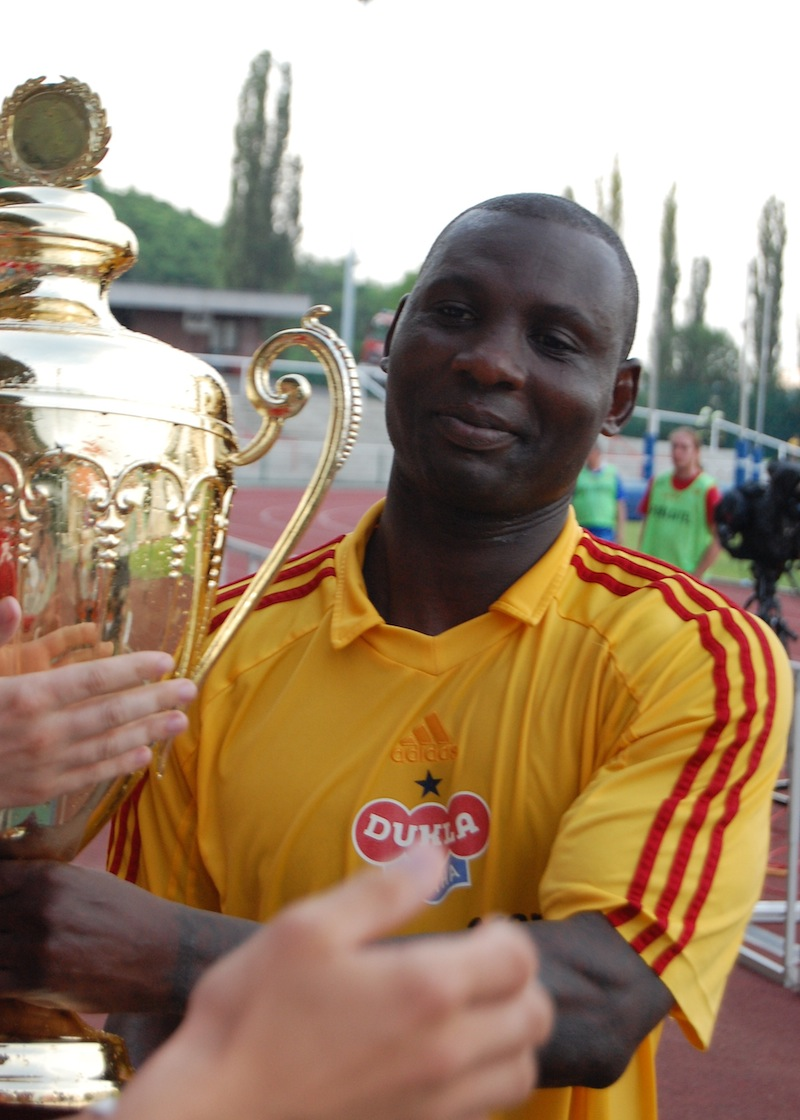
- Chigou with FK Dukla Prague in 2011

Personal information
- Full name: Daniel Chigou
- Date of birth: 5 July 1983 (age 43)
- Place of birth: Limbe, Cameroon
- Height: 1.85 m (6 ft 1 in)
- Position: Forward

Youth career
- 2000: Mount Cameroon F.C.

Senior career*
| Years | Team | Apps | (Gls) |
| 2001 | Fovu Baham | | |
| 2001–2002 | Ternana Calcio | 2 | (0) |
| 2002–2003 | A.S. Andria BAT | 25 | (3) |
| 2003–2004 | Legnano Calcio | 19 | (1) |
| 2004 | A.C. Paternò 2004 | 12 | (4) |
| 2004–2005 | S.S. Virtus Lanciano 1924 | 8 | (0) |
| 2005 | Sanremese | 14 | (2) |
| 2005–2007 | S.S.C. Giugliano | 49 | (21) |
| 2007 | Nuorese | 11 | (1) |
| 2007 | FC Farul Constanţa | 11 | (2) |
| 2008 | FCM Câmpina | 0 | (0) |
| 2008 | Debreceni VSC | 1 | (0) |
| 2009–2011 | FK Dukla Prague | 62 | (37) |
| 2011 | Volgar-Gazprom | 2 | (0) |
| 2012– | Dukla Prague | 0 | (0) |
| 2012 | →Zbrojovka Brno (loan) | 12 | (3) |
- * Club domestic league appearances and goals as of 30 June 2012

Daniel "Dani" Chigou (born 5 July 1983) is a Cameroonian former professional footballer who played as a striker. In a journeyman career, he played for numerous clubs in Italy, Romania, Hungary, the Czech Republic and Russia. He has been compared to fellow Cameroonian striker Samuel Eto'o.

== Career ==
=== Italy ===
He played for eight clubs in Italy in a period of seven years. He began his football career in the 2001–02 season in the Italian Serie B with Ternana Calcio, where he played twice without scoring. After moving on, he represented clubs in Serie C1 and Serie C2.

=== Czech Republic ===
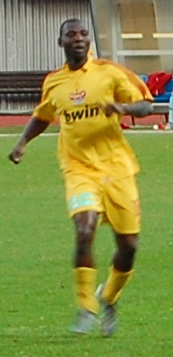
Chigou playing for FK Dukla Prague in 2011

In January 2009, Chigou signed for Czech club FK Dukla Prague from Hungarian side Debrecen. He made his first appearance for Dukla in a friendly match against SV Wacker Burghausen on 17 January 2009, scoring two goals. He opened his account in his second competitive game for the club, scoring a hat-trick as Dukla defeated Fotbal Fulnek by a club record score, 6–0.

In the 2009–2010 season he scored 14 goals, becoming the top goalscorer of the Czech 2. Liga together with Pavel Černý and Karel Kroupa.

Chigou started the following season, the 2010–11 Czech 2. Liga, by scoring six goals in five matches and again finished the season as the division's top scorer, this time outright, with 19 goals for FK Dukla Prague. Following the end of the 2010–11 season, Chigou decided not to extend his contract and left the club.

In July 2011, Chigou had a trial at Belgian First Division club Oud-Heverlee Leuven. However Chigou was not offered a contract and found himself back at Dukla at the beginning of the 2011–12 Gambrinus liga to train with the club, watching the opening game of the season against Olomouc. On 25 August 2011 it was announced he had started training at Russian First Division outfit FC Volgar-Gazprom Astrakhan.

In February 2012, Chigou returned to the Czech Republic, signing once more for Dukla, but immediately going on loan to Czech 2. Liga side FC Zbrojovka Brno.

Chigou returned to Dukla in the summer of 2012 but did not feature for the first team in the first half of the season. In February 2013 he had a trial at second division 1. SC Znojmo. Despite scoring in a 4–1 friendly win against Austrian third division side Retz, Znojmo manager Leoš Kalvoda decided against signing the player.

== Career statistics ==
| Club | Season | League | | Cup | | League Cup | | Continental | | Other | | Total | |
| Club | Season | Apps | Goals | Apps | Goals | Apps | Goals | Apps | Goals | Apps | Goals | Apps | Goals |
|---|---|---|---|---|---|---|---|---|---|---|---|---|---|
| Ternana Calcio | 2001–02 | 2 | 0 | 0 | 0 | 0 | 0 | 0 | 0 | 0 | 0 | 2 | 0 |
| Fidelis Andria | 2002–03 | 25 | 3 | 0 | 0 | 0 | 0 | 0 | 0 | 0 | 0 | 25 | 3 |
| Legnano | 2003–04 | 19 | 1 | 0 | 0 | 0 | 0 | 0 | 0 | 0 | 0 | 19 | 1 |
| Paternò | 2003–04 | 12 | 4 | 0 | 0 | 0 | 0 | 0 | 0 | 0 | 0 | 12 | 4 |
| Lanciano | 2004–05 | 8 | 0 | 0 | 0 | 0 | 0 | 0 | 0 | 0 | 0 | 8 | 0 |
| Sanremese | 2004–05 | 14 | 2 | 0 | 0 | 0 | 0 | 0 | 0 | 0 | 0 | 14 | 2 |
| Giugliano | 2005–06 | 32 | 14 | 0 | 0 | 0 | 0 | 0 | 0 | 0 | 0 | 32 | 14 |
| Giugliano | 2006–07 | 17 | 7 | 0 | 0 | 0 | 0 | 0 | 0 | 0 | 0 | 17 | 7 |
| Giugliano | Total | 49 | 21 | 0 | 0 | 0 | 0 | 0 | 0 | 0 | 0 | 49 | 21 |
| Nuorese | 2006–07 | 11 | 1 | 0 | 0 | 0 | 0 | 0 | 0 | 0 | 0 | 11 | 1 |
| Farul Constanţa | 2007–08 | 11 | 2 | 0 | 0 | 0 | 0 | 0 | 0 | 0 | 0 | 11 | 2 |
| Câmpina | 2007–08 | 0 | 0 | 0 | 0 | 0 | 0 | 0 | 0 | 0 | 0 | 0 | 0 |
| Debrecen | 2007–08 | 1 | 0 | 0 | 0 | 0 | 0 | 0 | 0 | 0 | 0 | 1 | 0 |
| Dukla Prague | 2008–09 | 10 | 4 | 0 | 0 | – | | 0 | 0 | 0 | 0 | 10 | 4 |
| Dukla Prague | 2009–10 | 26 | 14 | 0 | 0 | – | | 0 | 0 | 0 | 0 | 26 | 14 |
| Dukla Prague | 2010–11 | 26 | 19 | 0 | 0 | – | | 0 | 0 | 0 | 0 | 26 | 19 |
| Dukla Prague | Total | 62 | 37 | 0 | 0 | – | | 0 | 0 | 0 | 0 | 62 | 37 |
| Volgar-Gazprom | 2011–12 | 2 | 0 | 0 | 0 | 0 | 0 | 0 | 0 | 0 | 0 | 2 | 0 |
| Brno | 2011–12 | 12 | 3 | 0 | 0 | – | | 0 | 0 | 0 | 0 | 12 | 3 |
| Career total | | 228 | 74 | 0 | 0 | 0 | 0 | 0 | 0 | 0 | 0 | 228 | 74 |

Statistics accurate as of match played 30 June 2012

== Honours ==
=== Club ===
FK Dukla Prague

- Czech 2. Liga: 2011

=== Individual ===
- Czech 2. Liga top goalscorer: 2010 (shared), 2011
