= Josef Hnaníček =

Czech footballer (born 1986)

Personal information
- Date of birth: 28 December 1986 (age 39)
- Place of birth: Zlín, Czech Republic
- Height: 1.83 m (6 ft 0 in)
- Positions: Defender; midfielder

Team information
- Current team: Znojmo

Senior career*
Years	Team	Apps	(Gls)
–2011	Slavičín		
2011–2014	Znojmo	91	(3)
2014–2016	Příbram	57	(7)
2016–2019	Zlín	76	(2)
2020–2021	Opava	28	(0)
2022–	Znojmo		
- * Club domestic league appearances and goals

Josef Hnaníček (born 28 December 1986) is a Czech footballer who plays as a defender or midfielder for Znojmo.

== Career ==
Hnaníček started his career with Czech fourth tier side Slavičín, helping them earn promotion to the Czech third tier. In 2010, Hnaníček signed for Znojmo in the Czech second tier, where he made 96 appearances and scored 6 goals, helping them earn promotion to the Czech top flight. On 6 March 2011, he debuted for Znojmo during a 2–1 win over Sparta B. On 19 October 2011, Hnaníček scored his first goal for Znojmo during a 1–4 loss to Sparta (Prague). In 2016, he signed for Czech top flight club Zlín, helping them win the 2016–17 Czech Cup and qualify for the 2017–18 UEFA Europa League. Before the second half of 2021–22, Hnaníček returned to Znojmo in the Czech third tier.
