= Volker Sklenar =

German politician (1944–2025)

Member of the Landtag of Thuringia for Sömmerda I – Gotha III
- In office 25 October 1990 – 29 September 2009
- Preceded by: constituency established
- Succeeded by: Jörg Kellner

Personal details
- Born: 6 November 1944; Mittweida, Gau Saxony, Germany
- Died: 7 January 2025 (aged 80)
- Political party: DBD (until 1990); CDU (1990–2025)
- Education: University of Jena; Leipzig University
- Occupation: Farmer

Volker Sklenar (6 November 1944 – 7 January 2025) was a German politician. A member of the Democratic Farmers' Party and subsequently the Christian Democratic Union, he served in the Landtag of Thuringia from 1990 to 2009.

Sklenar died on 7 January 2025, at the age of 80.
