= František Hanus (footballer) =

Czech footballer

Personal information
- Full name: František Hanus
- Date of birth: 22 April 1982 (age 44)
- Place of birth: Břeclav, Czech Republic
- Height: 1.76 m (5 ft 9 in)
- Position: Midfielder

Team information
- Current team: FK Fotbal Třinec
- Number: 8

Youth career
- –: SK Tatran Poštorná

Senior career*
Years	Team	Apps	(Gls)
–2003	SK Tatran Poštorná	-	(-)
2003–2004	FK Veľké Leváre	?	(?)
2004–2005	Bohemians 1905	18	(1)
2005–2007	Jakubčovice Fotbal	44	(9)
2007–2009	Dukla Prague	48	(3)
2009–	Fotbal Třinec	70	(12)
- * Club domestic league appearances and goals as of 27 December 2012

František Hanus (born 22 April 1982) is a Czech footballer who plays as a midfielder. He is currently contracted to FK Fotbal Třinec.
