= Jakub Sklenář (footballer) =

Czech footballer

Personal information
- Date of birth: 18 November 1990 (age 35)
- Place of birth: Czechoslovakia
- Height: 1.85 m (6 ft 1 in)
- Position: Forward

Team information
- Current team: ABC Braník
- Number: 18

Senior career*
Years	Team	Apps	(Gls)
2010–2013	Dukla Prague	6	(1)
2011	→ Kladno (loan)	14	(5)
2011	→ Sezimovo Ústí (loan)	14	(3)
2012	→ Pardubice (loan)	13	(1)
2013	→ Čáslav (loan)	12	(0)
2013	→ Zápy (loan)		
2015–2016	Narrabeen FC		
2016–2017	Olympia Warriors	19	(28)
2017–2018	Hobart Zebras		
2018	Vrchovina	8	(0)
2019	ECU Joondalup		
2020–2021	Dukla Jižní Město		
2021–2024	ABC Braník		
2024	1999 Prague		
2024–	ABC Braník		
- * Club domestic league appearances and goals as of 20:12, 18 May 2019 (UTC)

Jakub Sklenář (born 18 November 1990) is a professional Czech football player who currently plays for ABC Braník. Sklenář was on the books of FK Dukla Prague for three years, although he frequently left the club on loan, having spells with a number of Second League teams.

Sklenář made his Czech First League debut for Dukla in a July 2011 match against SK Sigma Olomouc as a substitute. He subsequently went out on loan to Czech 2. Liga side Sezimovo Ústí for the first half of the season, scoring four goals in fifteen appearances. Upon his return to Dukla in 2012, Sklenář was rewarded with his first Gambrinus liga start, which he marked by being sent off for two yellow cards after 62 minutes in a game against FC Viktoria Plzeň. He finished his first season in the top flight with five appearances, four of those from the substitutes' bench.

In July 2012 Sklenář joined Czech 2. Liga side FK Pardubice in a loan deal. In January 2013 he joined FK Čáslav on loan for the second half of the 2012–13 Czech 2. Liga. Sklenář left Dukla in summer 2013 at the end of his contract.

Sklenář joined Australian club Narrabeen FC in 2015. He then joined Olympia FC Warriors for the 2016/17 season. In July 2017, he scored four goals in under seven minutes for the club against Launceston City FC and he ended the season scoring 28 goals for the club. He became the player of the year in the National Premier Leagues Tasmania and the player who scored most goals in that season.

The next season, he played for Hobart Zebras FC. For the 2018/19 season, Sklenář joined SFK Vrchovina.

== Later career ==
Since Sklenář moved to Australia, he coached the youth teams at the clubs he was playing for. When Sklenář joined ECU Joondalup SC on 18 January 2019, the club also announced, that he would be coaching the clubs U-14 squad.

In January 2020, he returned to Czech Republic, and began training with Dukla Jižní Město, before he began playing for the club in August 2020.
