= Hlavice =

- Municipality
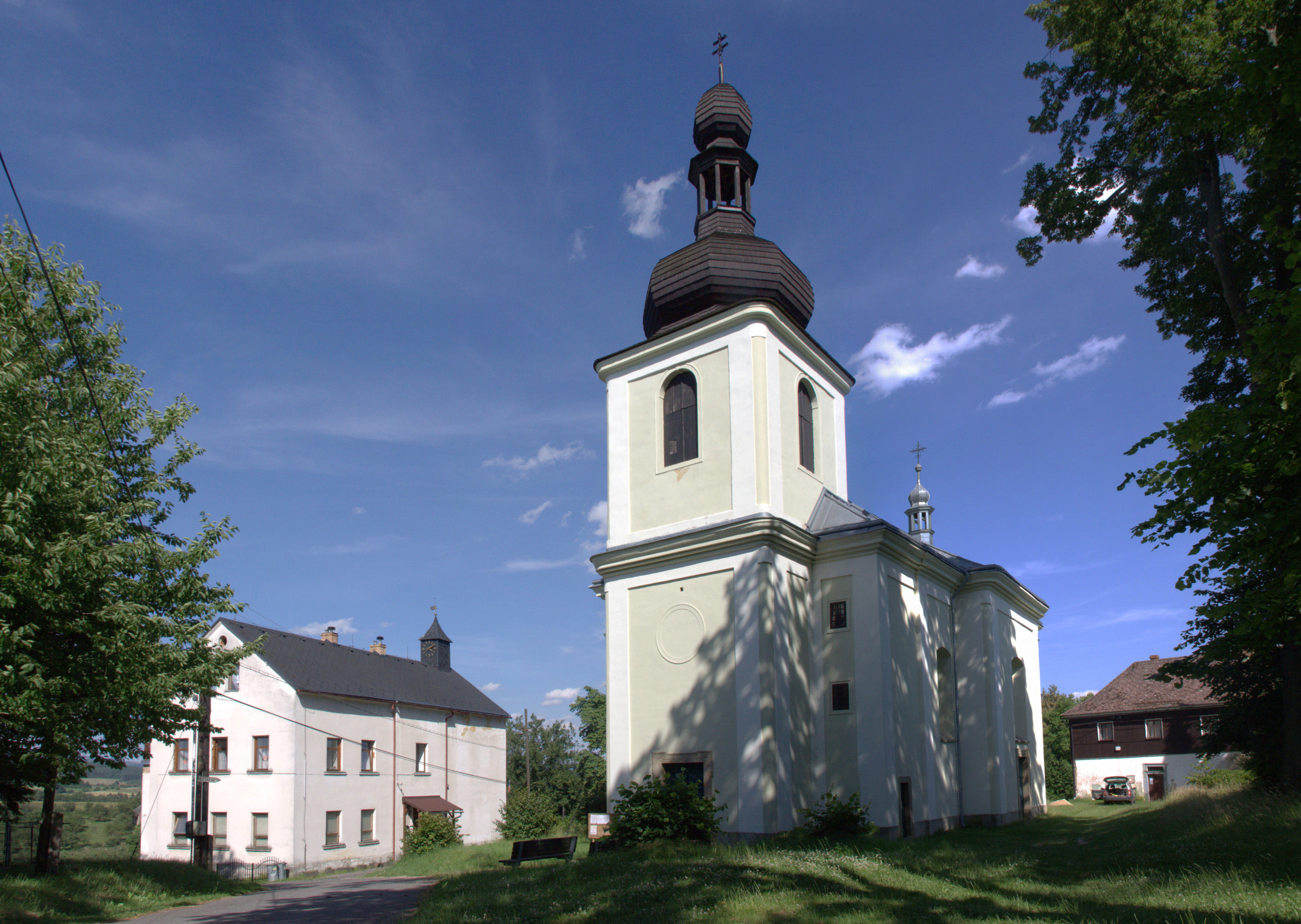
- Church of Saint Leonard

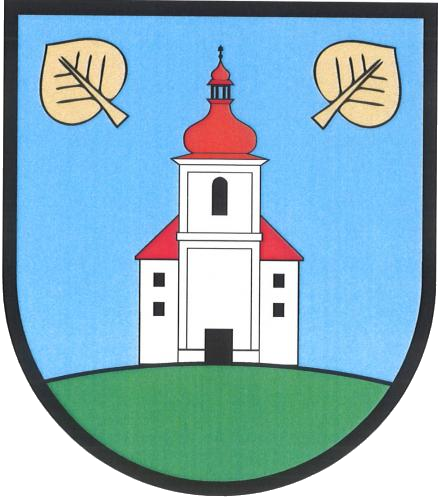
- Coat of arms

- Location in the Czech Republic
- Coordinates: 50°37′55″N 14°55′32″E
- Country: Czech Republic
- Region: Liberec
- District: Liberec
- First mentioned: 1352

Area
  - Total: 8.27 km^{2} (3.19 sq mi)
- Elevation: 365 m (1,198 ft)

Population (2026-01-01)
  - Total: 218
  - Density: 26.4/km^{2} (68.3/sq mi)
- Time zone: UTC+1 (CET)
  - Summer (DST): UTC+2 (CEST)
- Postal code: 463 48
- Website: www.obechlavice.cz

Hlavice (German: Hlawitz) is a municipality and village in Liberec District in the Liberec Region of the Czech Republic. It has about 200 inhabitants.

== Administrative division ==
Hlavice consists of four municipal parts (in brackets population according to the 2021 census):

- Hlavice (109)
- Doleček (6)
- Lesnovek (23)
- Vápno (82)

== Geography ==
Hlavice is located about 16 kilometres (10 mi) southwest of Liberec. It lies in the Ralsko Uplands.

== Demographics ==
Historical population
Year	Pop.	±%
1869	953	—
1880	920	−3.5%
1890	895	−2.7%
1900	874	−2.3%
1910	829	−5.1%
1921	750	−9.5%
1930	649	−13.5%
1950	414	−36.2%
1961	376	−9.2%
1970	385	+2.4%
1980	333	−13.5%
1991	291	−12.6%
2001	229	−21.3%
2011	213	−7.0%
2021	220	+3.3%
Source: Censuses
