= Jan Hromek =

Czech footballer

Personal information
- Date of birth: 8 June 1989 (age 37)
- Place of birth: Vyškov, Czechoslovakia
- Height: 1.77 m (5 ft 10 in)
- Position: Midfielder

Team information
- Current team: 1. HFK Olomouc
- Number: 7

Youth career
- TJ OSO Hoštice-Heroltice

Senior career*
Years	Team	Apps	(Gls)
2009–2010	Viktoria Žižkov	9	(0)
2011–2012	Brno	22	(2)
2012–	HFK Olomouc	20	(2)
- * Club domestic league appearances and goals as of 9 May 2013

Jan Hromek (born 8 June 1989) is a Czech footballer, who plays as a midfielder. He currently plays for 1. HFK Olomouc.
