= Stadion pod Hrádkem =

Football stadium in Čáslav, Czech Republic

- Interactive map of Stadion pod Hrádkem
- Location: Vodranty 1664, Čáslav, Czech Republic, 286 01
- Coordinates: 49°54′35″N 15°23′05″E
- Capacity: 2,575 (575 Seated)

Tenant
- FC Zenit Čáslav

Stadion pod Hrádkem, also known as Areál Vodranty, is a football stadium in Čáslav, Czech Republic. It is the home stadium of FC Zenit Čáslav. The stadium holds 2,575 spectators, of which 575 can be seated.
