= Donát Laczkovich =

Hungarian footballer (born 1991)

Personal information
- Date of birth: 19 April 1991 (age 35)
- Place of birth: Budapest, Hungary
- Height: 1.88 m (6 ft 2 in)
- Position: Midfielder

Team information
- Current team: ASK Kobersdorf
- Number: 16

Youth career
- –2007: Ferencváros
- 2007–2008: SC Freiburg

Senior career*
Years	Team	Apps	(Gls)
2009–2010	Dukla Prague	8	(0)
2011	→ Kladno (loan)		
2011–2012	Paks II	9	(1)
2012–2013	Soproni	9	(3)
2013–2014	Budaörs	25	(8)
2016–2017	SC Oberpullendorf		
2017–2019	SV Steinberg		
2019	Nagycenk SE	3	(0)
2019–	ASK Kobersdorf	13	(6)
- * Club domestic league appearances and goals

Donát Laczkovich (born 19 April 1991) is a Hungarian footballer who plays as a midfielder for Austrian club ASK Waldquelle Kobersdorf.
