= Stadion Rudolfa Labaje =

Football stadium in Třinec, Czech Republic

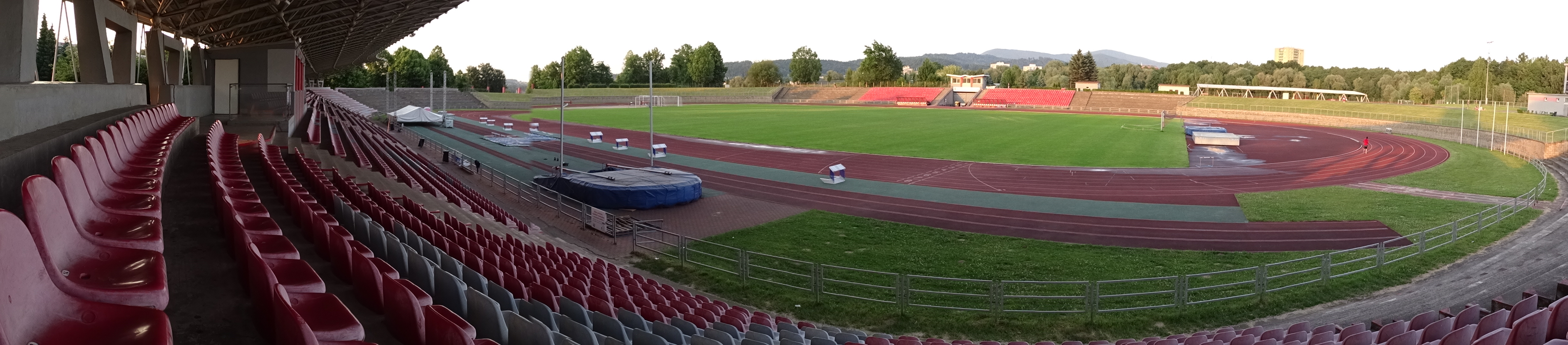
- Interactive map of Stadion Rudolfa Labaje
- Full name: Třinecký Stadion Rudolfa Labaje
- Location: Tyršova 214, Třinec, Czech Republic, 739 61
- Coordinates: 49°40′07″N 18°40′04″E
- Capacity: 2,200
- Surface: Grass
- Field size: 105m x 68m

Construction
- Opened: 1966
- Renovated: 2016

Tenant
- FK Třinec

Stadion Rudolfa Labaje is a football stadium in Třinec in the Czech Republic. It is the home ground of football side FK Třinec. The stadium is named after Rudolf Łabaj, a local Polish footballer who was a manager of the club.

It is one of the smallest stadiums in the Czech 2. Liga with a capacity of about 2,200.
