= FK Čáslav =

- Full name: FK Čáslav
- Founded: 1902
- Ground: Stadion pod Hrádkem
- Capacity: 2,575
- Chairman: Milan Urban
- Manager: Roman Kučera
- League: Bohemian Football League
- 2025–26: Czech Fourth Division group C, 1st of 17 (promoted)
- Website: www.fkcaslav.cz
Home colours	Away colours

FK Čáslav is a Czech football club from Čáslav. It plays in the Bohemian Football League.

== History ==
The first football team in Čáslav was founded in 1902 when the Septimáni school established the first football eleven named SK Stella (star) Čáslav. This sporting initiative was looked on sympathetically by a college professor and allowed them to play their matches on a military field.

The situation rapidly changed and football soon became a favourite sport in Čáslav. In 1927 the football team became Čáslav SK. This continued throughout the 1930s and was renamed DSK Čáslav, but soon after disappeared from playing altogether.

The FK Čáslav used from 2011 to 2025

In 1943 Slavoj Čáslav was founded, which in 1949 merged with SK Čáslav to create a single club called SK Kosmos Čáslav. They soon occupied first league position in the autumn and progressed to the latter stages of the former regional competition. In 1950 they participated in the national league. There was a crisis in local football which lasted until 1960 and the team was relegated from the national championship. Over time, the situation began to improve and in the 1967–68 season the team was once again promoted a division. The seventies was a repetition of the club's crisis years of the fifties.

The FC Zenit Čáslav used from 1989 to 2011

In 1989, they once again changed names to Aegis Čáslavska Záštitu Závodu Zenit s.r.o. and then again changed its name to FC Zenit Čáslav. A new element in the football club increased focus on youth, which along with other changes led to an improvement of players of the club. In 1998, Čáslav were promoted a division and again in the year 2003–04 to the Bohemian Football League, where they played for two seasons before winning another promotion, this time to the Czech 2. Liga in 2006. In the year 2008–09 Čáslav finished as second in the Czech 2. Liga and won the right to play in the Czech First League. However, they sold that right to 1. FC Slovácko.

At present, Čáslav have twelve teams playing in each age category. In addition to the "A" team, there is also a "B" team playing 1A within the regional division.

The 2012–13 season started poorly for Čáslav, winning one match and drawing two from the first seven, which prompted the sacking of manager Petr Vrabec. At the end of the season Čáslav were relegated, having spent a seven-year spell in the second division.

=== Historical names ===
- 1902 – SK STELLA (Hvězda) Čáslav
- 1927 – SK Čáslav
- 1949 – SK KOSMOS Čáslav (merger with Slavoj Čáslav)
- 1989 – FC Zenit Čáslav
- 2011 – FK Čáslav

== Managers ==
- Pavel Medynský (2007–08)
- Miroslav Koubek (2008–09)
- Přemysl Bičovský (2009)
- Zdenko Frťala (2010)
- Martin Hřídel (2010)
- Oldřich Abrhám (2010–12)
- Miloš Sazima (2012)
- Petr Vrabec (2012)
- Jan Kmoch
- Roman Kučera

== Honours ==
- Bohemian Football League (third tier)
  - Champions: 2005–06
