= 2013–14 FK Dukla Prague season =

Dukla Prague
2013–14 season
- Chairman: Michal Prokeš
- Manager: Luboš Kozel
- Stadium: Stadion Juliska
- Czech First League: 7th
- Czech Cup: Quarter-finals
- Top goalscorer: League: Zbyněk Pospěch (16); All: Zbyněk Pospěch (18)
- Highest home attendance: 6,872 v Sparta Prague (20 April 2014)
- Lowest home attendance: League: 1,238 v Slovácko (2 May 2014); Cup: 425 v Příbram (5 October 2013)
Home colours	Away colours

The 2013–14 season was Dukla Prague's third consecutive season in the Czech First League.

== Players ==
=== Squad information ===
As of 10 September 2013.

Note: Flags indicate national team as defined under FIFA eligibility rules; some limited exceptions apply. Players may hold more than one non-FIFA nationality.

No.	Pos.	Nation	Player
1	GK	CZE	Filip Rada
2	DF	CZE	Michal Jeřábek
3	MF	BFA	Ismaël Ouedraogo
4	DF	CZE	Matěj Hanousek
5	MF	CZE	Marek Hanousek (on loan from Plzeň)
6	DF	CZE	Pavel Hašek
8	FW	CZE	Jan Pázler (on loan from Jablonec)
9	DF	CZE	Jan Vorel
10	FW	ESP	Néstor Albiach
11	FW	CZE	Zbyněk Pospěch
13	MF	CZE	Tomáš Berger
14	MF	CZE	Patrik Gedeon (captain)
15	DF	ESP	José Romera

No.	Pos.	Nation	Player
16	DF	CZE	Pavel Radoš
19	DF	SVK	Lukáš Štetina
20	FW	CZE	Josef Marek
21	FW	CZE	Pavel Čapek
22	DF	CRO	Tomislav Božić
23	DF	CZE	Ondřej Vrzal
24	MF	CZE	Petr Malý
26	MF	CZE	Jakub Mareš (on loan from Mladá Boleslav)
27	MF	CZE	Luboš Kalouda
29	GK	CZE	David Tetour
30	GK	SVK	Tomáš Kučera
33	MF	SVK	Marek Hlinka

=== Transfers ===
Dukla announced the signing of Slovak midfielder Marek Hlinka in July 2013. Slovak defender Lukáš Štetina, who had spent the last season on loan at Dukla, signed for the club permanently. Youth team players Michal Jeřábek and Pavel Čapek trained with the senior team for the first time, the former going on to make his club debut later in the season. Dukla secured two players on loan during summer 2013, namely Jakub Mareš on a season-long loan from Mladá Boleslav, and Jan Pázler from Jablonec. Marek Hanousek returned to Dukla on loan in September 2013.

Striker Jan Svatonský left Dukla after six years at the club, heading to second division side MFK Karviná. Midfielder Tomáš Borek left and signed for Turkish side Konyaspor. Jakub Sklenář left the club following the expiry of his contract. Defender Tomáš Pospíšil and midfielder Ondřej Šiml went out on loan, to FK Pardubice and FC MAS Táborsko respectively.

== Management and coaching staff ==
Position	Name
Manager	Luboš Kozel
Coach	Jan Suchopárek
Goalkeeping Coach	Tomáš Obermajer
Fitness Coach	Antonín Čepek
Team Leader	Jiří Blažek
Club Physio	Pavel Hrásky, Petr Král
Masseur	Radek Havala
Doctor	Ladislav Šindelář
Custodian	Jan Švestka

== Statistics ==
=== Appearances and goals ===
- Starts + Substitute appearances.

No.	Pos	Nat	Player	Total		League		Cup	
No.	Pos	Nat	Player	Apps	Goals	Apps	Goals	Apps	Goals
1	GK	(Czech Republic) CZE	Filip Rada	32	0	30+0	0	2+0	0
2	DF	(Czech Republic) CZE	Michal Jeřábek	6	0	4+0	0	1+1	0
3	MF	(Burkina Faso) BFA	Ismaël Ouedraogo	15	1	5+6	0	2+2	1
4	DF	(Czech Republic) CZE	Matěj Hanousek	22	0	14+2	0	6+0	0
5	MF	(Czech Republic) CZE	Marek Hanousek	26	2	17+4	0	5+0	2
6	MF	(Czech Republic) CZE	Pavel Hašek	5	0	1+3	0	0+1	0
6	DF	(Czech Republic) CZE	Jan Juroška	4	1	3+1	1	0+0	0
7	FW	(Czech Republic) CZE	Vojtěch Engelmann	7	0	3+3	0	0+1	0
8	FW	(Czech Republic) CZE	Jan Pázler	9	2	4+2	0	2+1	2
8	DF	(Slovakia) SVK	Ľuboš Hanzel	6	0	2+4	0	0+0	0
9	DF	(Czech Republic) CZE	Jan Vorel	19	1	13+3	0	3+0	1
10	FW	(Spain) ESP	Néstor Albiach	18	2	10+4	1	4+0	1
11	FW	(Czech Republic) CZE	Zbyněk Pospěch	32	18	27+2	16	3+0	2
13	MF	(Czech Republic) CZE	Tomáš Berger	17	2	15+0	2	2+0	0
14	MF	(Czech Republic) CZE	Patrik Gedeon	28	1	27+0	1	1+0	0
15	DF	(Spain) ESP	José Romera	31	2	27+0	2	4+0	0
16	FW	(Czech Republic) CZE	Pavel Radoš	2	0	0+0	0	2+0	0
16	FW	(Czech Republic) CZE	Milan Černý	15	0	6+7	0	0+2	0
19	MF	(Slovakia) SVK	Lukáš Štetina	32	3	25+1	2	6+0	1
20	FW	(Czech Republic) CZE	Josef Marek	30	1	3+21	1	3+3	0
21	FW	(Democratic Republic of the Congo) COD	Budge Manzia	1	0	0+1	0	0+0	0
22	DF	(Croatia) CRO	Tomislav Božić	27	0	19+3	0	2+3	0
23	MF	(Czech Republic) CZE	Ondřej Vrzal	17	0	14+2	0	1+0	0
23	MF	(Slovakia) SVK	Róbert Kovaľ	7	0	4+2	0	1+0	0
24	MF	(Czech Republic) CZE	Petr Malý	19	4	8+7	2	3+1	2
26	DF	(Czech Republic) CZE	Jakub Mareš	24	4	19+1	3	3+1	1
27	DF	(Czech Republic) CZE	Luboš Kalouda	21	1	11+6	1	2+2	0
30	GK	(Slovakia) SVK	Tomáš Kučera	4	0	0+0	0	4+0	0
33	FW	(Slovakia) SVK	Marek Hlinka	27	3	19+4	3	4+0	0

=== Goalscorers ===
Pos	Nat	Player	LIG	CUP	Total
1	(Czech Republic)	Zbyněk Pospěch	16	2	18
2	(Czech Republic)	Jakub Mareš	3	1	4
2	(Czech Republic)	Petr Malý	2	2	4
4	(Slovakia)	Marek Hlinka	3	0	3
4	(Slovakia)	Lukáš Štetina	2	1	3
6	(Czech Republic)	Tomáš Berger	2	0	2
6	(Spain)	José Romera	2	0	2
6	(Spain)	Néstor Albiach	1	1	2
6	(Czech Republic)	Jan Pázler	0	2	2
6	(Czech Republic)	Marek Hanousek	0	2	2
11	(Czech Republic)	Josef Marek	1	0	1
11	(Czech Republic)	Luboš Kalouda	1	0	1
11	(Czech Republic)	Patrik Gedeon	1	0	1
11	(Czech Republic)	Jan Juroška	1	0	1
11	(Czech Republic)	Jan Vorel	0	1	1
11	(Burkina Faso)	Ismaël Ouedraogo	0	1	1
		Totals	35	13	48

=== Home attendance ===
The club was 19th of the 20 First League clubs in terms of average league attendance; only 1. SC Znojmo had a lower average attendance.

Competition	Average Attendance	Games
Czech First League	2,765	15
Cup	1,684	2
Average	2,638	17

== Czech First League ==
=== Results by round ===
Round	1	2	3	4	5	6	7	8	9	10	11	12	13	14	15	16	17	18	19	20	21	22	23	24	25	26	27	28	29	30
Ground	H	H	A	H	A	H	A	H	A	H	A	H	A	H	A	A	H	A	H	A	H	A	H	A	H	A	H	A	H	A
Result	D	W	L	L	D	D	W	W	D	D	L	W	W	D	W	W	W	L	L	L	D	L	L	W	L	L	D	L	L	W
Position	10	5	6	7	8	10	7	6	7	7	7	6	6	6	5	4	3	5	6	6	6	6	6	6	6	7	7	7	8	7

Source: FKDukla.cz synotliga.cz
A = Away; H = Home; W = Win; D = Draw; L = Loss

=== Results summary ===
Overall								Home						Away					
Pld	W	D	L	GF	GA	GD	Pts	W	D	L	GF	GA	GD	W	D	L	GF	GA	GD
30	10	8	12	35	37	−2	38	4	6	5	17	19	−2	6	2	7	18	18	0

Source: synotliga.cz

=== League table ===
Pos	Team	Pld	W	D	L	GF	GA	GD	Pts
5	Teplice	30	13	7	10	51	35	+16	46
6	Slovácko	30	11	7	12	43	40	+3	40
7	Dukla Prague	30	10	8	12	35	37	−2	38
8	Vysočina Jihlava	30	10	7	13	45	50	−5	37 (Note: Vysočina Jihlava ahead of Zbrojovka Brno on head-to-head record; Vysočina Jihlava–Zbrojovka Brno 2–1, Zbrojovka Brno–Vysočina Jihlava 1–0.)
9	Zbrojovka Brno	30	10	7	13	32	42	−10	37

Source: Fortuna liga
Rules for classification: 1) points; 2) head-to-head points; 3) head-to-head goal difference; 4) head-to-head goals scored; 5) goal difference; 6) number of goals scored.

=== Matches ===
==== July ====
19 July 2013 Round 1	Dukla Prague	1 – 1	Znojmo	Prague
	Gedeon 26'	Report	76' Hrošovský	Stadium: Stadion Juliska; Attendance: 2,095; Referee: Královec

27 July 2013 Round 2	Dukla Prague	4 – 0	Olomouc	Prague
	Pospěch 5', 6', 49', 77'	Report		Stadium: Stadion Juliska; Attendance: 1,923; Referee: Kovařík

==== August ====
4 August 2013 Round 3	Teplice	2 – 1	Dukla Prague	Teplice
	Ljevaković 35'; Litsingi 61'	Report	85' (pen.) Malý	Stadium: Na Stínadlech; Attendance: 5,950; Referee: Paták

9 August 2013 Round 4	Dukla Prague	0 – 1	Slavia Prague	Prague
		Report	27' Kisel	Stadium: Stadion Juliska; Attendance: 4,916; Referee: Ardeleánu

17 August 2013 Round 5	Vysočina Jihlava	1 – 1	Dukla Prague	Jihlava
	Šourek 50'	Report	57' Štetina	Stadium: Stadion v Jiráskově ulici Attendance: 2,450; Referee: Zelinka

23 August 2013 Round 6	Dukla Prague	1 – 1	Mladá Boleslav	Prague
	Romera 58'	Report	89' Nešpor	Stadium: Stadion Juliska; Attendance: 2,150; Referee: Mikel

31 August 2013 Round 7	Příbram	0 – 2	Dukla Prague	Příbram
		Report	14' Hlinka; 69' Kalouda	Stadium: Na Litavce; Attendance: 2,152; Referee: Franěk

==== September ====
13 September 2013 Round 8	Dukla Prague	2 – 1	Zbrojovka Brno	Prague
	Pospěch 43', 54'	Report	9' Marković	Stadium: Stadion Juliska; Attendance: 2,052; Referee: Kovařík

21 September 2013 Round 9	Viktoria Plzeň	0 – 0	Dukla Prague	Plzeň
		Report		Stadium: Doosan Arena; Attendance: 9,050; Referee: Franěk

30 September 2013 Round 10	Dukla Prague	1 – 1	Jablonec	Prague
	Romera 11'	Report	38' Hubník	Stadium: Stadion Juliska; Attendance: 2,024; Referee: Orel

==== October ====
20 October 2013 Round 11	Sparta Prague	3 – 0	Dukla Prague	Prague
	Dočkal 32'; Hušbauer 51'; Krejčí 57'	Report		Stadium: Generali Arena; Attendance: 7,792; Referee: Příhoda

25 October 2013 Round 12	Dukla Prague	1 – 0	Baník Ostrava	Prague
	Malý 59' (pen.)	Report		Stadium: Stadion Juliska; Attendance: 2,745; Referee: Kocourek

==== November ====
2 November 2013 Round 13	Slovácko	0 – 1	Dukla Prague	Uherské Hradiště
		Report	74' Mareš	Stadium: Městský fotbalový stadion Miroslava Valenty; Attendance: 4,034; Referee: Hrubeš

8 November 2013 Round 14	Dukla Prague	1 – 1	Bohemians 1905	Prague
	Pospěch 70'	Report	75' Bartek	Stadium: Stadion Juliska; Attendance: 4,823; Referee: Zelinka

23 November 2013 Round 15	Liberec	0 – 1	Dukla Prague	Liberec
		Report	49' Pospěch	Stadium: Stadion u Nisy; Attendance: 3,227; Referee: Proske

30 November 2013 Round 16	Olomouc	1 – 2	Dukla Prague	Olomouc
	Doležal 23'	Report	21' Néstor; 77' Hlinka	Stadium: Andrův stadion Attendance: 3,462; Referee: Orel

==== February ====
21 February 2014 Round 17	Dukla Prague	3 – 1	Teplice	Prague
	Mareš 8'; Pospěch 20'; Hlinka 39'	Report	85' (o.g.) Hlinka	Stadium: Stadion Juliska; Attendance: 1,958; Referee: Kovařík

28 February 2014 Round 18	Slavia Prague	2 – 1	Dukla Prague	Prague
	Smejkal 14'; Necid 44'	Report	87' Pospěch	Stadium: Eden Arena; Attendance: 4,939; Referee: Franěk

==== March ====
8 March 2014 Round 19	Dukla Prague	0 – 3	Vysočina Jihlava	Prague
		Report	51' Jánoš; 54', 68' Harba	Stadium: Stadion Juliska; Attendance: 2,256; Referee: Královec

17 March 2014 Round 20	Mladá Boleslav	1 – 0	Dukla Prague	Mladá Boleslav
	Šćuk 83'	Report		Stadium: Městský stadion Attendance: 3,179; Referee: Příhoda

22 March 2014 Round 21	Dukla Prague	1 – 1	Příbram	Prague
	Štetina 17'	Report	34' (pen.) Řezníček	Stadium: Stadion Juliska; Attendance: 1,550; Referee: Jech

30 March 2014 Round 22	Zbrojovka Brno	2 – 1	Dukla Prague	Brno
	Keresteš 19'; Skalák 33'	Report	41' Marek	Stadium: Městský fotbalový stadion Srbská; Attendance: 3,823; Referee: Orel

==== April ====
5 April 2014 Round 23	Dukla Prague	0 – 3	Viktoria Plzeň	Prague
		Report	18' Tecl; 50' Kolář; 59' Petržela	Stadium: Stadion Juliska; Attendance: 3,250; Referee: Franěk

13 April 2014 Round 24	Jablonec	1 – 4	Dukla Prague	Jablonec nad Nisou
	Jablonský 22'	Report	1' Mareš; 29' (pen.), 70' Berger; 90' Pospěch	Stadium: Chance Arena; Attendance: 2,058; Referee: Paták

20 April 2014 Round 25	Dukla Prague	1 – 3	Sparta Prague	Prague
	Pospěch 76'	Report	4' Kadeřábek; 18', 70' Hušbauer	Stadium: Stadion Juliska; Attendance: 6,872; Referee: Nenadál

26 April 2014 Round 26	Baník Ostrava	2 – 0	Dukla Prague	Ostrava
	Svěrkoš 42'; Krmenčík 90'	Report		Stadium: Bazaly; Attendance: 6,302; Referee: Proske

==== May ====
2 May 2014 Round 27	Dukla Prague	1 – 1	Slovácko	Prague
	Pospěch 85'	Report	89' Petr	Stadium: Stadion Juliska; Attendance: 1,238; Referee: Jílek

9 May 2014 Round 28	Bohemians 1905	3 – 2	Dukla Prague	Prague
	Šmíd 22'; Jindřišek 29'; Nerad 41'	Report	59' Pospěch; 64' Juroška	Stadium: Ďolíček; Attendance: 3,459; Referee: Kovařík

25 May 2014 Round 29	Dukla Prague	0 – 1	Liberec	Prague
		Report	38' Pavelka	Stadium: Stadion Juliska; Attendance: 1,624; Referee: Královec

31 May 2014 Round 30	Znojmo	0 – 2	Dukla Prague	Jihlava
		Report	38' (pen.), 45' (pen.) Pospěch	Stadium: Stadion v Jiráskově ulici Attendance: 155; Referee: Kovařík

== Cup ==
As a First League team, Dukla entered the Cup at the second round stage. In the second round, Dukla faced third league side Štěchovice, where they ran out 4–1 winners. The third round match at second league side Třinec was more difficult; Marek Hanousek put Dukla ahead before Třinec equalised late in the game, to send the match to a penalty shootout. Matěj Hanousek scored the deciding penalty as Dukla went through 7–6 on penalties.

In the fourth round, Dukla faced First League opposition for the first time, being paired with Příbram. Dukla won both matches of the two-legged tie, 4–0 and 2–1, to advance 6–1 on aggregate and set up a quarter final against Sparta Prague. In the spring, the first of the tie's two matches was played at Juliska, Dukla winning 2–1. However Dukla advanced no further in the competition, losing 2–0 in the return leg and 3–2 on aggregate.

20 August 2013 Second Round	FK TJ Štěchovice	1 – 4	Dukla Prague	Štěchovice
	Jelínek 19'	Report	7', 49' (pen.) Malý; 62' Štetina; 64' Pázler	Referee: Jech

25 September 2013 Third Round	FK Fotbal Třinec	1 – 1 (6–7 p)	Dukla Prague	Třinec
	Čtvrtníček 82'	Report	52' Hanousek	Stadium: Stadion Rudolfa Labaje; Attendance: 731; Referee: Adámková
	Penalties
	Malíř (penalty scored); Cigánek (penalty missed); Gavlák (penalty missed); Čtvrtníček (penalty scored); Čelůstka (penalty scored); Wojnar (penalty scored); Matoušek (penalty scored); Velner (penalty scored); Matoušek (penalty missed)		(penalty scored) Malý; (penalty scored) Marek; (penalty missed) Mareš; (penalty missed) Štetina; (penalty scored) Kalouda; (penalty scored) Marek Hanousek; (penalty scored) Vorel; (penalty scored) Božić; (penalty scored) Matěj Hanousek

5 October 2013 Fourth Round, 1st Leg	Dukla Prague	4 – 0	1. FK Příbram	Prague
	Pospěch 37'; Marek Hanousek 42'; Vorel 58'; Pázler 77'	Report		Stadium: Stadion Juliska; Attendance: 425; Referee: Marek

29 October 2013 Fourth Round, 2nd Leg	1. FK Příbram	1 – 2 (1 – 6 agg.)	Dukla Prague	Příbram
	Mišůn 54'	Report	10' Ouedraogo; 66' Néstor	Stadium: Na Litavce; Attendance: 520; Referee: Lerch

26 March 2014 Quarter final, 1st Leg	Dukla Prague	2 – 1	AC Sparta Prague	Prague
	Mareš 37'; Pospěch 65' (pen.)	Report	80' Krejčí	Stadium: Stadion Juliska; Attendance: 2,943; Referee: Kocourek

2 April 2014 Quarter final, 2nd Leg	AC Sparta Prague	2 – 0 (3 – 2 agg.)	Dukla Prague	Prague
	Lafata 34', 41'	Report		Stadium: Generali Arena; Attendance: 2,797; Referee: Jílek
