= 2012–13 FK Dukla Prague season =

Dukla Prague
2012–13 season
- Chairman: Michal Prokeš
- Manager: Luboš Kozel
- Stadium: Stadion Juliska
- Czech First League: 6th
- CMFS Cup: Fourth Round
- Top goalscorer: League: Zbyněk Pospěch (9); All: Zbyněk Pospěch (9)
- Highest home attendance: 4,257 v Sparta Prague (28 July 2012)
- Lowest home attendance: League: 1,120 v Mladá Boleslav (26 May 2013); Cup: 266 v Olomouc (31 October 2012)
Home colours	Away colours

The 2012–13 season was Dukla Prague's second consecutive season in the Czech First League.

== Players ==
=== Squad information ===
As of 5 August 2012.

Note: Flags indicate national team as defined under FIFA eligibility rules; some limited exceptions apply. Players may hold more than one non-FIFA nationality.

No.	Pos.	Nation	Player
1	GK	(Czech Republic) CZE	Filip Rada
3	MF	(Burkina Faso) BFA	Ismaël Ouedraogo
6	DF	(Czech Republic) CZE	Pavel Hašek
7	FW	(Czech Republic) CZE	Vojtěch Přeučil
8	FW	(Czech Republic) CZE	Jan Pázler
9	DF	(Czech Republic) CZE	Jan Vorel (captain)
10	MF	(Czech Republic) CZE	Miroslav Podrazký
11	FW	(Czech Republic) CZE	Zbyněk Pospěch
13	MF	(Czech Republic) CZE	Tomáš Berger
14	MF	(Czech Republic) CZE	Patrik Gedeon
15	DF	(Spain) ESP	José Romera

No.	Pos.	Nation	Player
16	MF	(Czech Republic) CZE	Vojtěch Engelmann
19	DF	(Slovakia) SVK	Lukáš Štetina (on loan from Metalist Kharkiv)
20	FW	(Czech Republic) CZE	Josef Marek
21	FW	(Czech Republic) CZE	Jan Svatonský
22	DF	(Croatia) CRO	Tomislav Božić
23	DF	(Czech Republic) CZE	Ondřej Vrzal
24	MF	(Czech Republic) CZE	Petr Malý
27	MF	(Czech Republic) CZE	Lubos Kalouda
29	GK	(Czech Republic) CZE	Jan Šebek (on loan from Jablonec)
30	GK	(Slovakia) SVK	Tomáš Kučera
32	MF	(Czech Republic) CZE	Tomáš Borek

=== Transfers ===
Dukla lost the services of loan players Ivan Lietava and Ondřej Švejdík, who did not stay on at the club following the end of the previous season. Midfielder Marek Hanousek, who stayed at Dukla on loan after signing for Plzeň the previous winter, concluded his loan and joined up with his new teammates. Defender David Mikula, who had spent the second half of the season away on loan, left the club. Forward Jan Pázler signed for Jablonec in the summer of 2012 but remained at Dukla on a season-long loan.

Six players went out on loan, these were: Michal Šmíd and Ondřej Šiml, both to Bohemians 1905, Miroslav Marković (to České Budějovice), Tomáš Pospíšil (to Baník Most), Matěj Marič (to TJ Kunice) and Jakub Sklenář (to Pardubice).

Defender Ondřej Vrzal finally became a Dukla player after more than two years at the club on loan from Plzeň. Forward Zbyněk Pospěch joined from local rivals Slavia Prague, and the club's defence was boosted by the loan signing of Lukáš Štetina as well as the permanent signing of Spaniard José Romera. Midfielders Luboš Kalouda and Tomáš Borek joined the club. Midfielder Tomáš Berger returned to Juliska after an unsuccessful loan period in Plzeň.

In the winter transfer window, Jan Pázler cut his loan at Dukla short and headed to Jablonec ahead of schedule. Another striker left; Miroslav Marković, who had been out on loan, signed a deal with fellow First League side Brno. The club brought in a second Spaniard, Néstor Albiach as an additional striker.

== Management and coaching staff ==
Position	Name
Manager	Luboš Kozel
Coach	Jan Suchopárek
Goalkeeping Coach	Tomáš Obermajer
Fitness Coach	Antonín Čepek
Team Leader	Jiří Blažek
Club Physio	Pavel Hrásky, Petr Král
Masseur	Radek Havala
Doctor	Ladislav Šindelář
Custodian	Jan Švestka

Source: fkdukla.cz

== Statistics ==
=== Appearances and goals ===
- Starts + Substitute appearances.

No.	Pos	Nat	Player	Total		League		Cup	
No.	Pos	Nat	Player	Apps	Goals	Apps	Goals	Apps	Goals
1	GK	(Czech Republic) CZE	Filip Rada	31	0	30+0	0	1+0	0
3	MF	(Burkina Faso) BFA	Ismaël Ouedraogo	6	1	1+2	1	3+0	0
4	DF	(Czech Republic) CZE	Matěj Hanousek	1	0	1+0	0	0+0	0
6	MF	(Czech Republic) CZE	Pavel Hašek	20	3	16+2	3	2+0	0
7	FW	(Czech Republic) CZE	Vojtěch Přeučil	28	4	11+14	3	0+3	1
8	FW	(Czech Republic) CZE	Jan Pázler	15	4	7+5	2	3+0	2
8	FW	(Spain) ESP	Néstor Albiach	13	4	10+3	4	0+0	0
9	DF	(Czech Republic) CZE	Jan Vorel	32	2	29+0	2	3+0	0
10	MF	(Czech Republic) CZE	Miroslav Podrazký	15	0	6+6	0	3+0	0
11	FW	(Czech Republic) CZE	Zbyněk Pospěch	29	9	22+6	9	1+0	0
13	MF	(Czech Republic) CZE	Tomáš Berger	27	4	23+2	4	1+1	0
14	MF	(Czech Republic) CZE	Patrik Gedeon	27	0	27+0	0	0+0	0
15	DF	(Spain) ESP	José Romera	24	0	21+1	0	2+0	0
16	FW	(Czech Republic) CZE	Vojtěch Engelmann	11	0	0+7	0	2+2	0
19	MF	(Slovakia) SVK	Lukáš Štetina	25	0	16+5	0	4+0	0
20	FW	(Czech Republic) CZE	Josef Marek	18	2	2+12	1	3+1	1
21	FW	(Czech Republic) CZE	Jan Svatonský	15	2	7+5	1	2+1	1
22	DF	(Croatia) CRO	Tomislav Božić	25	1	18+5	1	2+0	0
23	MF	(Czech Republic) CZE	Ondřej Vrzal	30	2	28+0	2	2+0	0
24	MF	(Czech Republic) CZE	Petr Malý	27	3	19+5	3	0+3	0
27	DF	(Czech Republic) CZE	Luboš Kalouda	20	3	8+8	3	4+0	0
30	GK	(Slovakia) SVK	Tomáš Kučera	3	0	0+0	0	3+0	0
32	FW	(Czech Republic) CZE	Tomáš Borek	32	7	28+1	7	2+1	0
	DF	(Czech Republic) CZE	Pavel Radoš	1	0	0+0	0	1+0	0

=== Goalscorers ===
Pos	Nat	Player	LIG	CUP	Total
1	(Czech Republic)	Zbyněk Pospěch	9	0	9
2	(Czech Republic)	Tomáš Borek	7	0	7
3	(Spain)	Néstor Albiach	4	0	4
3	(Czech Republic)	Tomáš Berger	4	0	4
3	(Czech Republic)	Vojtěch Přeučil	3	1	4
3	(Czech Republic)	Jan Pázler	2	2	4
7	(Czech Republic)	Pavel Hašek	3	0	3
7	(Czech Republic)	Luboš Kalouda	3	0	3
7	(Czech Republic)	Petr Malý	3	0	3
10	(Czech Republic)	Jan Vorel	2	0	2
10	(Czech Republic)	Ondřej Vrzal	2	0	2
10	(Czech Republic)	Josef Marek	1	1	2
10	(Czech Republic)	Jan Svatonský	1	1	2
14	(Croatia)	Tomislav Božić	1	0	1
14	(Burkina Faso)	Ismaël Ouedraogo	1	0	1
Own goals			2	0	2
		Totals	48	5	53

=== Home attendance ===
Competition	Average Attendance	Games
Czech First League	2,191	15
Cup	266	1
Average	2,071	16

== Czech First League ==
=== Results by round ===
Round	1	2	3	4	5	6	7	8	9	10	11	12	13	14	15	16	17	18	19	20	21	22	23	24	25	26	27	28	29	30
Ground	H	A	H	H	A	H	A	H	A	H	A	H	A	H	A	H	A	A	H	A	H	A	H	A	H	A	H	A	H	A
Result	D	L	W	D	D	L	D	D	D	W	L	D	W	W	L	W	D	D	W	L	W	D	W	W	D	D	W	D	W	L
Position	10	12	5	7	8	11	10	11	11	10	10	11	8	5	7	6	6	6	6	6	6	7	7	6	6	6	5	5	4	6

Source: FKDukla.cz
A = Away; H = Home; W = Win; D = Draw; L = Loss

=== Results summary ===
Overall								Home						Away					
Pld	W	D	L	GF	GA	GD	Pts	W	D	L	GF	GA	GD	W	D	L	GF	GA	GD
30	11	13	6	48	37	+11	46	9	5	1	31	13	+18	2	8	5	17	24	−7

Source: Gambrinus liga

=== League table ===
Pos	Team	Pld	W	D	L	GF	GA	GD	Pts	Qualification or relegation
4	Jablonec	30	13	10	7	49	41	+8	49	Qualification for Europa League third qualifying round (Note: Jablonec won the 2012–13 Czech Cup and qualified for the third qualifying round of the UEFA Europa League.)
5	Sigma Olomouc	30	13	8	9	38	29	+9	47	
6	Dukla Prague	30	11	13	6	48	37	+11	46	
7	Slavia Prague	30	11	9	10	41	33	+8	42	
8	Mladá Boleslav	30	10	8	12	34	43	−9	38	

Source: Fortuna liga
Rules for classification: 1) points; 2) head-to-head points; 3) head-to-head goal difference; 4) head-to-head goals scored; 5) goal difference; 6) number of goals scored.

=== Matches ===
==== July ====
28 July 2012 Round 1	Dukla Prague	1–1	Sparta Prague	Prague
	Hašek 30' (pen.)	Report	90' Kweuke	Stadium: Stadion Juliska; Attendance: 4,257; Referee: Hrubeš

==== August ====
4 August 2012 Round 2	Liberec	3–2	Dukla Prague	Liberec
	Šural 47', 60', 80'	Report	37' Hašek; 51' Malý	Stadium: Stadion u Nisy; Attendance: 4,232; Referee: Matějek

10 August 2012 Round 3	Dukla Prague	4–0	Teplice	Prague
	Pázler 28'; Přeučil 40'; Berger 48'; Kalouda 79'	Report		Stadium: Stadion Juliska; Referee: Paták

17 August 2012 Round 4	Dukla Prague	2–2	Slovácko	Prague
	Hašek 23'; Pázler 32'	Report	47' Kovář; 58' Volešák	Stadium: Stadion Juliska; Attendance: 1,928; Referee: Jílek

25 August 2012 Round 5	Příbram	1–1	Dukla Prague	Příbram
	Dejmek 57'	Report	40' Borek	Stadium: Na Litavce; Attendance: 1,875; Referee: Kocourek

==== September ====
2 September 2012 Round 6	Dukla Prague	1–4	Viktoria Plzeň	Prague
	Fillo 86' (o.g.)	Report	31', 66' Bakoš; 58' Darida; 77' Hanousek	Stadium: Stadion Juliska; Attendance: 3,258; Referee: Adámek

15 September 2012 Round 7	České Budějovice	1–1	Dukla Prague	České Budějovice
	Řezníček 16'	Report	62' Vorel	Stadium: Stadion Střelecký ostrov Attendance: 2,445; Referee: Bílek

23 September 2012 Round 8	Dukla Prague	0–0	Slavia Prague	Prague
		Report		Stadium: Stadion Juliska; Attendance: 4,122; Referee: Drábek

==== October ====
1 October 2012 Round 9	Jablonec	2–2	Dukla Prague	Jablonec nad Nisou
	Novák 35'; Lafata 90'	Report	16' Berger; 57' Vrzal	Stadium: Chance Arena; Attendance: 2,045; Referee: Jech

5 October 2012 Round 10	Dukla Prague	1–0	Hradec Králové	Prague
	Pospěch 22'	Report		Stadium: Stadion Juliska; Attendance: 1,293; Referee: Ardeleánu

21 October 2012 Round 11	Olomouc	2–1	Dukla Prague	Olomouc
	Ordoš 23'; Navrátil 55'	Report	84' Malý	Stadium: Andrův stadion Attendance: 5,413; Referee: Nenadál

26 October 2012 Round 12	Dukla Prague	2–2	Vysočina Jihlava	Prague
	Berger 16'; Pospěch 67'	Report	26' Karlík; 47' Obert	Stadium: Stadion Juliska; Attendance: 1,135; Referee: Proske

==== November ====
4 November 2012 Round 13	Zbrojovka Brno	1–3	Dukla Prague	Brno
	Berger 54' (o.g.)	Report	9', 36' Borek; 88' Marek	Stadium: Městský fotbalový stadion Srbská; Attendance: 3,262; Referee: Královec

9 November 2012 Round 14	Dukla Prague	2–0	Baník Ostrava	Prague
	Pospěch 1'; Svatonský 25'	Report		Stadium: Stadion Juliska; Attendance: 1,521; Referee: Adam

18 November 2012 Round 15	Mladá Boleslav	3–0	Dukla Prague	Mladá Boleslav
	Magera 50'; Johana 64', 69'	Report		Stadium: Městský stadion Attendance: 1,973; Referee: Zelinka

23 November 2012 Round 16	Dukla Prague	3–0	Liberec	Prague
	Pospěch 34', 87'; Vorel 75'	Report		Stadium: Stadion Juliska; Attendance: 1,641; Referee: Franěk

==== February ====
23 February 2013 Round 17	Teplice	1–1	Dukla Prague	Teplice
	Jarolím 47'	Report	36' Kalouda	Stadium: Na Stínadlech; Attendance: 1,542; Referee: Zelinka

==== March ====
4 March 2013 Round 18	Slovácko	0–0	Dukla Prague	Uherské Hradiště
		Report		Stadium: Městský stadion Attendance: 3,906; Referee: Paták

8 March 2013 Round 19	Dukla Prague	1–0	Příbram	Prague
	Přeučil 69'	Report		Stadium: Stadion Juliska; Attendance: 1,724; Referee: Matějek

17 March 2013 Round 20	Viktoria Plzeň	4–0	Dukla Prague	Plzeň
	Bakoš 15'; Čišovský 62'; Kovařík 86'; Adamov 88'	Report		Stadium: Stadion města Plzně; Attendance: 8,754; Referee: Drábek

29 March 2013 Round 21	Dukla Prague	4–0	České Budějovice	Prague
	Borek 13', 74'; Pospěch 43'; Božić 72'	Report		Stadium: Stadion Juliska; Attendance: 1,920; Referee: Franěk

==== April ====
5 April 2013 Round 22	Slavia Prague	0–0	Dukla Prague	Prague
		Report		Stadium: Eden Arena; Attendance: 5,510; Referee: Ardeleánu

13 April 2013 Round 23	Dukla Prague	5–1	Jablonec	Prague
	Néstor 37', 78'; Malý 54' (pen.); Beneš 85' (o.g.); Pospěch 86'	Report	24' Loučka	Stadium: Stadion Juliska; Attendance: 2,193; Referee: Nenadál

21 April 2013 Round 24	Hradec Králové	0–3	Dukla Prague	Hradec Králové
		Report	65' Borek; 74' Přeučil; 82' Pospěch	Stadium: Všesportovní stadion Attendance: 3,490; Referee: Jech

26 April 2013 Round 25	Dukla Prague	0–0	Olomouc	Prague
		Report		Stadium: Stadion Juliska; Attendance: 3,580; Referee: Zelinka

==== May ====
3 May 2013 Round 26	Vysočina Jihlava	1–1	Dukla Prague	Jihlava
	Karlík 31'	Report	87' Borek	Stadium: Stadion v Jiráskově ulici Attendance: 2,689; Referee: Bílek

14 May 2013 Round 27	Dukla Prague	3–2	Zbrojovka Brno	Prague
	Pospěch 11'; Berger 43'; Néstor 62'	Report	54' Kroupa; 64' Frejlach	Stadium: Stadion Juliska; Attendance: 1,293; Referee: Kovařík

22 May 2013 Round 28	Baník Ostrava	2–2	Dukla Prague	Ostrava
	Vorel 10' (o.g.); Fantiš 36'	Report	3' Ouedraogo; 49' Vrzal	Stadium: Bazaly; Attendance: 6,048; Referee: Jílek

26 May 2013 Round 29	Dukla Prague	2–1	Mladá Boleslav	Prague
	Néstor 29'; Kalouda 44'	Report	56' Johana	Stadium: Stadion Juliska; Attendance: 1,120; Referee: Proske

==== June ====
1 June 2013 Round 30	Sparta Prague	3–0	Dukla Prague	Prague
	Vácha 15'; Kadlec 69', 87'	Report		Stadium: Generali Arena; Attendance: 12,355; Referee: Kovařík

== Cup ==
As a First League team, Dukla entered the Cup at the second round stage. In the second round, Dukla faced third league side FK Kolín, who they defeated 1–0 by way of a first-half goal from Jan Svatonský. The third round match at second league side 1. HFK Olomouc was a closer affair; with Olomouc leading 2–0 with just eight minutes remaining, goals from Přeučil and Marek pushed the game to a penalty shootout, in which Dukla were victorious.

In the fourth round, Dukla lost in the first leg of their 31 October tie against fellow First League side Sigma Olomouc by a single goal in front of just 266 spectators. In the return leg, four weeks later, the game had an extraordinary amount of injury time after the referee had to be replaced during the match. Ten minutes into first-half injury time, leading thanks to two Jan Pázler goals, Dukla were in a good position, but Olomouc scored twelve minutes into stoppage time and went on to score their second goal of the game and third of the tie in the second half, to which Dukla had no answer. Dukla were therefore eliminated from the competition in the fourth round for the second successive season.

29 August 2012 Second Round	FK Kolín	0–1	Dukla Prague	Kolín
		Report	43' Svatonský	Attendance: 860; Referee: Kalenda

26 September 2012 Third Round	1. HFK Olomouc	2–2 (3–4 p)	Dukla Prague	Olomouc
	Žondra 29'; Hromek 80'	Report	82' Přeučil; 86' Marek	Stadium: Stadion FK Holice; Attendance: 635; Referee: Trávníček
	Penalties
	Kobylík (penalty scored); Lukášek (penalty scored); Onofrej (penalty missed); Čtvrtníček (penalty scored); Žondra (penalty missed)		(penalty scored) Podrazký; (penalty scored) Pospěch; (penalty scored) Marek; (penalty scored) Vorel; (penalty missed) Přeučil

31 October 2012 Fourth Round, 1st Leg	Dukla Prague	0–1	SK Sigma Olomouc	Prague
		Report	37' Pospíšil	Stadium: Stadion Juliska; Attendance: 266; Referee: Jílek

28 November 2012 Fourth Round, 2nd Leg	SK Sigma Olomouc	2–2 (3–2 agg.)	Dukla Prague	Olomouc
	Doležal 45+12'; Pospíšil 50'	Report	29', 45+10' Pázler	Stadium: Andrův stadion Attendance: 2,643; Referee: Nenadál (after 26 minutes Hájek)
