= Tomáš Kučera (footballer, born 1984) =

Slovak footballer

Personal information
- Date of birth: 19 June 1984 (age 42)
- Place of birth: Czechoslovakia
- Height: 1.88 m (6 ft 2 in)
- Position: Goalkeeper

Senior career*
Years	Team	Apps	(Gls)
2008–2010	Karviná	27	(0)
2010	→ Liptovský Mikuláš (loan)		
2011–2014	FK Dukla Prague	3	(0)
2014	Lokomotíva Zvolen	5	(0)
- * Club domestic league appearances and goals as of 31 December 2014

Tomáš Kučera (born 19 June 1984) is a Slovak football player, who played in Slovakia and the Czech Republic as a goalkeeper.

== Career statistics ==
As of 30 June 2014

Club	Season	League		Cup		Total	
Club	Season	Apps	Goals	Apps	Goals	Apps	Goals
Karviná	2008–09	18	0	0	0	18	0
Karviná	2009–10	9	0	0	0	9	0
Total		27	0	0	0	27	0
Dukla Prague	2010–11	2	0	0	0	2	0
Dukla Prague	2011–12	1	0	4	0	5	0
Dukla Prague	2012–13	0	0	3	0	3	0
Dukla Prague	2013–14	0	0	4	0	4	0
Total		3	0	11	0	14	0
Career total		30	0	11	0	41	0
