= Pospěch =

Pospěch is a Czech surname. Notable people with the surname include:

- Zbyněk Pospěch (born 1982), Czech footballer
- Zdeněk Pospěch (born 1978), Czech footballer
