= Jan Vorel =

Czech retired football defender (born 1978)

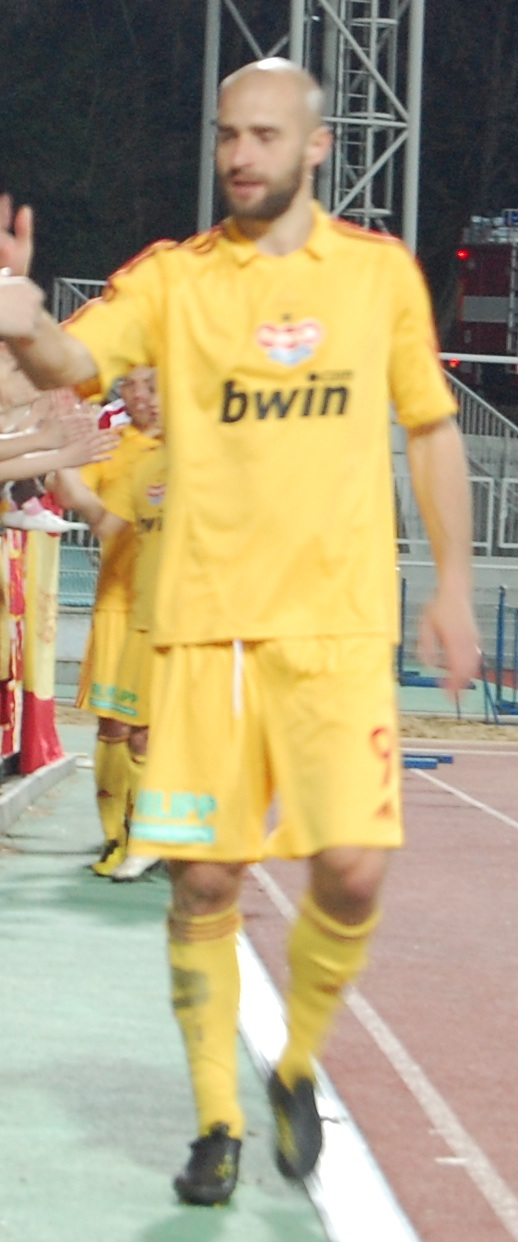

Personal information
- Date of birth: 1 September 1978 (age 48)
- Place of birth: Prague, Czechoslovakia
- Height: 1.80 m (5 ft 11 in)
- Position: Defender

Youth career
- 1985–1989: FK Viktoria Žižkov
- 1989–1991: FK Dukla Prague
- 1992–1995: FK Chmel Blšany

Senior career*
Years	Team	Apps	(Gls)
1996–1997	→ SC Xaverov (loan)	-	(–)
1997–2007	Blšany	218	(5)
2006–2007	→ Slavia Prague (loan)	11	(0)
2007–2008	Aris Limassol	27	(0)
2008–2015	Dukla Prague	163	(6)

International career
1997	Czech Republic U18	2	(0)
1997	Czech Republic U20	1	(0)
1998	Czech Republic U21	6	(0)
1998	Czech Republic B	3	(0)
- * Club domestic league appearances and goals

Jan Vorel (born 1 September 1978) is a Czech retired football defender who played in the Czech First League principally for Blšany and Dukla Prague. He represented his country at youth level between 1997 and 1998.

== Career ==
Born in Prague, he played for the youth teams of Prague clubs Viktoria Žižkov and FK Dukla Prague before joining the ranks of FK Chmel Blšany youth side aged 14. After a loan spell at FC Xaverov Horní Počernice he broke into the senior team at Blšany where he spent the majority of his career, making 197 appearances for the club, aiding their promotion to the 1st Division in 1998. He served as club captain during his time at Blšany.

Between 1997 and 1998, Vorel represented numerous national football teams of the Czech Republic including the Czech Republic U21 team, for whom he made six appearances.

After FK Chmel Blšany's relegation from top tier football in 2006, Vorel he was loaned out to Slavia Prague, with the option for a permanent transfer at the end of the 2006/07 season. He made 8 starts, 11 appearances overall, during his stay at Slavia, helping the team to second place in the league. The club however decided against signing the player.

In 2007, he left the Czech League, completing a move to Aris Limassol in Cyprus. Limassol were relegated from the Cypriot First Division at the end of the 2007/08 season after finishing 12th.

In 2008, Vorel returned to the Czech Republic, signing for FK Dukla Prague, the club he played for as a youngster. Following Dukla's promotion in 2011, Vorel played in the Czech First League for the first time in more than four years on 29 July 2011. He functioned as captain during his time at Dukla. In November 2012, Vorel extended his contract with Dukla until the summer of 2014. In March 2013, Vorel played the shortest match of his life, being sent off after just 20 seconds in a league match for Dukla against Plzeň, which Dukla went on to lose 4–0. Vorel was again sent off in the fourth match of the 2013–14 season, receiving a four-game suspension following a two-footed challenge on Slavia striker Dávid Škutka. In October 2013, he scored Dukla's third goal in a 4–0 Czech Cup victory against Pribram. He left Dukla and ended his professional career, joining amateur side Všenorský SK in the summer of 2015.

== Career statistics ==
Club	Season	League		Cup		Other		Total	
Club	Season	Apps	Goals	Apps	Goals	Apps	Goals	Apps	Goals
Blšany	1997–98	21	2	0	0	0	0	21	2
Blšany	1998–99	20	1	0	0	0	0	20	1
Blšany	1999–2000	11	0	0	0	0	0	11	0
Blšany	2000–01	27	0	0	0	0	0	27	0
Blšany	2001–02	26	0	0	0	0	0	26	0
Blšany	2002–03	28	0	0	0	0	0	28	0
Blšany	2003–04	29	0	0	0	0	0	29	0
Blšany	2004–05	27	1	0	0	0	0	27	1
Blšany	2005–06	29	1	0	0	0	0	29	1
Blšany	Total	218	5	0	0	0	0	218	5
Slavia Prague	2006–07	11	0	0	0	0	0	11	0
Aris Limassol	2007–08	27	0	0	0	0	0	27	0
Dukla Prague	2008–09	27	0	0	0	0	0	27	0
Dukla Prague	2009–10	29	1	0	0	0	0	29	1
Dukla Prague	2010–11	27	1	2	0	0	0	29	1
Dukla Prague	2011–12	26	2	0	0	0	0	26	2
Dukla Prague	2012–13	29	2	3	0	0	0	32	2
Dukla Prague	2013–14	15	0	3	1	0	0	18	1
Dukla Prague	2014–15	10	0	0	0	0	0	10	0
Dukla Prague	Total	163	6	8	1	0	0	171	7
Career total		419	11	8	1	0	0	427	12
