= Vojtěch Přeučil =

Czech footballer

Personal information
- Date of birth: 19 September 1990 (age 36)
- Place of birth: Czechoslovakia
- Height: 1.85 m (6 ft 1 in)
- Position: Striker

Team information
- Current team: ATSV Brand
- Number: 23

Senior career*
Years	Team	Apps	(Gls)
2010–2013	Dukla Prague	47	(3)
2012	→ Sezimovo Ústí (loan)	13	(4)
2013–2015	Vysočina Jihlava	21	(0)
2014	→ Táborsko (loan)	9	(1)
2015	→ Baník Sokolov (loan)	13	(8)
2016–2018	Baník Sokolov	49	(9)
2018–2019	Zbuzany 1953		
2020–2022	ASV Schrems	16	(7)
2022–2023	Bad Großpertholz	24	(30)
2023–	ATSV Brand	14	(13)
- * Club domestic league appearances and goals as of 16:37, 31 March 2024 (UTC)

Vojtěch Přeučil (born 19 September 1990) is a Czech football player who currently plays for Austrian 1. Klasse Waldviertel side ATSV Brand.

== Career ==
=== Club career ===
In January 2020, Přeučil moved to Austrian club, ASV Schrems.

== Career statistics ==
As of 1 June 2014

Club	Season	League		Cup		Total	
Club	Season	Apps	Goals	Apps	Goals	Apps	Goals
Dukla Prague	2010–11	17	0	3	1	20	1
Dukla Prague	2011–12	5	0	4	0	9	0
Total		22	0	7	1	29	1
Sezimovo Ústí	2011–12	13	4	0	0	13	4
Dukla Prague	2012–13	25	3	3	1	28	4
Jihlava	2013–14	17	0	0	0	17	0
Career total		77	7	10	2	87	9
