= Ondřej Vrzal =

Czech footballer

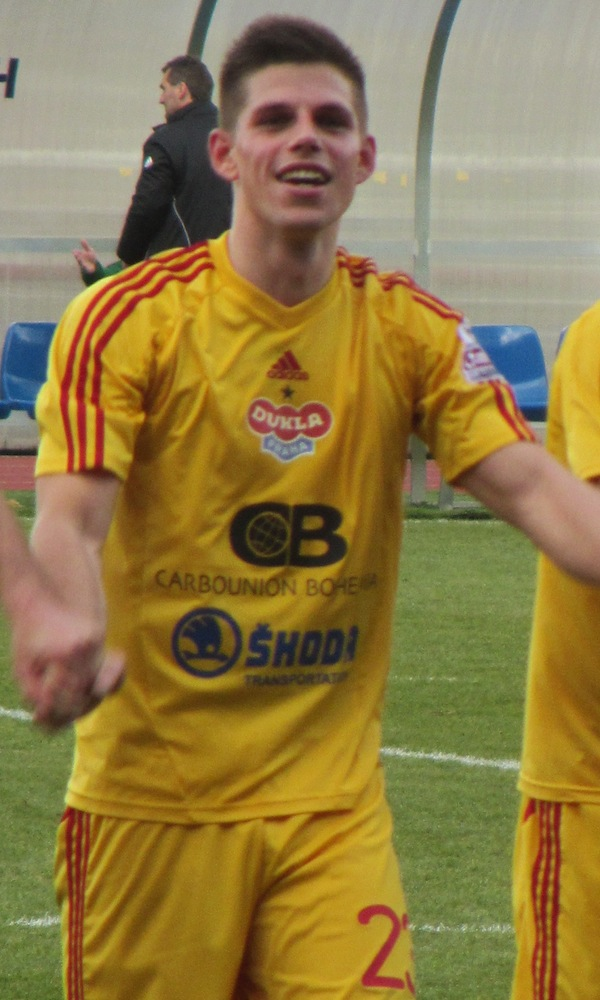

Personal information
- Date of birth: 1 March 1987 (age 39)
- Place of birth: Czechoslovakia
- Height: 1.78 m (5 ft 10 in)
- Position: Defender

Youth career
- 1992–1997: FSC Libuš
- 1997–2007: Slavia Prague

Senior career*
Years	Team	Apps	(Gls)
2007	Slavia Prague	0	(0)
2007–2012	Viktoria Plzeň	10	(0)
2010–2012	→ Dukla Prague (loan)	46	(1)
2012–2017	Dukla Prague	68	(7)
2014	→ Jablonec (loan)	3	(0)
2017	→ Bohemians 1905 (loan)	0	(0)
- * Club domestic league appearances and goals as of 30 June 2017

Ondřej Vrzal (born 1 March 1987) is a Czech former football player who played in the Czech First League for clubs including Dukla Prague, Viktoria Plzeň and Jablonec.

== Career ==
Vrzal started playing football with FSC Libuš as a boy, later moving to the youth team of Slavia Prague. He joined FC Viktoria Plzeň in 2007, taking part in 10 league games during his time with the club. While at Plzeň Vrzal suffered a cruciate ligament injury. He joined Dukla Prague, then of the second league, on loan in February 2010. After the club finished the 2009–10 season in sixth position, Vrzal was re-signed to Dukla on a year-long loan. Vrzal finally made his move to Dukla permanent in June 2012, signing a two-year contract. During the winter break of the 2013–14 season, Vrzal joined FK Baumit Jablonec on loan. After making three league appearances for Jablonec, Vrzal was one of a number of players released by the club at the end of the season. Vrzal joined Bohemians 1905 on loan in the winter break of the 2016–17 season.

== Career statistics ==
As of 30 June 2017

Club	Season	League		Cup		Total	
Club	Season	Apps	Goals	Apps	Goals	Apps	Goals
Slavia Prague	2006–07	0	0	0	0	0	0
Viktoria Plzeň	2007–08	10	0	0	0	10	0
Viktoria Plzeň	2008–09	0	0	0	0	0	0
Viktoria Plzeň	2009–10	0	0	0	0	0	0
Viktoria Plzeň	Total	10	0	0	0	10	0
Dukla Prague	2009–10	0	0	0	0	0	0
Dukla Prague	2010–11	18	1	0	0	18	1
Dukla Prague	2011–12	28	0	2	0	30	0
Dukla Prague	2012–13	28	2	2	0	30	2
Dukla Prague	2013–14	16	0	1	0	17	0
Dukla Prague	Total	90	3	5	0	95	3
Jablonec	2013–14	3	0	0	0	3	0
Dukla Prague	2015–16	23	5	2	0	25	5
Dukla Prague	2016–17	1	0	0	0	1	0
Bohemians 1905	2016–17	0	0	0	0	0	0
Career total		127	8	5	0	132	8
