= Jan Berger (footballer, born 1955) =

Czech footballer

Personal information
- Date of birth: 27 November 1955 (age 70)
- Place of birth: Prague, Czechoslovakia
- Height: 1.79 m (5 ft 10 in)
- Position: Midfielder

Youth career
- 1965–1972: TJ Břevnov

Senior career*
Years	Team	Apps	(Gls)
1972–1976	TJ Břevnov		
1976–1978	Viktoria Plzeň		
1978–1980	Dukla Prague		(6)
1980–1986	Sparta Prague	146	(34)
1986–1990	FC Zürich		
1990–1991	FC Zug		

International career
1980–1987	Czechoslovakia	30	(3)

Managerial career
- 2000–2003: Sparta Prague Reserves
- 2003–2005: FK Brandýs nad Labem
- 2005: FK Dukla Prague
- 2006–2008: SK Zeleneč
- 2009: Slavoj Vyšehrad
Medal record
Representing Czechoslovakia
Men's Football
Gold medal – first place	1980 Moscow	Team competition
- * Club domestic league appearances and goals

Jan Berger (born 27 November 1955) is a Czech football manager and former player who most recently managed Slavoj Vyšehrad.

A midfielder, Berger played in Czechoslovakia for Dukla Prague and Sparta Prague, winning three league titles in total. He also played internationally, winning gold with Czechoslovakia in the 1980 Olympic football competition and bronze in the UEFA European Championship held in the same year.

== Club career ==
Berger was born in Prague. In Czechoslovakia, Berger played for Dukla Prague, winning the league title in 1979 and scoring a total of six goals between 1978 and 1980. He transferred to Sparta Prague in 1980 after the 1980 Olympic football tournament. He was named Czechoslovak Footballer of the Year in 1984. While a Sparta player, Berger won two more league titles, before leaving in 1986 to continue his career in Switzerland.

== International career ==
Berger played 30 matches for the Czechoslovakia national team, scoring 3 goals. He won a bronze medal in the 1980 UEFA European Football Championship and was a participant in the 1982 FIFA World Cup.

== Management career ==
Berger returned to Dukla Prague in 2005, overseeing the second half of the 2004–05 league campaign for the club in the Prague Championship. The club finished the season second. He remained at the club, but left mid-way through the 2005–06 season with the club eventually finishing in 13th position.

== Personal life ==
Berger is the uncle of Patrik Berger who represented the Czech Republic. He is the father of footballer Tomáš Berger.
