= 2015–16 Czech National Football League =

Czech National Football League
- Season: 2015–16
- Champions: Karviná
- Promoted: Karviná, Hradec Králové
- Relegated: Olomouc B, Vyšehrad
- Matches: 210
- Goals: 543 (2.59 per match)
- Top goalscorer: Jan Pázler (17 goals)

The 2015–16 Czech National Football League is the 23rd season of the Czech Republic's second tier football league. The season starts on 1 August 2015.

== Team changes ==
The number of teams in the Czech National Football League decreased from 16 to 15 for the 2015–16 season.

=== From FNL ===
- SK Sigma Olomouc (promoted to 2015–16 Czech First League)
- FC Fastav Zlín (promoted to 2015–16 Czech First League)
- FK Baník Most (relegated to 2015–16 Bohemian Football League)
- FK Kolín (relegated to 2015–16 Bohemian Football League)
- FK Viktoria Žižkov (relegated to 2015–16 Bohemian Football League) after being denied FNL licence for the 2015–16 season.

=== To FNL ===
- FC Hradec Králové (relegated from 2014–15 Czech First League)
- SK Dynamo České Budějovice (relegated from 2014–15 Czech First League)
- SK Sigma Olomouc B (promoted from 2014–15 Moravian–Silesian Football League)
- FK Slavoj Vyšehrad (promoted from 2014–15 Bohemian Football League)

== Team overview ==
Location of clubs in the 2015–16 2. Liga

== League table ==
| Pos | Team | Pld | W | D | L | GF | GA | GD | Pts | Promotion or relegation |
|---|---|---|---|---|---|---|---|---|---|---|
| 1 | Karviná (P) | 28 | 17 | 8 | 3 | 50 | 17 | +33 | 59 | Promotion to 2016–17 1. Liga |
| 2 | Hradec Králové (P) | 28 | 17 | 8 | 3 | 45 | 16 | +29 | 59 | Promotion to 2016–17 1. Liga |
| 3 | Znojmo | 28 | 17 | 5 | 6 | 62 | 33 | +29 | 56 | |
| 4 | Sokolov | 28 | 10 | 11 | 7 | 32 | 26 | +6 | 41 | |
| 5 | Táborsko | 28 | 9 | 12 | 7 | 39 | 34 | +5 | 39 | |
| 6 | Pardubice | 28 | 10 | 8 | 10 | 29 | 29 | 0 | 38 | |
| 7 | Ústí nad Labem | 28 | 8 | 11 | 9 | 39 | 38 | +1 | 35 | |
| 8 | Vlašim | 28 | 9 | 8 | 11 | 35 | 33 | +2 | 35 | |
| 9 | Varnsdorf | 28 | 8 | 10 | 10 | 35 | 44 | −9 | 34 | |
| 10 | Frýdek-Místek | 28 | 8 | 9 | 11 | 30 | 37 | −7 | 33 | |
| 11 | Opava | 28 | 6 | 14 | 8 | 34 | 37 | −3 | 32 | |
| 12 | České Budějovice | 28 | 6 | 14 | 8 | 41 | 48 | −7 | 32 | |
| 13 | Třinec | 28 | 6 | 9 | 13 | 29 | 41 | −12 | 27 | |
| 14 | Sigma Olomouc B (R) | 28 | 5 | 6 | 17 | 23 | 49 | −26 | 21 | Relegation to 2016–17 MSFL |
| 15 | Slavoj Vyšehrad (R) | 28 | 5 | 5 | 18 | 20 | 61 | −41 | 20 | Relegation to 2016–17 ČFL |

Source: Fotbalová národní liga
Rules for classification: 1) points; 2) goal difference; 3) number of goals scored.
(P) Promoted; (R) Relegated

== See also ==
- 2015–16 Czech First League
- 2015–16 Czech Cup
