= Filip Rada =

Czech footballer

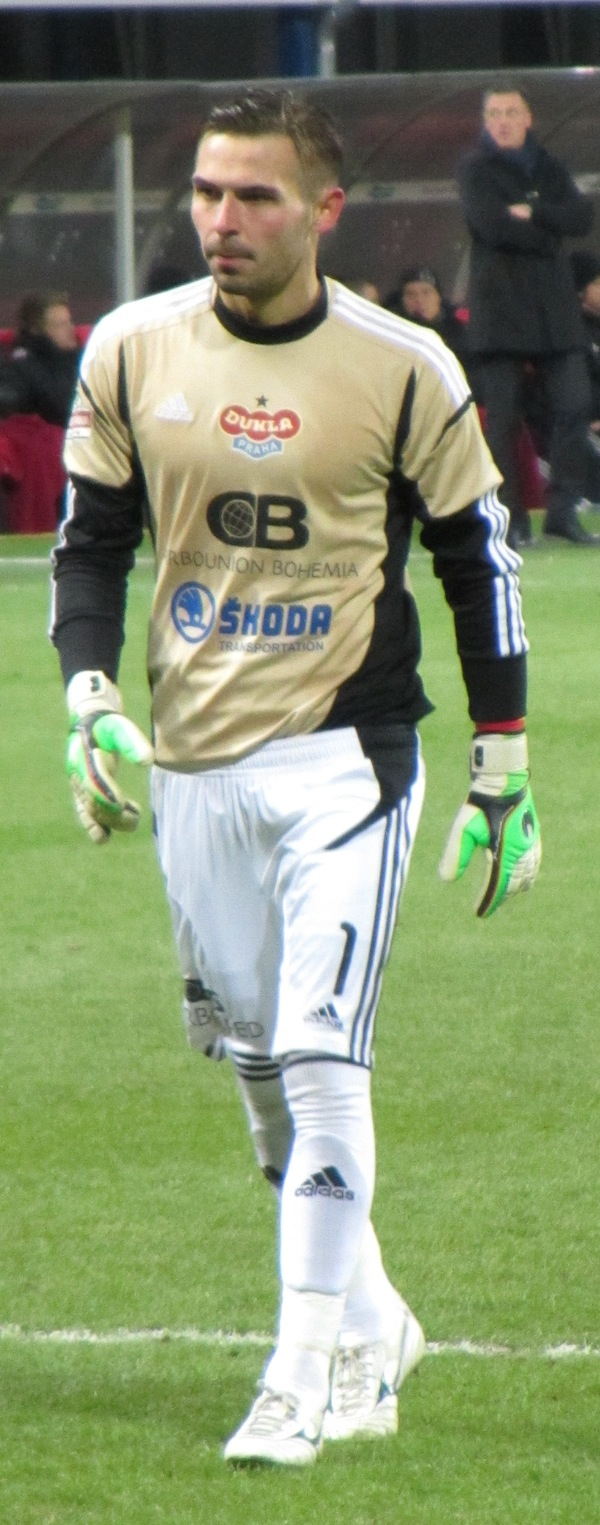

Personal information
- Date of birth: 5 September 1984 (age 42)
- Place of birth: Prague, Czechoslovakia
- Height: 1.86 m (6 ft 1 in)
- Position: Goalkeeper

Senior career*
Years	Team	Apps	(Gls)
2003–2007	Sparta Prague B		
2004–2005	→ Xaverov B (loan)		
2005	→ Bohemians 1905 (loan)	4	(0)
2005–2006	→ Břevnov (loan)	23	(0)
2006–2007	→ Blšany (loan)	14	(0)
2007–2025	Dukla Prague	332	(0)
- * Club domestic league appearances and goals as of 19 June 2024

Filip Rada (born 5 September 1984) is a Czech former football player who last played for Dukla Prague as a goalkeeper. He is the son of former national team coach Petr Rada.

== Career ==
=== Early career ===
Rada started his footballing career at Sparta Prague, going out on loan in his younger years. He joined Bohemians 1905 in the Bohemian Football League on a year-long loan in 2005, keeping a clean sheet in his first ever match in the Czech third tier. However Rada played just four league matches before moving on loan to Břevnov of the same league in October 2005, where he remained for the rest of the 2005–06 season. Rada spent the following season on loan at Blšany in the Czech 2. Liga.

=== Dukla Prague ===
Rada went on to Dukla Prague in 2007, keeping three clean sheets in the first part of the 2007–08 Czech 2. Liga. Rada played for Dukla in the second division for four years before the club celebrated promotion to the top-flight Czech First League in 2011. Rada was responsible for two of the visiting team's goals in August 2011 as league champions FC Viktoria Plzeň won 4–2 against Dukla in Prague, dropping the ball in the goal area immediately before one goal and kicking a goal kick along the ground directly to an opponent, allowing an easy goal on another occasion. In November 2012, Rada extended his contract with Dukla until the summer of 2015. He signed another extension to his contract, in the winter break of the 2018–2019 season, until 2022.

== Honours ==
=== Club ===
FK Dukla Prague

- Czech National Football League: 2010–11, 2023–24

== Career statistics ==
As of 18 July 2020

Club	Season	League		Cup		Total	
Club	Season	Apps	Goals	Apps	Goals	Apps	Goals
Bohemians 1905	2005–06	4	0	0	0	4	0
Břevnov	2005–06	23	0	0	0	23	0
Blšany	2006–07	14	0	0	0	14	0
Dukla Prague	2007–08	24	0	0	0	24	0
Dukla Prague	2008–09	2	0	0	0	2	0
Dukla Prague	2009–10	12	0	0	0	12	0
Dukla Prague	2010–11	28	0	2	0	30	0
Dukla Prague	2011–12	29	0	0	0	29	0
Dukla Prague	2012–13	30	0	1	0	31	0
Dukla Prague	2013–14	30	0	2	0	32	0
Dukla Prague	2014–15	20	0	1	0	21	0
Dukla Prague	2015–16	26	0	0	0	26	0
Dukla Prague	2016–17	23	0	1	0	24	0
Dukla Prague	2017–18	28	0	0	0	28	0
Dukla Prague	2018–19	30	0	0	0	30	0
Dukla Prague	2019–20	13	0	4	0	17	0
Total		295	0	11	0	306	0
Career total		336	0	11	0	347	0
