= Marek Hlinka =

Slovak footballer (born 1990)

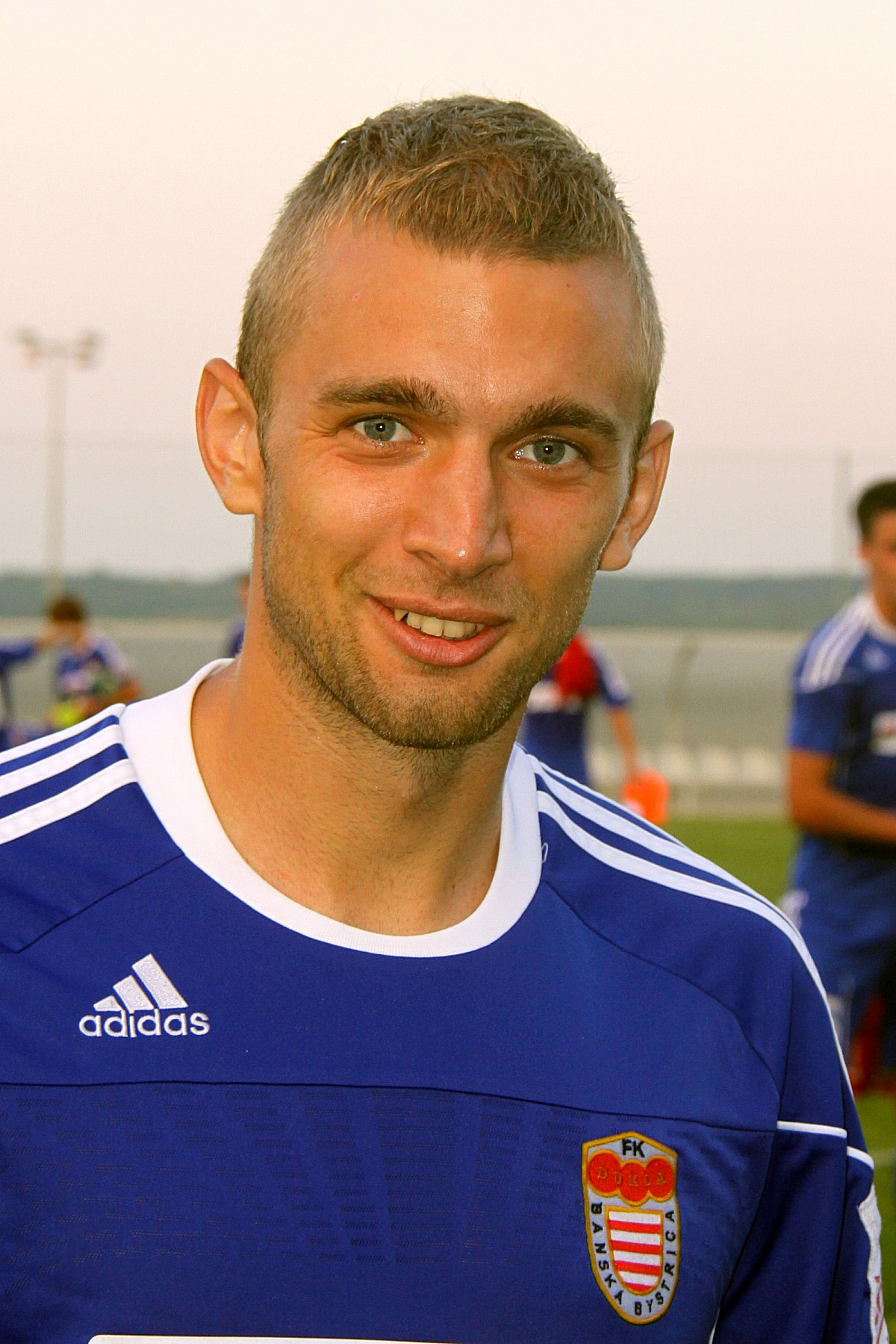

Personal information
- Date of birth: 4 October 1990 (age 36)
- Place of birth: Banská Bystrica, Czechoslovakia
- Height: 1.82 m (6 ft 0 in)
- Position: Midfielder

Team information
- Current team: Hanácká Slavia Kroměříž
- Number: 33

Youth career
- Dukla Banská Bystrica

Senior career*
Years	Team	Apps	(Gls)
2009–2013	Dukla Banská Bystrica	90	(6)
2009	→ ŽP Šport Podbrezová (loan)	1	(0)
2013–2016	Dukla Prague	35	(3)
2015	→ Spartak Trnava (loan)	12	(0)
2015–2016	→ Skalica (loan)	27	(1)
2016–2018	Baník Ostrava	56	(7)
2018	Torpedo Kutaisi	6	(1)
2019–2023	Trinity Zlín	102	(2)
2023–2025	Dukla Banská Bystrica	64	(5)
2025–	Hanácká Slavia Kroměříž	30	(2)

International career
2009	Slovakia U19	2	(0)
2010–2012	Slovakia U21	11	(0)
- * Club domestic league appearances and goals as of 28 May 2026

Marek Hlinka (born 4 October 1990) is a Slovak footballer who plays for Hanácká Slavia Kroměříž as a midfielder.

Hlinka started his club career at Banská Bystrica, where he made 90 league appearances. He joined Dukla Prague in July 2013.

On 1 July 2025, Hlinka signed a two-year contract with Hanácká Slavia Kroměříž.
