= José Romera =

Spanish footballer

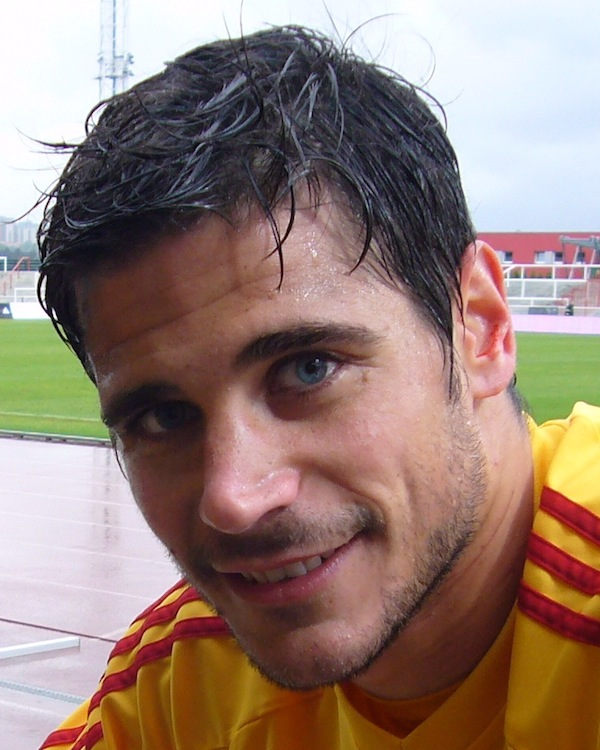

Personal information
- Full name: José Antonio Romera Navarro
- Date of birth: 8 September 1987 (age 39)
- Place of birth: Xirivella, Spain
- Height: 1.79 m (5 ft 10 in)
- Position: Right back

Team information
- Current team: Utiel

Youth career
- Torre Levante
- Levante

Senior career*
Years	Team	Apps	(Gls)
2006–2008	Levante B	26	(0)
2006–2007	→ Onda (loan)	37	(0)
2008–2012	Gandía	137	(3)
2012–2014	Dukla Prague	49	(2)
2014–2016	Jablonec	41	(1)
2016–2018	Dinamo București	57	(1)
2018–2020	Almería	58	(1)
2021	UCAM Murcia	10	(0)
2021–2023	La Nucía	67	(0)
2023–	Utiel	37	(2)
- * Club domestic league appearances and goals as of 12 October 2024

José Antonio Romera Navarro (born 8 September 1987) is a Spanish professional footballer who plays for Utiel as a right back.

== Football career ==
=== Early career ===
Born in Xirivella, Valencian Community, Romera was a Levante UD youth graduate. After making his senior debut while on loan at Tercera División side CD Onda in the 2006–07 season, he returned to Levante and was assigned to the reserve team in Segunda División B.

In 2008 Romera signed for CF Gandía in the fourth division. An immediate first-choice, he achieved promotion to the third division in 2010.

=== Czech Republic ===
In 2012, Romera signed for Czech team FK Dukla Prague after impressing on a trial. He made his professional debut on 10 August 2012, coming on as a late substitute for Jan Pázler in a 4–0 home routing of FK Teplice.

Romera signed a new two-year deal with the club on 5 July 2013. He scored his first professional goal on 23 August, netting the opener in a 1–1 home draw against FK Mladá Boleslav.

Romera signed a three-year contract with fellow league team FK Baumit Jablonec on 28 May 2014. A regular starter during his first season, he only featured sparingly in his second.

=== Dinamo București ===
On 14 July 2016, Romera signed a one-year contract with Romanian side FC Dinamo București. The following 30 May, he extended his contract for a further campaign.

=== Almería ===
On 12 July 2018 free agent Romera returned to his native country, after agreeing to a one-year deal with Segunda División side UD Almería. He made his debut for the club on 17 August, starting in a 0–1 away loss against Cádiz CF.

Romera became an undisputed starter for the Andalusians, and renewed his contract until 2021 on 29 May 2019. On 16 September of the following year, after losing his starting spot to Iván Balliu, he terminated his contract with the club.

=== Later career ===
In January 2021 he joined UCAM Murcia, playing half a season before joining CF La Nucía in July 2021.

== Honours ==
Dinamo București

- Cupa Ligii: 2016–17
