= Patrik Gedeon =

Czech football player

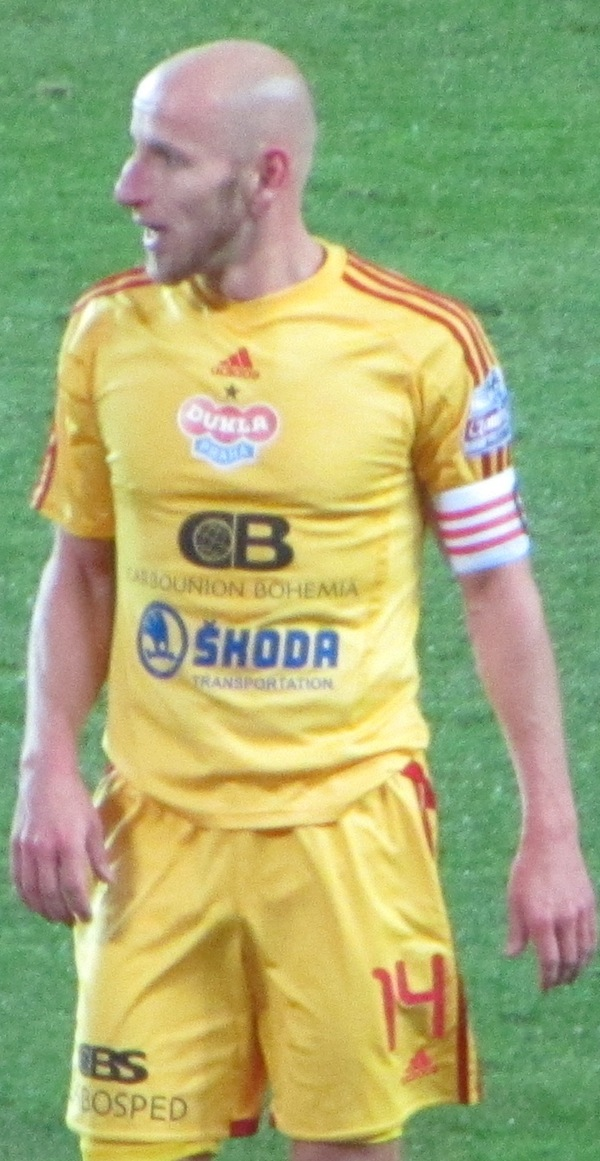

Personal information
- Date of birth: 19 July 1975 (age 51)
- Place of birth: Chomutov, Czechoslovakia
- Height: 1.75 m (5 ft 9 in)
- Position: Midfielder

Team information
- Current team: Chomutov
- Number: 14

Senior career*
Years	Team	Apps	(Gls)
1994–1995	Chomutov		
1995–2001	Chmel Blšany	158	(18)
2001–2005	Slavia Prague	92	(6)
2006	Vaduz	17	(2)
2006–2007	Wisła Płock	27	(0)
2007	Chmel Blšany	6	(0)
2008	SIAD Most	13	(0)
2008–2015	Dukla Prague	167	(4)
2015–2016	→ Baník Most (loan)		
2016	Chomutov		

International career
2002–2003	Czech Republic	3	(0)
- * Club domestic league appearances and goals as of 19 July 2024

Patrik Gedeon (born 19 July 1975) is a Czech footballer who plays as a midfielder for FC Chomutov. He has played international football for the Czech Republic.

== Club career ==
Gedeon played for six years at Chmel Blšany, where he was captain.

In 2001, Gedeon moved to Slavia Prague, signing a three-year contract for a transfer fee of 12 million Czech koruna. He served as Slavia's captain during his time at the club.

Gedeon sustained a knee injury after playing just five games in the 2003/04 season, and although he attempted to make a comeback in a game against Slovácko, he lasted just 17 minutes and did not feature for Slavia's first team for the rest of the season.

In September 2005, Gedeon suffered a knee injury in a game against Viktoria Plzeň. Gedeon missed two months of the season with the injury before returning to Slavia's first team in a match against Blšany in November, where he wore the captain's armband.

In January 2006, Gedeon headed to Liechtenstein to play for FC Vaduz in the Swiss Challenge League, signing a 2 1/2-year contract. However, in July of the same year Gedeon left Vaduz and joined Czech manager Josef Csaplár at Polish side Wisła Płock.

In the summer of 2007, Gedeon signed an amateur contract with Chmel Blšany, where he played the first half of the 2007/08 season. In January 2008 he began training with FK SIAD Most.

In July 2008 Gedeon signed for FK Dukla Prague in the Czech 2. Liga. After missing the autumn part of the 2010–11 Czech 2. Liga with injury, Gedeon marked his return to action in March 2011, scoring in a 5–0 win against Čáslav. In November 2012, Gedeon extended his contract with Dukla until the summer of 2015. He signed another contract extension in February 2015, this time until June 2016. In August 2015 he moved on loan to Most, the club which he had left seven years prior. Gedeon joined FC Chomutov on loan as an amateur player in the spring of 2016.

== International career ==
On 20 November 2002, Gedeon made his debut for the Czech Republic in a friendly match against Sweden, which finished 3–3. He subsequently played in February 2003 against France and played the whole 90 minutes of the match against Turkey in April 2003.

Despite being called up to the national squad by manager Karel Brückner for the September 2004 match against the Netherlands, Gedeon did not represent his country after 2003.

== Honours ==
Slavia Prague

- Czech Cup: 2001–02

Vaduz

- Liechtenstein Cup: 2005–06

Wisła Płock

- Polish Super Cup: 2006
