= Tomáš Borek =

Czech footballer

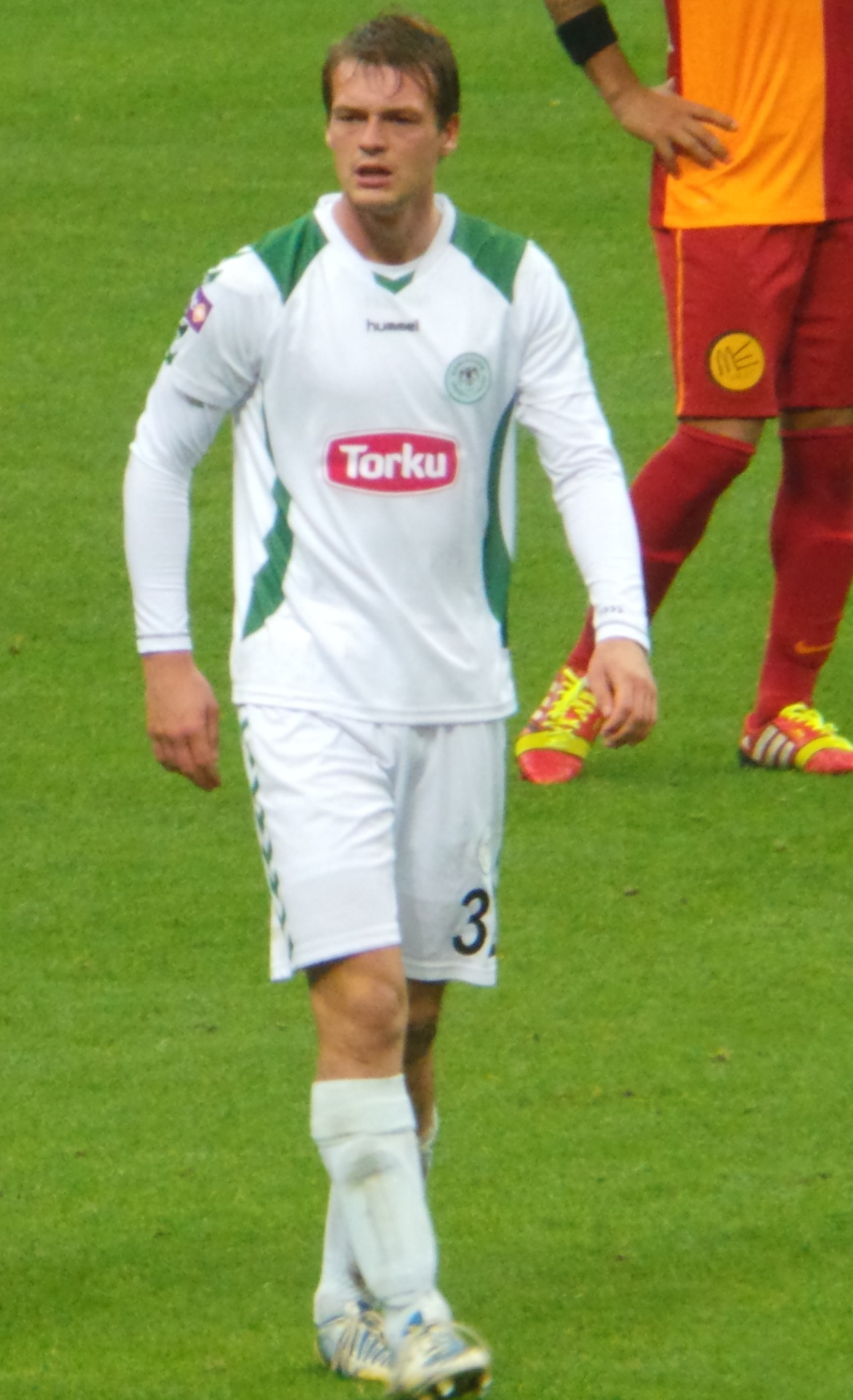
- Borek playing for Konyaspor in 2013

Personal information
- Date of birth: 4 April 1986 (age 40)
- Place of birth: Karlovy Vary, Czechoslovakia
- Height: 1.85 m (6 ft 1 in)
- Position: Midfielder

Team information
- Current team: SK Toužim

Youth career
- 1992–1998: SK Toužim
- 1998–2005: Viktoria Plzeň

Senior career*
Years	Team	Apps	(Gls)
2005–2008	Viktoria Plzeň	41	(3)
2008–2011	Příbram	55	(3)
2011	Zbrojovka Brno	11	(0)
2011–2012	Bohemians 1905	29	(1)
2012–2013	Dukla Prague	29	(7)
2013–2016	Konyaspor	23	(3)
2014–2015	→ Alanyaspor (loan)	16	(0)
2016	Příbram	5	(0)
2017	Znicz Pruszków	10	(0)
2017–2018	SK Lhota		
2018–2019	Viktorie Jirny		
2019	Český Brod		
2019–2022	FC Horky nad Jizerou		
2022	TJ Sokol Červené Janovice		
2022–	SK Toužim		

International career
2004	Czech Republic U18	5	(1)
2004–2005	Czech Republic U19	12	(1)
- * Club domestic league appearances and goals as of 4 April 2024

Tomáš Borek (born 4 April 1986) is a Czech professional footballer who plays as a midfielder for SK Toužim.

== Career ==
Borek scored 7 goals in 29 appearances for FK Dukla Prague in the 2012–13 Gambrinus liga.

Borek signed a three-year contract with Konyaspor in the summer of 2013.
