= Luboš Kalouda =

Czech footballer (born 1987)

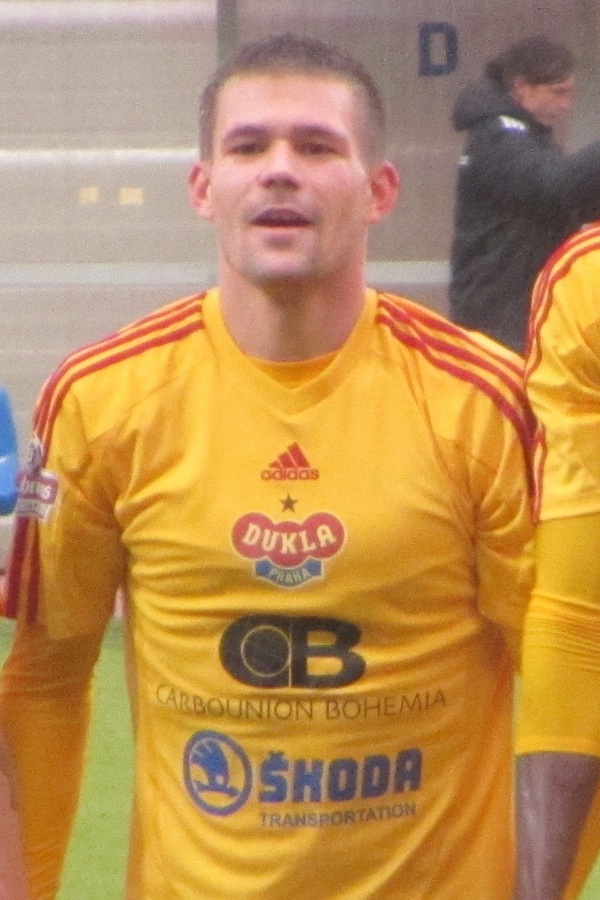
- Kalouda with Dukla Prague in 2013

Personal information
- Full name: Luboš Kalouda
- Date of birth: 20 May 1987 (age 39)
- Place of birth: Brno, Czechoslovakia
- Height: 1.76 m (5 ft 9 in)
- Position: Midfielder

Team information
- Current team: 1. FC Slovácko
- Number: 25

Youth career
- 2001–2006: 1. FC Brno

Senior career*
Years	Team	Apps	(Gls)
2006–2008	1. FC Brno	27	(5)
2008–2012	CSKA Moscow	6	(0)
2009–2010	→ Sparta Prague (loan)	16	(0)
2010	→ Volgar-Gazprom (loan)	7	(1)
2011	→ Oleksandriya (loan)	6	(0)
2012–2014	FK Dukla Prague	33	(4)
2014–2017	1. FC Slovácko	29	(7)

International career
2004	Czech Republic U18	4	(0)
2006	Czech Republic U19	1	(0)
2006–2007	Czech Republic U20	9	(3)
2007–2008	Czech Republic U21	8	(0)
- * Club domestic league appearances and goals

Luboš Kalouda (born 20 May 1987) is a Czech former footballer. He retired in 2018 at age 31 because of injury.

== Club career ==
Kalouda started his club career with Brno, where he made his Czech First League debut in a match against FK Teplice on 3 December 2006.

In January 2008 Brno were offered €4million by Juventus FC, who saw Kalouda as a possible long-term replacement for Nedvěd; however, the teams failed to reach an agreement. Despite interest from clubs including English Premier League team Newcastle United, Kalouda signed a five-year contract at PFC CSKA Moscow with a transfer fee of between 130 and 140 million CZK. However, he started playing for their youth team there and was injured.

A year later, it was announced that Kalouda would be returning to the Czech Republic on a year-long loan deal to Sparta Prague. His time at Sparta was limited by injury and he had an operation on a groin problem in January 2010, although he still managed to take part in 16 league matches over the course of the season.

Kalouda concluded his contract with CSKA in 2012, a year earlier than expected, having made just five league appearances for the Russian outfit in four years.

Kalouda signed for Dukla Prague as a free agent in July 2012 on a three-year contract. His contract with Dukla was terminated in April 2014, with the player having made a total of 33 league appearances for the club.

== International career ==
Kalouda was a member of the Czech Republic National U-20 Team which won silver medals in 2007 FIFA U-20 World Cup. Kalouda scored three goals (against Korea DPR, Panama and Spain) and was one of the best players in the Czech team. Due to his performances in autumn 2007 while playing for Brno, he was picked in January 2008 for the senior Czech national team for the first time by national team boss Karel Brückner. His style of play was compared to that of the legendary Czech midfielder Pavel Nedvěd.

== Career honours ==
Sparta Prague

- Czech First League: 2009/2010

PFC CSKA Moscow

- Russian Cup: 2009

International
Czech Rupublic U-21

- FIFA U-20 World Cup runner-up (1) 2007
