= Petr Malý =

Czech footballer

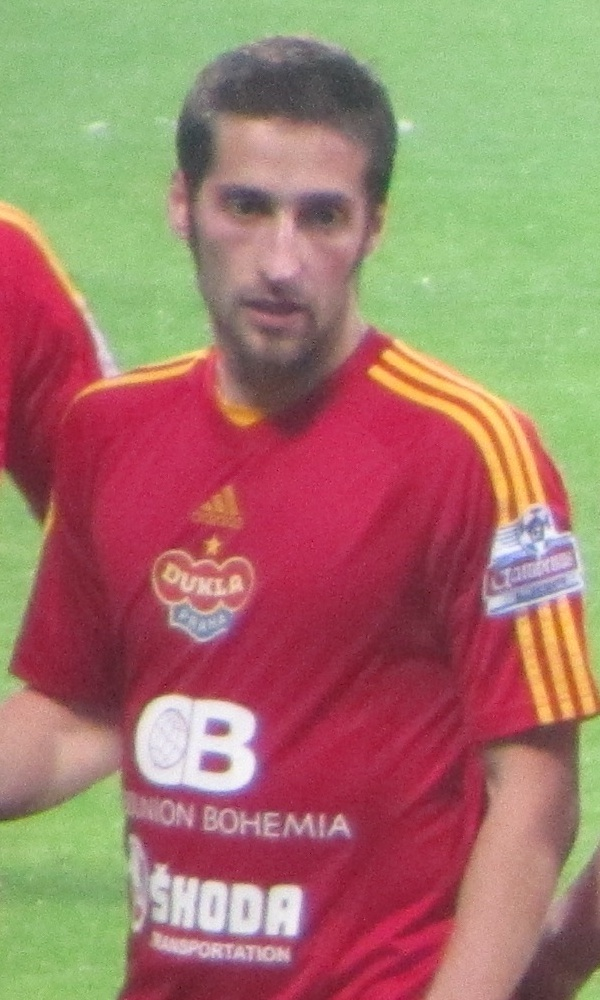
- Malý with Dukla in 2013

Personal information
- Date of birth: 1 June 1984 (age 42)
- Place of birth: Czechoslovakia
- Height: 1.79 m (5 ft 10 in)
- Position: Midfielder

Senior career*
Years	Team	Apps	(Gls)
2003–2008	Sparta Prague B		
2008–2015	FK Dukla Prague	151	(20)
- * Club domestic league appearances and goals

Petr Malý (born 1 June 1984) is a retired Czech football player who spent most of his professional career with FK Dukla Prague.

Malý started out with Sparta Prague, joining Dukla in 2008 after failing to break into the A-team. In November 2012, Malý extended his contract with Dukla until the summer of 2015. Malý collapsed eight minutes into a January 2014 friendly match against Táborsko, later resulting in a decision to end his professional playing career in October 2014. He took to the field in the last home game of the 2014–15 season, making a substitute appearance in the final minute of the 5–1 home win against Teplice.
