= Josef Marek =

Czech footballer

Personal information
- Date of birth: 11 June 1987 (age 39)
- Place of birth: Czech Republic
- Height: 1.91 m (6 ft 3 in)
- Position: Forward

Team information
- Current team: FC Oberlausitz Neugersdorf
- Number: 11

Senior career*
Years	Team	Apps	(Gls)
2009–2012	Kunice		
2011	→ Bohemians 1905 (loan)	3	(0)
2012	→ Dukla Prague (loan)	10	(0)
2012–2014	Dukla Prague	39	(2)
2014–2016	Viktoria Žižkov	16	(2)
2016–	FC Oberlausitz Neugersdorf	-	(-)
- * Club domestic league appearances and goals as of 31 December 2014

Josef Marek (born 11 June 1987) is a professional Czech football player who plays for FC Oberlausitz Neugersdorf.

== Career ==
Marek came to Bohemians for a trial while playing for third division side Kunice in January 2011. He went on to make three appearances for the club in the 2010–11 Gambrinus liga that season. Marek joined Dukla Prague on loan during the winter break of the 2011–12 season, before later signing a permanent contract.
