= Néstor Albiach =

Spanish footballer

Néstor
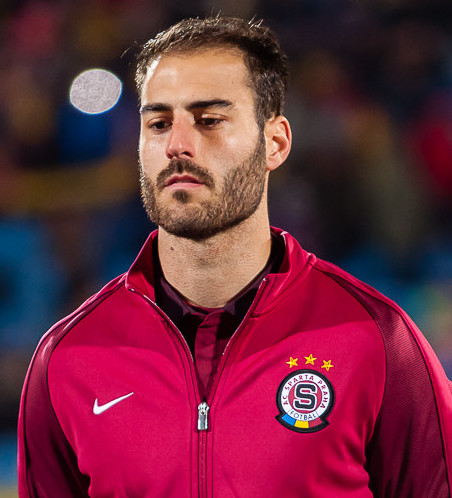
- Néstor with Sparta in 2017

Personal information
- Full name: Néstor Albiach Roger
- Date of birth: 18 August 1992 (age 34)
- Place of birth: Xirivella, Spain
- Height: 1.84 m (6 ft 0 in)
- Positions: Attacking midfielder; forward

Youth career
- Levante

Senior career*
Years	Team	Apps	(Gls)
2011–2012	Requena	39	(9)
2012–2013	Olímpic Xàtiva	20	(3)
2013–2016	Dukla Prague	69	(14)
2016–2019	Sparta Prague	10	(0)
2018	→ Dukla Prague (loan)	8	(0)
2019	Badalona	10	(4)
2019–2020	Numancia	16	(0)
2020–2021	Badalona	22	(4)
2021–2023	Rayo Majadahonda	66	(9)
2023–2025	NorthEast United	45	(11)
- * Club domestic league appearances and goals as of 12:34, 30 March 2025 (UTC)

Néstor Albiach Roger (born 18 August 1992), simply known as Néstor, is a Spanish professional footballer who plays as an attacking midfielder or forward.

== Club career ==
=== Early years ===
Born in Xirivella, Valencian Community, Néstor was a Levante UD youth graduate, but made his debut as a senior with SC Requena in the 2011–12 campaign, in Tercera División.

In August 2012 Néstor moved to Segunda División B side CD Olímpic de Xàtiva. On 25 January of the following year, after being an ever-present figure for the side, he rescinded his contract and signed a two-year deal with Czech First League side FK Dukla Prague.

=== Czech Republic ===
Néstor made his professional debut on 22 February 2013, starting in a 1–1 home draw for Dukla against FK Teplice. He scored his first league goals on 13 April, netting a brace in a 5–1 home routing of FK Jablonec.

Néstor was shortlisted for the league's Player of the Month award for May 2013, after having scored in wins against FC Zbrojovka Brno (3–2) and FK Mladá Boleslav (2–1) during the month. He was also elected as the best foreigner of the league in June.

Néstor sustained an injury during the winter break of the 2013–14 season, being sidelined until August 2014 when he came on as a substitute in a 1–2 defeat at FC Viktoria Plzeň. Despite having injury troubles with both knees, he remained at Dukla until the winter break of the 2016–17 season.

After scoring five goals for Dukla in the autumn part of the 2016–17 season, Néstor signed with Sparta Prague in December 2016, joining on a 2 1/2-year contract.

=== Badalona / Numancia ===
In January 2019, free agent Néstor returned to Spain and signed for CF Badalona in the third division. On 13 June 2019, he agreed to a two-year contract with CD Numancia in Segunda División.

On 7 September 2020, after appearing sparingly as his side suffered relegation, Néstor returned to his previous club Badalona.

== Career statistics ==
As of match played 27 April 2025

Club statistics
Club	Season	League			National cup		Other		Total	
Club	Season	Division	Apps	Goals	Apps	Goals	Apps	Goals	Apps	Goals
Olímpic Xàtiva	2012–13	Segunda División B	20	3	0	0	—		20	3
Dukla Prague	2012–13	Czech First League	13	4	0	0	—		13	4
Dukla Prague	2013–14	Czech First League	14	1	3	1	—		17	2
Dukla Prague	2014–15	Czech First League	10	1	0	0	—		10	1
Dukla Prague	2015–16	Czech First League	18	3	1	0	—		19	3
Dukla Prague	2016–17	Czech First League	14	5	2	0	—		16	5
Dukla Prague	Total		69	14	6	1	0	0	75	15
Sparta Prague	2016–17	Czech First League	6	0	0	0	2 (Note: Appearances in UEFA Europa League)	0	8	0
Sparta Prague	2017–18	Czech First League	4	0	1	0	—		5	0
Sparta Prague	Total		10	0	1	0	2	0	13	0
Dukla Prague (loan)	2017–18	Czech First League	8	0	0	0	—		8	0
Badalona	2018–19	Segunda División B	10	4	0	0	—		10	4
Numancia	2019–20	Segunda División	16	0	1	1	—		17	1
Badalona	2020–21	Segunda División B	22	4	0	0	—		22	4
Rayo Majadahonda	2021–22	Primera División RFEF	31	0	3	0	1 (Note: Appearance in promotion playoffs)	1	35	1
Rayo Majadahonda	2022–23	Primera Federación	35	9	1	0	—		36	9
Rayo Majadahonda	Total		66	9	4	0	1	1	71	10
NorthEast United	2023–24	Indian Super League	20	5	3	3	3 (Note: Appearances in Durand Cup)	0	26	8
NorthEast United	2024–25	Indian Super League	25	6	2	1	6	1	33	8
NorthEast United	Total		45	11	5	4	9	1	59	16
Career total			266	45	17	6	12	2	295	53

== Honours ==
NorthEast United

- Durand Cup: 2024
