= Tomáš Berger =

Czech footballer

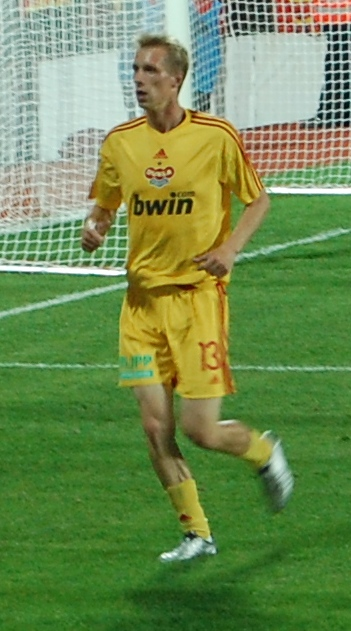

Personal information
- Date of birth: 22 August 1985 (age 41)
- Place of birth: Prague, Czechoslovakia
- Height: 1.80 m (5 ft 11 in)
- Position: Midfielder

Youth career
- Sparta Prague

Senior career*
Years	Team	Apps	(Gls)
2007–2016	FK Dukla Prague	166	(33)
2012	→ FC Viktoria Plzeň (loan)	4	(0)
2016– 2017	Bohemians 1905	19	(2)
- * Club domestic league appearances and goals

Tomáš Berger (born 22 August 1985) is a Czech former football player, who played for FK Dukla Prague, FC Viktoria Plzeň and Bohemians 1905.

Berger joined Dukla from Sparta Prague, playing for the club in the Prague Championship before its progression into professional football.

In the 2011–12 season, Berger played top-flight football for the first time. He played in all 16 of Dukla's matches before the winter break, scoring twice. In January 2012, Berger moved on loan to FC Viktoria Plzeň for six months, with the option of a permanent transfer.

On 16 February 2012, Berger made his competitive debut for Plzeň, coming on as a substitute in the 2011–12 UEFA Europa League knockout phase match against FC Schalke 04. Berger made a total of four league appearances in the spring half of the season, playing a total of 42 minutes of league football. This was in addition to 32 minutes played across two Europa League fixtures. Berger returned to Dukla in the summer of 2012.

Berger scored 10 league goals in the 2015–16 season. In June 2016, his contract with Dukla expired and he signed a two-year contract as a free agent with Prague-based Bohemians 1905. Following the 2016–17 season, in which he scored two goals in 19 games for Bohemians, mainly appearing as a substitute, Berger and the club agreed to terminate his contract a year early.

== Personal life ==
Berger is the son of Sparta Prague legend Jan Berger, who also played for Dukla Prague.
