= Ismaël Ouedraogo =

Burkinabé footballer

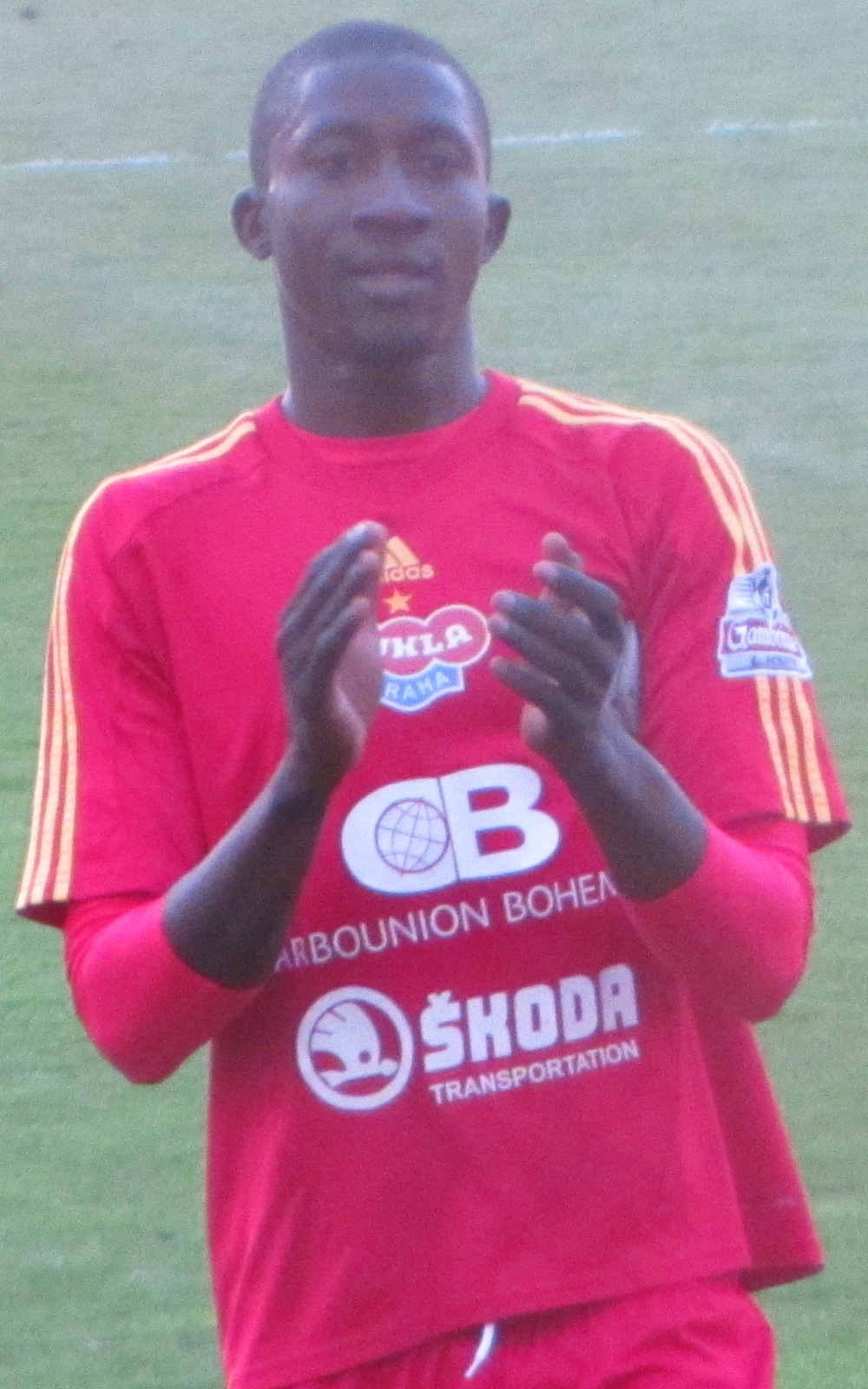

Personal information
- Date of birth: 10 March 1991 (age 35)
- Place of birth: Burkina Faso
- Height: 1.89 m (6 ft 2 1/2 in)
- Position: Midfielder

Senior career*
Years	Team	Apps	(Gls)
- US Ouagadougou
2012–2015	Dukla Prague	14	(1)
2014	→ Baník Sokolov (loan)	10	(2)

International career^{‡}
2014–	Burkina Faso	0	(0)
- * Club domestic league appearances and goals as of 31 May 2015 ‡ National team caps and goals as of 31 May 2015

Ismaël Wandepanga Ouedraogo (born 10 March 1991) is a Burkinabé professional footballer who plays as a midfielder. He played for Czech clubs Dukla Prague and Baník Sokolov. Ouedraogo joined Dukla in 2012 from US Ouagadougou, a club in the capital city of his country. Ouedraogo was called up to the Burkina Faso national football team in May 2014. He joined Baník Sokolov on loan during the summer of 2014.
