= Pavel Radoš =

Czech footballer (born 1991)

Personal information
- Date of birth: 28 January 1991 (age 35)
- Place of birth: Prague, Czechoslovakia
- Position: Defender

Team information
- Current team: Vlašim
- Number: 19

Senior career*
Years	Team	Apps	(Gls)
2012–2015	FK Dukla Prague	0	(0)
2013	→ Táborsko (loan)	7	(0)
2014	→ Vlašim (loan)	13	(0)
2014–2015	→ Vlašim (loan)	7	(0)
2015–	Vlašim	13	(0)
- * Club domestic league appearances and goals as of 30 June 2015

Pavel Radoš (born 28 January 1991) is a professional Czech football player who currently plays for Vlašim.

Radoš joined Vlašim on loan from Dukla in January 2014 on a half-year loan. He then returned to Vlašim, this time on a season-long loan, in the summer of 2014.
