= Tomáš Gavlák =

Slovak footballer

Personal information
- Full name: Tomáš Gavlák
- Date of birth: 15 September 1985 (age 41)
- Place of birth: Čadca, Czechoslovakia
- Height: 1.94 m (6 ft 4 1/2 in)
- Position: Striker

Team information
- Current team: FK Fotbal Třinec

Senior career*
Years	Team	Apps	(Gls)
- FK Čadca
- Žilina B
2008	Zlín	1	(0)
2008–2011	FK Bodva	?	(28)
2011–2014	Fotbal Třinec	28?	(4?)
- * Club domestic league appearances and goals as of 30 November 2012

Tomáš Gavlák (born 15 September 1985 in Čadca) is a Slovak football forward. Gavlák played one match for Zlín in the 2007–08 Gambrinus liga. He went on to FK Bodva Moldava nad Bodvou where he was the top scorer for two consecutive seasons., although the club stopped playing in the second tier after the 2011–12 Slovak Second Football League. In 2011, he headed to Czech 2. liga club FK Fotbal Třinec, where he played for a season until Třinec's relegation in 2012.
