= Tomislav Božić =

Croatian footballer (born 1987)

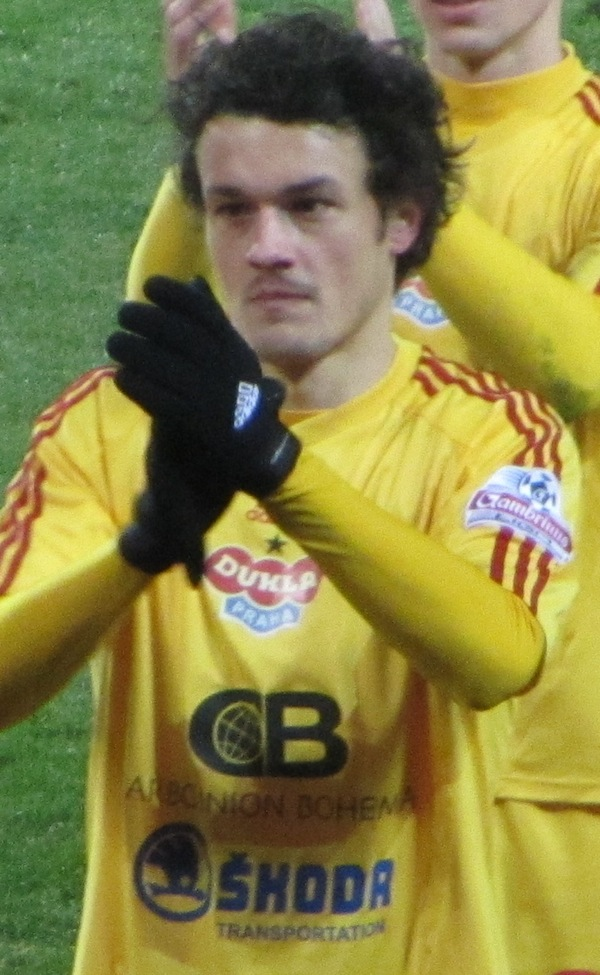

Personal information
- Date of birth: 1 November 1987 (age 39)
- Place of birth: Slavonska Požega, SR Croatia, SFR Yugoslavia
- Height: 1.84 m (6 ft 1/2 in)
- Position: Defender

Team information
- Current team: Slaven Belupo
- Number: 6

Youth career
- 2002–2005: Kamen Ingrad

Senior career*
Years	Team	Apps	(Gls)
2005–2007	Kamen Ingrad	36	(0)
2007–2009	Široki Brijeg	41	(1)
2009–2010	Suhopolje	22	(4)
2010–2011	Cibalia	22	(0)
2011	HNK Gorica	10	(0)
2012–2014	Dukla Prague	56	(1)
2014–2016	Górnik Łęczna	58	(0)
2016–2017	Wisła Płock	21	(1)
2017–2019	Miedź Legnica	51	(0)
2019–	Slaven Belupo	188	(10)

International career
2006	Croatia U19	2	(0)
2006–2007	Croatia U20	4	(0)
2007	Croatia U21	1	(0)
- * Club domestic league appearances and goals as of 15 June 2026

Tomislav Božić (born 1 November 1987) is a Croatian professional footballer who plays as a defender for Slaven Belupo in the Croatian First Football League. He has represented his country at youth level.

== Club career ==
=== Early career ===
Božić began his professional career with the Croatian first level side NK Kamen Ingrad for whom he appeared 34 times in the 2005–06 and 2006–07 1.HNL seasons, before moving abroad and joining the Bosnian side NK Široki Brijeg. In August 2009, he returned to Croatia and joined the Druga HNL side HNK Suhopolje on a free transfer. In summer 2010, Božić played on trial at the Czech club Slavia Prague, scoring in a friendly match against Plzeň but ultimately not joining the club. He then joined the Prva HNL side HNK Cibalia Vinkovci where he was a regular first-team member for one season. In 2011, Božić joined HNK Gorica in the Croatian Druga HNL.

=== Czech Republic ===
After an unsuccessful trial with Viktoria Plzeň, he signed with Dukla Prague, a team newly promoted to the Czech Gambrinus liga, in January 2012. In January 2013, he signed a contract extension, keeping him at Dukla until summer 2014. Božić scored his first Gambrinus liga goal for Dukla in March 2013, in the second half of a 4–0 home win against the bottom-of-the-league team České Budějovice.

=== Slaven Belupo ===
On 3 July 2019, Božić joined Slaven Belupo.

== International career ==
Božić was capped seven times for Croatia's U-19, U-20 and U-21 national teams between 2006 and 2007.

== Personal life ==
Božić is married and has a son.

== Honours ==
Miedź Legnica

- I liga: 2017–18
