= Lukáš Štetina =

Slovak footballer

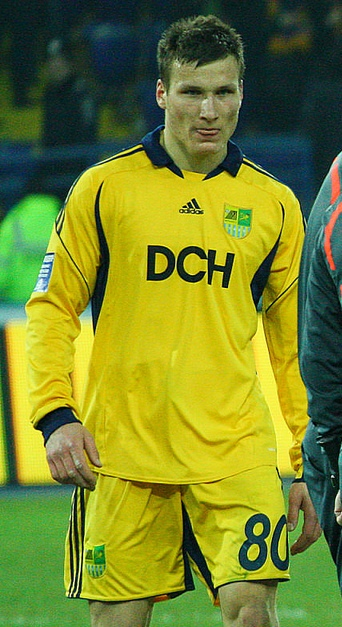
- Štetina with Metalist Kharkiv in 2011

Personal information
- Date of birth: 28 July 1991 (age 35)
- Place of birth: Nitra, Czechoslovakia
- Height: 1.85 m (6 ft 1 in)
- Position: Centre-back

Team information
- Current team: Nitra

Youth career
- Nitra

Senior career*
Years	Team	Apps	(Gls)
2009–2011	Nitra	41	(2)
2011–2013	Metalist Kharkiv	2	(0)
2012	→ Tatran Prešov (loan)	14	(1)
2012–2013	→ Dukla Prague (loan)	21	(0)
2013–2017	Dukla Prague	85	(6)
2017–2022	Sparta Prague	58	(3)
2022	→ Slovan Liberec (loan)	5	(0)
2022–2025	Spartak Trnava	70	(1)
2025–	Nitra	34	(4)

International career
2009–2010	Slovakia U19	3	(0)
2010–2013	Slovakia U21	21	(3)
2013–2020	Slovakia	4	(1)
- * Club domestic league appearances and goals as of 29 May 2026

Lukáš Štetina (Slovak pronunciation: [ˈlukaːʂ ˈʂcecina]; born 28 July 1991) is a Slovak footballer who currently plays for FC Nitra.

== Club career ==
=== Early career ===
Štetina made his Corgoň Liga debut for FC Nitra in a 1–1 draw against MŠK Žilina on 11 July 2009. He scored his first goal in a 2–0 win against Dunajská Streda. He played 24 matches in his first Corgoň Liga season. In the next season he made 18 appearances for Nitra and then was transferred to Ukrainian club Metalist Kharkiv in March 2011.

=== Metalist Kharkiv ===
Štetina debuted in the Ukrainian Premier League in a 0–0 draw against Vorskla on 5 March 2011. He played only two matches in the 2010–11 season and failed to make a league appearance in the 2011–12 season. He returned to Slovakia in February 2012, signing a half-year loan deal with Tatran Prešov. Štetina joined Czech club Dukla Prague on a year's loan in July 2012, making his Czech First League debut on 28 July 2012, playing four minutes as a substitute in a 1–1 draw against Sparta Prague.

=== Later career ===
Štetina transferred to Dukla Prague and signed a three-year contract in July 2013, then AC Sparta Prague in 2017.

After years of playing abroad, Štetina returned to his homeland and signed for Spartak Trnava in June 2022. He scored a scissors goal in a 2023–24 UEFA Europa Conference League third qualifying round against Lech Poznań on 18 August 2023, sending Spartak Trnava to the next round. On 2 July 2024, Štetina signed a new contract with the club which kept him until 2025.

On 16 May 2025, Štetina announced his retirement from professional football.

On 3 July 2025, it was announced that Štetina would be returning to his former club FC Nitra, now playing in the 4th division.

== International career ==
Štetina represented various Slovak youth teams, debuting in the 2008 UEFA European Under-17 Football Championship elite round, making his competitive debut against Serbia on 26 March 2008.

At senior level, Štetina made his debut for the Slovakia in an infamous goalless friendly draw against Gibraltar in November 2013. It was another four years before he played his next match for his country, scoring the opening goal of the game after ten minutes but being substituted at half time in a November 2017 friendly match in Lviv against Ukraine.

Štetina returned to the national team in March 2019 after the international retirement of Martin Škrtel, having been called up for a double UEFA Euro 2020 qualifying fixture against Hungary and Wales.

=== International goals ===
International goals by date, venue, cap, opponent, score, result and competition
No.	Date	Venue	Cap	Opponent	Score	Result	Competition
1	10 November 2017	Arena Lviv, Lviv, Ukraine	2	Ukraine	1–0	1–2	Friendly

== Honours ==
=== Club ===
Sparta Prague

- Czech Cup: 2019–20

Spartak Trnava

- Slovak Cup: 2022–23, 2024–25
