= Igor Obert =

Slovak football defender (born 1982)

Personal information
- Full name: Igor Obert
- Date of birth: 14 July 1982 (age 44)
- Place of birth: Partizánske, Czechoslovakia
- Height: 1.85 m (6 ft 1 in)
- Position: Right back

Team information
- Current team: KFC Komárno
- Number: 6

Senior career*
Years	Team	Apps	(Gls)
- FK Tempo Partizánske
- FK Radvaň
- FK Tempo Partizánske
- Topoľčany
- FK Žiar nad Hronom
–2007	Šaľa		
2007–2010	MFK Dubnica	84	(0)
2010–2011	→ DAC Dunajská Streda loan	29	(0)
2011	Olympiacos Volos	0	(0)
2011	DAC Dunajská Streda	7	(0)
2012–2013	Jihlava	24	(2)
2013–2014	Michalovce	17	(1)
2014–2015	Svätý Jur		
2014–2015	→ Veľký Meder (loan)		
2015	Veľký Meder		
2016	Komárno		

Managerial career
- 2020: ŠKF Sereď (assistant)
- 2021-: FC Nitra (assistant)
- * Club domestic league appearances and goals as of 10 September 2016

Igor Obert (born 14 July 1982 in Partizánske) is a Slovak football defender who currently plays for KFC Komárno. His former club were MŠK - Thermál Veľký Meder, ŠK Svätý Jur, MFK Zemplín Michalovce, FC Vysočina Jihlava and FK DAC 1904 Dunajská Streda and Olympiacos Volos.
