= Jan Svatonský =

Czech footballer

Personal information
- Date of birth: 12 May 1984 (age 42)
- Place of birth: Czechoslovakia
- Height: 1.80 m (5 ft 11 in)
- Position: Forward

Senior career*
Years	Team	Apps	(Gls)
2006–2007	Baník Ostrava	2	(0)
2006–2007	→ Jakubčovice (loan)	23	(3)
2007–2013	FK Dukla Prague	118	(14)
2013–2014	MFK Karviná	23	(2)
2014–2015	SFC Opava	27	(0)
- * Club domestic league appearances and goals

Jan Svatonský (born 12 May 1984) is a Czech former professional football player who played in the Czech First League for Baník Ostrava and FK Dukla Prague. After a season with MFK Karviná, he joined SFC Opava on a two-year deal in the summer of 2014.
