= Zbyněk Pospěch =

Czech footballer

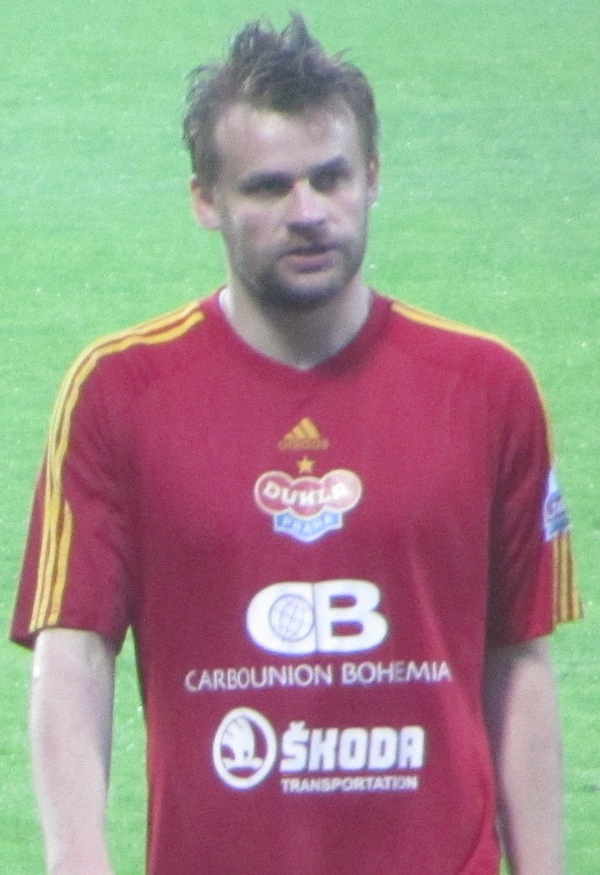

Personal information
- Full name: Zbyněk Pospěch
- Date of birth: 24 October 1982 (age 44)
- Place of birth: Opava, Czechoslovakia
- Height: 1.88 m (6 ft 2 in)
- Position: Striker

Team information
- Current team: SV Oberndorf
- Number: 10

Senior career*
Years	Team	Apps	(Gls)
1999–2004	Opava	35	(6)
2004–2005	Slovácko	20	(3)
2005–2006	AC Sparta Praha	0	(0)
2005–2007	Slovan Liberec	39	(8)
2007	Odd Grenland	19	(4)
2008	Artmedia Bratislava	21	(6)
2009–2011	Brno	7	(2)
2009	→ Opava (loan)	6	(3)
2011	→ Slavia Prague (loan)	12	(7)
2011–2012	Slavia Prague	22	(6)
2012–2014	Dukla Prague	57	(25)
2014–2015	Energie Cottbus	24	(5)
2015	Opava	9	(5)
2016	Karviná	9	(5)
2017	Valašské Meziříčí	?	(?)
2017	SK Detmarovice	?	(?)
2018–	SV Oberndorf	13	(5)

International career
2002	Czech Republic U20	1	(0)
- * Club domestic league appearances and goals as of 3 June 2018

Zbyněk Pospěch (born 24 October 1982) is a Czech football forward who plays for SV Oberndorf in Austria.

== Career ==
Pospěch started his career with hometown side Opava, where he spent five years before later playing top-flight football for Slovácko and Slovan Liberec. He then headed out of the Czech Republic, spending time at Odd Grenland in Norway and Artmedia Bratislava in Slovakia. In 2009, he returned to the Czech Republic to play for Brno.

Pospěch joined Second League side Opava in September 2009, five years after having left his boyhood club. In November 2009, the Czech Disciplinary Commission suspended Pospěch, which left him unable to play professional football until October 2010.

Pospěch moved on loan from Brno to Slavia Prague in February 2011 until the end of June. Pospěch missed almost two years of league football before scoring on his return to action in a 1–0 win for Slavia Prague against former club Slovan Liberec in March 2011. He finished the spring part of the 2010–11 Czech First League as Slavia's top scorer with seven goals. In June 2011, as his loan was coming to an end, he signed a three-year contract with Slavia. Despite scoring a total of 13 league goals in a season and a half with Slavia, making him their leading scorer, Slavia terminated Pospěch's contract in June 2012, leaving him free to look for a new club.

After signing for Dukla Prague in the summer of 2012, Pospěch took until October 2012 to score his first league goal for the club, which came in a 1–0 win against Hradec Králové. He finished the season with 9 goals from 28 matches. Pospěch scored four goals in a match, becoming just the fifth player in the history of the Czech league to do so, in July 2013 during Dukla's 4–0 win against Sigma Olomouc. He finished the month in second place in the league's Player of the Month competition behind Plzeň striker Tomáš Wágner. In his second season at Dukla, he scored 16 goals, becoming the second highest scorer in the league for the season.

Pospěch signed a two-year contract with German 3. Liga club Energie Cottbus in July 2014.
