= Jan Pázler =

Czech footballer

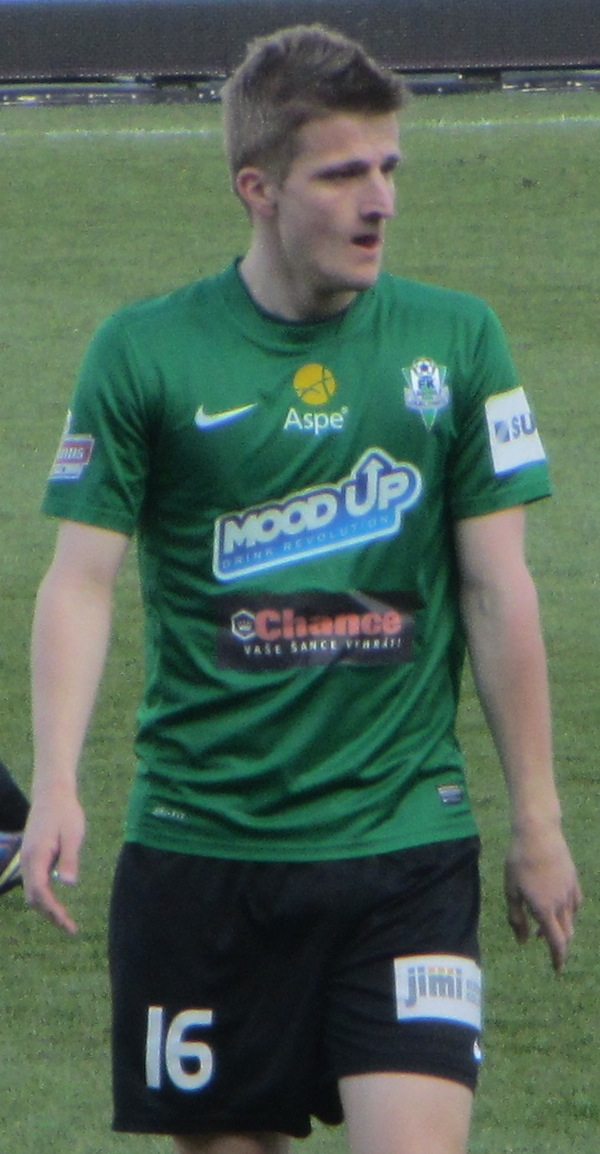
- Pázler with Jablonec in 2013

Personal information
- Date of birth: 10 January 1991 (age 35)
- Place of birth: Náchod, Czechoslovakia
- Height: 1.82 m (6 ft 0 in)
- Position: Forward

Youth career
- 1998–2001: Náchod
- 2001–2010: Slavia Prague

Senior career*
Years	Team	Apps	(Gls)
2010	Slavia Prague	1	(0)
2011–2012	Dukla Prague	39	(8)
2012–2014	Jablonec	12	(1)
2012–2013	→ Dukla Prague (loan)	12	(2)
2013	→ Dukla Prague (loan)	7	(0)
2014–2015	Znojmo	29	(9)
2015–2018	Hradec Králové	80	(43)
2018–2020	Liberec	22	(2)
2019–2020	→ Zbrojovka Brno (loan)	7	(1)
2020–2021	FK Viktoria Žižkov	6	(0)
2021–2022	Dukla Prague	22	(1)
2022	Olympia Radotín	5	(1)

International career
2009	Czech Republic U18	2	(0)
2012	Czech Republic U21	3	(0)

Managerial career
- 2023–: Dukla Prague (organizational manager)
- * Club domestic league appearances and goals

Jan Pázler (born 10 January 1991) is a former Czech football player who played for various clubs in the Czech First League and Czech National Football League. He was twice top scorer of the National League. Pázler represented his country at under-21 level.

== Career ==
Pázler joined Dukla Prague in the winter break of the 2010–11 season from city rivals Slavia Prague. He signed for Jablonec in the summer of 2012 but remained at Dukla on a season-long loan. In January 2013, during the league's winter break, his departure to Jablonec was confirmed. Towards the end of the season Pázler was involved in the final of the 2012–13 Czech Cup, although he remained an unused substitute in the match, which resulted in Jablonec winning the trophy.

It was announced in July 2013 that Pázler would play for Dukla on loan during the autumn part of the 2013–14 season. He returned to Jablonec in January 2014 during the league's winter break. In the summer of 2014, Pázler left Jablonec, signing with recently relegated Znojmo to play in the Czech 2. Liga.

Pázler spent three more seasons in the Czech National Football League with Hradec Králové, during which time he was the league's top scorer twice. However the club were not able to win promotion to the First League. He subsequently returned to the Czech First League with Liberec, but scored just two goals for his new club before returning to the second league to join FC Zbrojovka Brno on one year buy option loan in August 2019. After spending time with Viktoria Žižkov, Pázler rejoined Dukla in the summer of 2021.

=== Later career ===
In 2022, Pázler had a short spell at Olympia Radotín. In January 2023, Pázler was appointed organizational manager at his former club, Dukla Prague.

== Career statistics ==
As of 30 June 2022.

Club	Season	League		Cup		Total	
Club	Season	Apps	Goals	Apps	Goals	Apps	Goals
Slavia Prague	2010–11	1	0	0	0	1	0
Dukla Prague	2010–11	13	2	0	0	13	2
Dukla Prague	2011–12	26	6	2	0	28	6
Dukla Prague	2012–13	12	2	3	2	15	4
Jablonec	2012–13	10	1	3	0	13	1
Jablonec	2013–14	2	0	1	0	3	0
Dukla Prague	2013–14	7	0	3	2	10	2
Znojmo	2014–15	29	9	3	0	32	9
Hradec Králové	2015–16	25	17	3	1	28	18
Hradec Králové	2016–17	25	5	1	0	26	5
Hradec Králové	2017–18	30	21	2	2	32	23
Slovan Liberec	2018–19	20	2	1	0	21	2
Slovan Liberec	2019–20	2	0	0	0	2	0
Zbrojovka Brno	2019–20	7	1	1	0	8	1
Viktoria Žižkov	2020–21	6	0	1	0	7	0
Dukla Prague	2021–22	22	1	1	0	23	1
Career total		237	67	25	7	262	74
