= FK Dukla Prague =

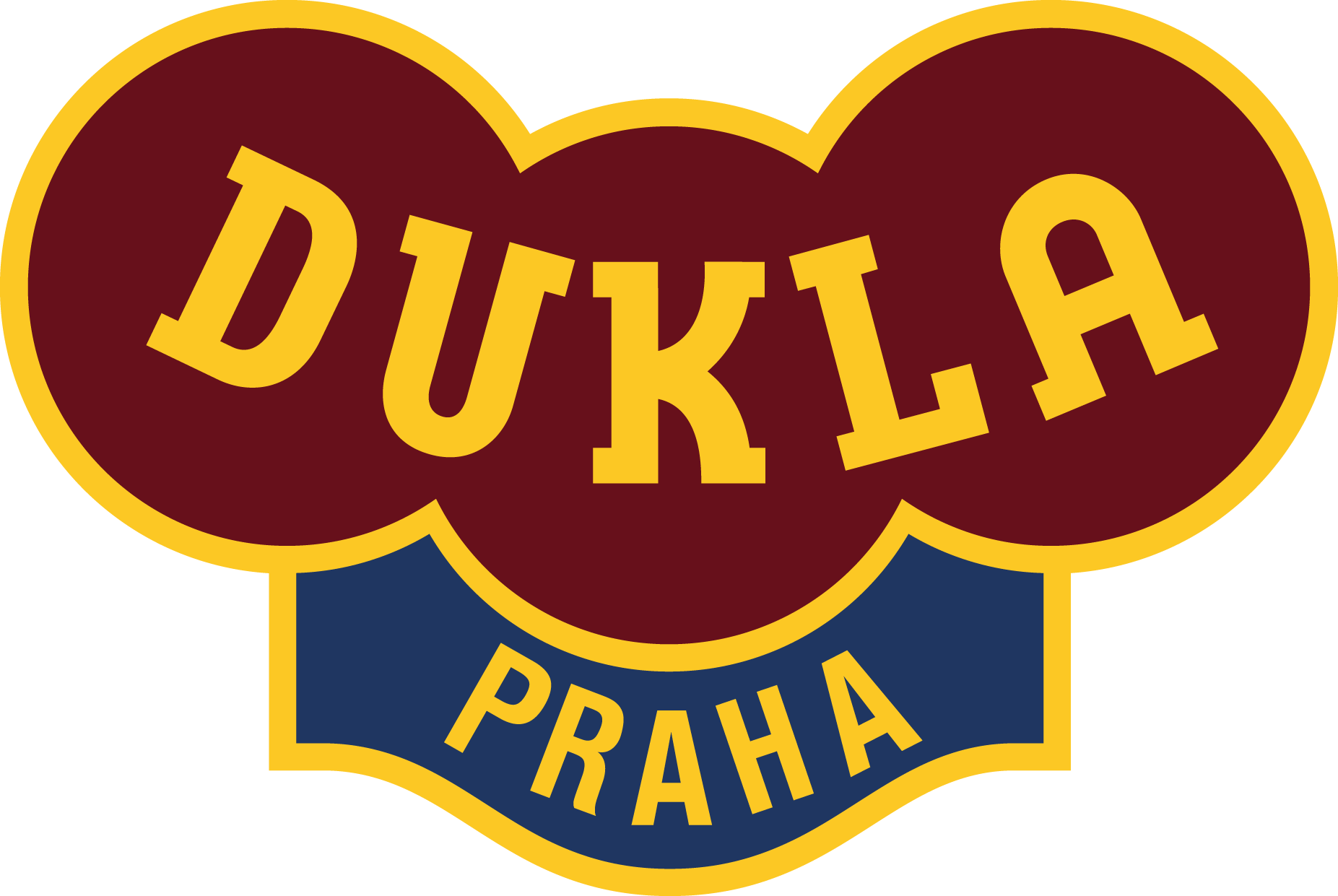
- Full name: Fotbalový klub Dukla Praha, a.s.
- Founded: 1948; 78 years ago (ATK Prague)
- Ground: Stadion Juliska
- Capacity: 8,150
- Chairman: Matěj Turek
- Manager: Pavel Šustr
- League: Czech National Football League
- 2025–26: Czech First League, 16th of 16 (relegated)
- Website: www.fkdukla.cz
Home colours	Away colours

FK Dukla Prague (Czech: FK Dukla Praha) is a Czech association football club based in the Dejvice area of Prague. It currently plays in the Czech National Football League, the second tier of Czech club football.

The club played in local competitions between 2001 and 2007, when it gained entry to the country's second league. A four-year spell in the second league followed, culminating in the club winning the league in 2011 and being promoted to the Czech First League, where it remained until relegation in 2019. In 2024, they were promoted to the first league again.

== History ==
The club was founded in 1958 as FK Dukla Dejvice and advanced to the Prague Championship in the 1983–84 season. Prior to 2001, the club's best finish in a season had been second in the Prague Championship in the 1984–85 season. In 2001 the club became known as FK Dukla Prague, but not the legal successor of the original Dukla Prague team, which had merged in 1996 to finally become 1. FK Příbram.

The club finished 14th in the 2001–02 Prague Championship and in the same position the following season. It then had a season in the sixth level of Czech football, the 1.A třída. Petr Benetka led the club to the league title in 2003–04, signalling a return for the club to the Prague Championship. The club finished in second place in the 2004–05 season but 13th the following season. In April 2006, Dukla's president Milan Doruška promised that the club would rise up the league system. In November 2006, Dukla Prague management announced that it had agreed to a takeover of second league rights of the Jakubčovice team and in 2007 Dukla took Jakubčovice's place in the Czech 2. Liga, having finished the 2006–07 season in second place.

Dukla Prague played in the Czech 2. Liga from the 2007–08 season, playing their first 2. Liga match on 4 August 2007, which they lost to Opava by a 2–1 scoreline. After four seasons, they won the division and gained promotion to the top flight for the 2011–12 season. Dukla then spent eight years in the First League before being relegated after the 2018–19 season.

== Club symbols and references ==
The club wear yellow and red, the traditional colours of the club. In October 2008, the club wore black shirts in a league match against Baník Most to commemorate the death of Josef Hájek, the man responsible for the return of league football to Dukla.

In 1986, British band Half Man Half Biscuit released "All I Want for Christmas is a Dukla Prague Away Kit" as a B-side to their single "The Trumpton Riots." The song has since become a cult favourite of fans, later appearing on The Trumpton Riots EP and reissues of Back in the DHSS, creating both a demand for Dukla Prague kits and a group of supporters of the club amongst the band's fanbase.

== Stadium ==
Dukla play home matches at Stadion Juliska in the Dejvice area of Prague. Occasionally the club has used other stadiums, for example in 2011 Dukla used nearby Stadion Evžena Rošického for two matches due to redevelopment work at Juliska.

== Players ==
=== Current squad ===
As of 17 October 2026.

Note: Flags indicate national team as defined under FIFA eligibility rules; some limited exceptions apply. Players may hold more than one non-FIFA nationality.

No.	Pos.	Nation	Player
1	GK	CZE	Daniel Bašta
5	MF	USA	Diego Velasquez
6	DF	CZE	Ondřej Lilling
7	FW	CZE	Tomáš Schánělec
8	MF	CZE	Pavel Gaszczyk
9	FW	CZE	Michal Kroupa
10	MF	SVK	Rajmund Mikuš
11	FW	MLI	Boubou Diallo
12	MF	CZE	Martin Ambler
13	MF	CZE	Lukáš Kostka
14	FW	GAM	Pa Assan Corr (on loan from Dunajská Streda)
15	DF	CZE	Matěj Hanousek
17	FW	BEN	Olatoundji Tessilimi
19	MF	USA	Evan Rotundo
20	MF	CZE	Jakub Plšek
21	MF	SWE	Seif Ali Hindi

No.	Pos.	Nation	Player
22	MF	CZE	Štěpán Šebrle
23	DF	CZE	Jaroslav Svozil
25	MF	NGR	Jonathan Okebugwu
26	MF	SVK	Jakub Kadák
27	DF	POL	Antoni Franke
28	MF	USA	Diego Zarate
29	FW	AUT	Namory Cissé
30	FW	NGR	Chinonso Emeka
31	GK	CZE	Adam Jágrik
32	MF	SVK	Christián Bačinský
37	DF	SVK	Michal Tomič (on loan from Spartak Trnava)
39	DF	CZE	Daniel Kozma
55	DF	AUT	Mateo Karamatic
59	GK	CZE	Hugo Jan Bačkovský
77	FW	CRO	Ante Matić

=== Out on loan ===
Note: Flags indicate national team as defined under FIFA eligibility rules; some limited exceptions apply. Players may hold more than one non-FIFA nationality.

No.	Pos.	Nation	Player
—	DF	SRB	Zlatan Šehović (at Čukarički)
—	FW	FRA	Jacques Fokam (at Ogre United)
—	MF	CZE	Matěj Žitný (at Viktoria Žižkov)
—	DF	CZE	Dominik Hašek (at Viktoria Žižkov)

No.	Pos.	Nation	Player
—	MF	CZE	Jiří Hrubeš (at Vlašim)
—	MF	CZE	Michal Černák (at Prostějov)
—	FW	CZE	Tomáš Jedlička (at Příbram)
—	MF	NGR	Samson Tijani (at Podbrezová)

== Reserves ==
As of 2025–26, Dukla's reserve team FK Dukla Prague B plays in the Bohemian Football League (3rd tier of Czech football system).

== Current technical staff ==
As of 5 September 2026.

Position	Name
Head coach	Pavel Šustr
Assistant coach	Jakub Harant
Goalkeeper coach	Filip Rada

== Managers ==
The following individuals have managed the club since 2001.

- Eduard Jůza (2001–2002)
- Jaromír Jarůšek (2002)
- Jan Nový (2002)
- Radomír Sokol (2002–2003)
- Pavel Korejčík (2003)
- Radomír Sokol (2003)
- Petr Benetka (2003–2005)
- Jan Berger (2005)
- Salem Hebousse (2005–2006)
- Günter Bittengel (2006–2009)
- Luboš Kozel (2009–2016)
- Jaroslav Šilhavý (2016)
- Jaroslav Hynek (2016–2018)
- Pavel Drsek (2018)
- Roman Skuhravý (2018–2021)
- Bohuslav Pilný (2021–2022)
- Petr Rada (2022–2025)
- David Holoubek (2025–2026)
- Pavel Šustr (2026–present)

== History in domestic competitions ==
- 2004–2007: Prague Championship
- 2007–2011: Czech 2. Liga
- 2011–2019: Czech First League
- 2019–2024: Czech 2. Liga
- 2024–2026: Czech First League

- Seasons spent at Level 1 of the football league system: 9
- Seasons spent at Level 2 of the football league system: 6
- Seasons spent at Level 3 of the football league system: 0
- Seasons spent at Level 4 of the football league system: 0

=== Czech Republic ===
Season	League	Placed	Pld	W	D	L	GF	GA	GD	Pts	Cup
2003–04	6. liga	1st									–
2004–05	5. liga	2nd	30	20	4	6	90	46	+44	64	–
2005–06	5. liga	13th	30	9	6	15	59	67	–8	33	–
2006–07	5. liga	2nd	30	20	6	4	83	33	+50	66	–
2007–08	2. liga	14th	30	9	9	15	36	44	–8	33	Round of 32
2008–09	2. liga	5th	30	12	10	8	37	25	+12	46	Round of 64
2009–10	2. liga	6th	30	12	8	10	45	41	+4	44	Round of 32
2010–11	2. liga	1st	30	18	9	3	55	18	+37	63	Round of 32
2011–12	1. liga	6th	30	11	9	10	42	35	+7	42	Round of 16
2012–13	1. liga	6th	30	11	13	6	48	37	+11	46	Round of 16
2013–14	1. liga	7th	30	10	8	12	35	37	–2	38	Quarter-finals
2014–15	1. liga	6th	30	11	8	11	34	40	–6	41	Round of 64
2015–16	1. liga	10th	30	8	11	11	44	41	+3	35	Quarter-finals
2016–17	1. liga	7th	30	11	7	12	39	35	+4	40	Round of 16
2017–18	1. liga	11th	30	9	5	16	32	55	–23	32	Round of 32
2018–19	1. liga	16th	35	5	7	23	30	72	–42	22	Round of 16
2019–20	2. liga	3rd	30	19	2	9	62	40	+22	59	Round of 16
2020–21	2. liga	8th	26	9	7	10	36	30	+6	34	Round of 32
2021–22	2. liga	9th	30	10	9	11	40	41	–1	39	Round of 32
2022–23	2. liga	4th	30	14	5	11	51	45	+6	47	Round of 32
2023–24	2. liga	1st	30	18	6	6	55	29	+26	60	Quarter-finals
2024–25	1. liga	14th	35	8	10	17	34	55	–21	34	Round of 16
2025–26	1. liga	16th	35	5	11	19	23	51	–28	26	Round of 16

== Honours ==
- Czech National Football League
  - Champions: 2010–11, 2023–24

== Club records ==
Competitive matches only. Records are for professional matches only (Czech 2. Liga and higher).

- Record victory: 6–0 v Fulnek, Czech 2. Liga, 13 March 2009; 6–0 v Sparta Prague B, Czech 2. Liga, 25 May 2024
- Record defeat: 0–6 v Jablonec, Czech First League, 3 October 2014
