= 2011–12 FK Dukla Prague season =

Dukla Prague
2011–12 season
- Chairman: Martin Lafek
- Manager: Luboš Kozel
- Stadium: Stadion Juliska
- Gambrinus liga: 6th
- CMFS Cup: Fourth Round
- Top goalscorer: League: Ivan Lietava (11); All: Ivan Lietava (11)
- Highest home attendance: 4,590 v Sparta Prague (9 May 2012)
- Lowest home attendance: League: 1,156 v Jablonec (22 October 2011); Cup: 250 v Jablonec (19 October 2011)
Home colours	Away colours

The 2011-12 season was Dukla Prague's first season in the Gambrinus liga after they were promoted from the Czech 2. Liga during the previous season.

== Preseason ==
Six pre-season friendlies were announced, starting on 2 July 2011. This was just three weeks after Dukla played the final league match of the previous season.

As part of the warm-up programme, Dukla spent time in Nymburk. During the pre-season, Dukla gave trials to a number of players including midfielder Antonín Holub and Spaniard Juan Carlos Carretero Rodríguez.

=== Friendlies ===
2 July 2011	Bohemians 1905	1–0	Dukla Prague	Ďolíček
	19' Nikl	Report		Attendance: 905

9 July 2011	Cottbus	2–2	Dukla Prague	Stadion der Freundschaft
	17' Reimerink; 90' Steffen	Report	Pázler 44'; Marković 88'

12 July 2011	Hradec Králové	1–3	Dukla Prague	Opatovice nad Labem
	Hodas 66'	Report	Svatonský 6'; Marković 17' (pen.); Marič 35'	Attendance: 725

16 July 2011	Dukla Prague	1–0	Jihlava	Nymburk
	Sklenář 68'	Report

20 July 2011	České Budějovice	1–3	Dukla Prague	Votice
	Petráň 14'	Report	Sklenář 23'; Podrazký 36'; Rýdel 78' (o.g.)

22 July 2011	Dukla Prague	5–0	Písek	Stadion Juliska
	Marković 27' 33'; Berger 58' 81'; Pázler 79'	Report

7 October 2011	Leipzig	1–1	Dukla Prague	Freiberg
	Heidinger 50'	Report	Pázler 35'	Attendance: 100

7 January 2012	Vlašim	0–2	Dukla Prague	Beroun
		Report	Marković 19'; Pázler 89'	Referee: Libor Kovařík

11 January 2012	Sokolov	2–1	Dukla Prague	Beroun
	Vaněček 14'; Geňo 57'	Report	Engelmann 85'	Referee: Pavel Franěk

14 January 2012	Dukla Prague	3–0	Sezimovo Ústí	Beroun
	Hanousek 23'; Lietava 43'; Podrazký 85'	Report		Referee: Ochotnický

21 January 2012	Viktoria Plzeň	1–1	Dukla Prague	Beroun
	Čišovský 19'	Report	Engelmann 73'	Referee: Adam

25 January 2012	Sparta Prague	5–2	Dukla Prague	Zličín
	Kweuke 3', 89'; Hušbauer 6'; Vorel 9' (o.g.); Folprecht 84'	Report	Podrazký 48'; Marek 48'

29 January 2012	Chieti	1–1	Dukla Prague	Chieti
	Anastasi 40'	Club	Malý 62'

2 February 2012	Latina	1–4	Dukla Prague	Latina
	Citro 86'	Report; Club	Lietava 21', 60'; Pázler 43', 90'

5 February 2012	Anziolavinio	0–2	Dukla Prague	Anzio
		Club	Marek 56'; Lietava 80'

11 February 2012	Dukla Prague	3–1	Dukla Banská Bystrica	Beroun
	Lietava 8', 47' (pen.); Svatonský 79'	Report	Matúš 46'

== Players ==
=== Squad information ===
As of 6 September 2011.

Note: Flags indicate national team as defined under FIFA eligibility rules; some limited exceptions apply. Players may hold more than one non-FIFA nationality.

No.	Pos.	Nation	Player
1	GK	CZE	Filip Rada
2	DF	CZE	Michal Šmíd
3	DF	CZE	Ondřej Švejdík (on loan from Sparta Prague)
4	DF	CZE	Tomáš Pospíšil
5	MF	CZE	Marek Hanousek
6	DF	CZE	Pavel Hašek
7	FW	CZE	Martin Jirouš (on loan from Sparta Prague)
8	FW	CZE	Jan Pázler
9	DF	CZE	Jan Vorel (captain)
10	MF	CZE	Miroslav Podrazký
11	FW	CZE	Radim Nečas
12	MF	CZE	Matěj Marič

No.	Pos.	Nation	Player
13	MF	CZE	Tomáš Berger
14	MF	CZE	Patrik Gedeon
17	MF	CZE	Vojtěch Přeučil
18	FW	SRB	Miroslav Marković
19	MF	CZE	Ondřej Šiml
21	FW	CZE	Jan Svatonský
22	FW	CZE	Patrik Svoboda
23	DF	CZE	Ondřej Vrzal
24	MF	CZE	Petr Malý
26	DF	CZE	David Mikula
30	GK	SVK	Tomáš Kučera
39	FW	SVK	Ivan Lietava (on loan from Žilina)

=== Transfers ===
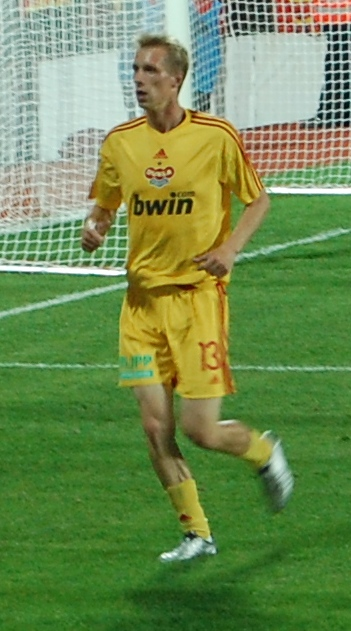
Tomáš Berger impressed in the first half of the season and went out on loan to FC Viktoria Plzeň in the winter break

Dukla lost striker Dani Chigou at the end of June, after his contract with the club ran out. He had been the top scorer of the Czech 2. Liga for the previous two seasons. In a bid to bring in a replacement, Serb Miroslav Marković, who had just finished the season as second-highest goalscorer behind Chigou, was signed on a three-year deal. The only other permanent signing made during the summer, as the club prepared for the top flight, was the two-year deal for midfielder Miroslav Podrazký. Podrazký himself had finished the previous season as the third-highest scorer behind Chigou and Marković.

In September, Dukla's front line was further boosted with the loan signing of Slovak striker Ivan Lietava until the end of the season.

During the winter break Tomáš Berger moved to Plzen on loan before Marek Hanousek signed a permanent deal with the same club. However according to the terms of Hanousek's deal, he could stay at Dukla "on loan" for the rest of the season. Defender Ondřej Švejdík extended his loan from Sparta until the end of the season. Players joining the club during the winter transfer window included forwards Vojtěch Engelmann and Josef Marek from FK Kunice, the latter on loan, and Croatian defender Tomislav Božić.

==== In ====
No.	Pos.	Nat.	Name	Age	EU	Moving from	Type	Transfer window	Ends	Transfer fee	Source
18	MF	(Serbia)	Miroslav Marković	21	Non-EU	Baník Ostrava	Transfer	Summer	2014	Undisclosed	
3	DF	(Czech Republic)	Ondřej Švejdík	28	EU	Sparta Prague	Loan	Summer	2012	Free	
10	MF	(Czech Republic)	Miroslav Podrazký	26	EU	Sokolov	Transfer	Summer	2013	Undisclosed	
39	FW	(Slovakia)	Ivan Lietava	28	EU	Žilina (Slovakia)	Loan	Summer	2012	Free	
16	FW	(Czech Republic)	Vojtěch Engelmann	22	EU	Kunice	Transfer	Winter	2013		
20	FW	(Czech Republic)	Josef Marek	24	EU	Kunice	Loan	Winter	2012		
22	DF	(Croatia)	Tomislav Božić	24	EU	Gorica (Croatia)	Transfer	Winter	2013		

==== Out ====
No.	Pos.	Nat.	Name	Age	EU	Moving to	Type	Transfer window	Transfer fee	Source
18	FW	(Cameroon)	Dani Chigou	27	Non-EU	Volgar-Gazprom Astrakhan (Russia)	Out of contract	Summer	Free	
17	FW	(Czech Republic)	Pavel Vrána	26	EU	Piast Gliwice (Poland)	Out of contract	Summer	Free	
	MF	(Czech Republic)	David Radosta	20	EU	Vlašim	Loan	Summer	Free	
3	DF	(Czech Republic)	Ondřej Kučera	24	EU	Retired	Out of contract	Summer	Free	
29	GK	(Czech Republic)	Jakub Jakubov	22	EU	Mladá Boleslav	Transfer	Summer	Undisclosed	
	DF	(Czech Republic)	Martin Macháček	22	EU	Příbram	Transfer	Summer	Undisclosed	
25	DF	(Slovakia)	Peter Mičic	25	EU	Górnik Polkowice (Poland)	Transfer	Summer	Undisclosed	
10	MF	(Hungary)	Donát Laczkovich	20	EU	Paks (Hungary)	Transfer	Summer	Undisclosed	
25	FW	(Czech Republic)	Jakub Sklenář	20	EU	Sezimovo Ústí	Loan	Summer	Free	
13	FW	(Czech Republic)	Tomáš Berger	26	EU	Viktoria Plzeň	Loan	Winter	Free	
11	FW	(Czech Republic)	Radim Nečas	24	EU	Vlašim	Loan	Winter	Free	
17	MF	(Czech Republic)	Vojtěch Přeučil	21	EU	Sezimovo Ústí	Loan	Winter	Free	

== Management and coaching staff ==
Position	Name
Manager	Luboš Kozel
Coach	Jan Suchopárek
Goalkeeping Coach	Tomáš Obermajer
Fitness Coach	Antonín Čepek
Team Leader	Jiří Blažek
Club Physio	Pavel Hrásky
Masseur	Radek Havala
Custodian	Václav Petrák

Source: fkdukla.cz

== Statistics ==
=== Appearances and goals ===
- Starts + Substitute appearances.

No.	Pos	Nat	Player	Total		League		Cup	
No.	Pos	Nat	Player	Apps	Goals	Apps	Goals	Apps	Goals
1	GK	(Czech Republic) CZE	Filip Rada	29	0	29+0	0	0+0	0
2	DF	(Czech Republic) CZE	Michal Šmíd	3	1	1+1	0	1+0	1
3	DF	(Czech Republic) CZE	Ondřej Švejdík	30	2	25+2	2	3+0	0
4	DF	(Czech Republic) CZE	Tomáš Pospíšil	15	0	9+2	0	4+0	0
5	MF	(Czech Republic) CZE	Marek Hanousek	32	6	29+1	6	1+1	0
6	MF	(Czech Republic) CZE	Pavel Hašek	25	1	21+1	1	3+0	0
7	FW	(Czech Republic) CZE	Martin Jirouš	4	2	0+2	0	2+0	2
8	FW	(Czech Republic) CZE	Jan Pázler	28	6	15+11	6	2+0	0
9	DF	(Czech Republic) CZE	Jan Vorel	26	2	25+1	2	0+0	0
10	MF	(Czech Republic) CZE	Miroslav Podrazký	29	3	14+11	2	3+1	1
11	FW	(Czech Republic) CZE	Radim Nečas	5	0	0+2	0	1+2	0
12	MF	(Czech Republic) CZE	Matěj Marič	2	0	0+1	0	0+1	0
13	MF	(Czech Republic) CZE	Tomáš Berger	17	2	16+0	2	0+1	0
14	MF	(Czech Republic) CZE	Patrik Gedeon	28	1	27+0	1	1+0	0
16	FW	(Czech Republic) CZE	Vojtěch Engelmann	12	0	3+9	0	0+0	0
17	MF	(Czech Republic) CZE	Vojtěch Přeučil	9	0	0+5	0	2+2	0
18	FW	(Serbia) SRB	Miroslav Marković	17	2	11+3	2	2+1	0
19	MF	(Czech Republic) CZE	Ondřej Šiml	10	1	4+2	0	4+0	1
20	FW	(Czech Republic) CZE	Josef Marek	10	0	2+8	0	0+0	0
21	FW	(Czech Republic) CZE	Jan Svatonský	26	5	13+9	3	3+1	2
22	FW	(Czech Republic) CZE	Patrik Svoboda	1	0	0+0	0	1+0	0
22	FW	(Croatia) CRO	Tomislav Božić	10	0	6+4	0	0+0	0
23	MF	(Czech Republic) CZE	Ondřej Vrzal	30	0	26+2	0	2+0	0
24	MF	(Czech Republic) CZE	Petr Malý	30	4	24+5	4	0+1	0
25	FW	(Czech Republic) CZE	Jakub Sklenář	5	0	1+4	0	0+0	0
26	DF	(Czech Republic) CZE	David Mikula	14	1	7+3	0	4+0	1
30	GK	(Slovakia) SVK	Tomáš Kučera	5	0	1+0	0	4+0	0
39	FW	(Slovakia) SVK	Ivan Lietava	23	11	21+0	11	1+1	0

=== Goalscorers ===
Pos	Nat	Player	LIG	CUP	Total
1	(Slovakia)	Ivan Lietava	11	0	11
2	(Czech Republic)	Marek Hanousek	6	0	6
2	(Czech Republic)	Jan Pázler	6	0	6
4	(Czech Republic)	Jan Svatonský	3	2	5
5	(Czech Republic)	Petr Malý	4	0	4
6	(Czech Republic)	Miroslav Podrazký	2	1	3
7	(Czech Republic)	Tomáš Berger	2	0	2
7	(Serbia)	Miroslav Marković	2	0	2
7	(Czech Republic)	Ondřej Švejdík	2	0	2
7	(Czech Republic)	Jan Vorel	2	0	2
7	(Czech Republic)	Martin Jirouš	0	2	2
12	(Czech Republic)	Patrik Gedeon	1	0	1
12	(Czech Republic)	Pavel Hašek	1	0	1
12	(Czech Republic)	David Mikula	0	1	1
12	(Czech Republic)	Ondřej Šiml	0	1	1
12	(Czech Republic)	Michal Šmíd	0	1	1
		Totals	42	8	50

=== Disciplinary record ===
As of 9 May 2012

Number	Nation	Position	Name	League		Cup		Total	
Number	Nation	Position	Name	Yellow card	Red card	Yellow card	Red card	Yellow card	Red card
14	(Czech Republic)	DF	Patrik Gedeon	7	0	0	0	7	0
39	(Slovakia)	FW	Ivan Lietava	7	0	0	0	7	0
23	(Czech Republic)	DF	Ondřej Vrzal	6	0	0	0	6	0
24	(Czech Republic)	MF	Petr Malý	4	0	0	0	4	0
26	(Czech Republic)	DF	David Mikula	3	0	0	0	3	0
9	(Czech Republic)	DF	Jan Vorel	3	0	0	0	3	0
3	(Czech Republic)	DF	Ondřej Švejdík	3	0	0	0	3	0
5	(Czech Republic)	MF	Marek Hanousek	3	0	0	0	3	0
21	(Czech Republic)	FW	Jan Svatonský	3	0	0	0	3	0
1	(Czech Republic)	GK	Filip Rada	3	0	0	0	3	0
18	(Serbia)	FW	Miroslav Marković	2	0	0	0	2	0
25	(Czech Republic)	FW	Jakub Sklenář	2	0	0	0	2	0
13	(Czech Republic)	MF	Tomáš Berger	1	0	0	0	1	0
17	(Czech Republic)	MF	Vojtěch Přeučil	1	0	0	0	1	0
10	(Czech Republic)	MF	Miroslav Podrazký	1	0	0	0	1	0
19	(Czech Republic)	MF	Ondřej Šiml	1	0	0	0	1	0
16	(Czech Republic)	FW	Vojtěch Engelmann	1	0	0	0	1	0
16	(Czech Republic)	FW	Jan Pázler	1	0	0	0	1	0
			TOTALS	52	0	0	0	52	0

=== Home attendance ===
Competition	Average Attendance	Games
Gambrinus liga	2,434	15
Cup	250	1
Average	2,298	16

== Gambrinus liga ==
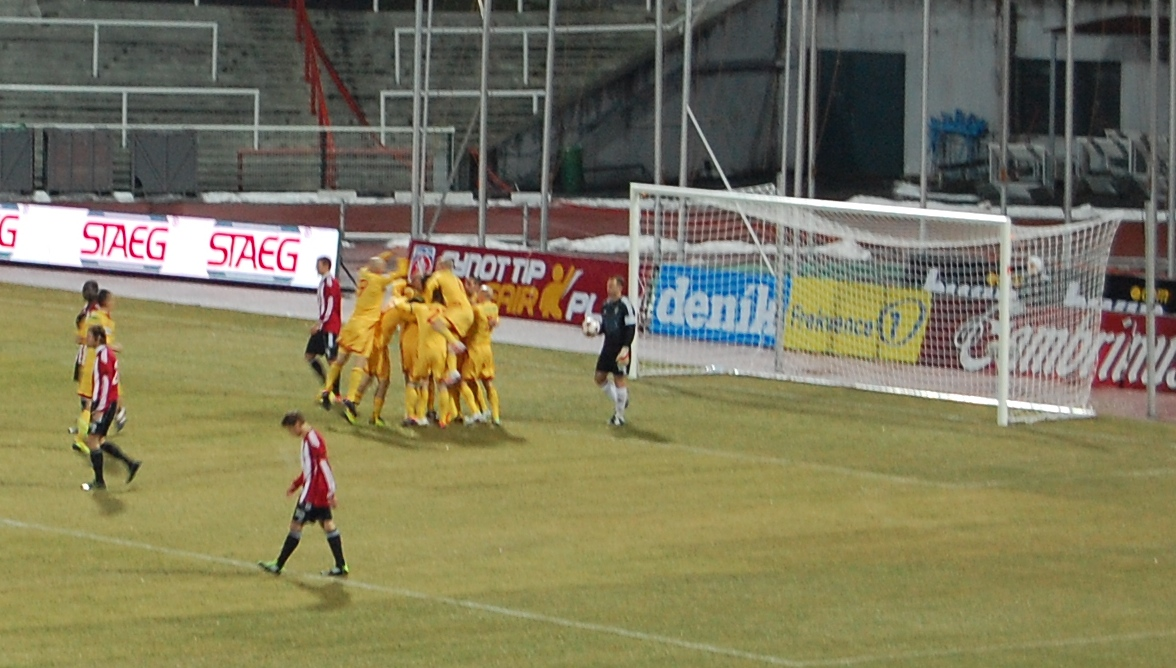
Dukla players celebrate the first goal of 2012, a third-minute strike by Jan Pázler at Juliska

=== Results by round ===
Round	1	2	3	4	5	6	7	8	9	10	11	12	13	14	15	16	17	18	19	20	21	22	23	24	25	26	27	28	29	30
Ground	H	H	A	H	A	H	A	H	A	A	H	A	A	H	A	A	H	A	H	A	H	A	H	H	A	H	H	A	H	A
Result	D	W	L	L	L	W	D	W	W	D	L	W	L	D	D	L	W	D	W	W	D	D	L	W	W	W	L	L	D	L
Position	8	6	10	10	12	10	11	10	7	7	8	7	8	8	8	9	8	8	8	6	6	7	8	8	6	5	5	6	6	6

Updated to match(es) played on 12 May 2012. Source: FKDukla.cz
A = Away; H = Home; W = Win; D = Draw; L = Loss

=== Results summary ===
Overall								Home						Away					
Pld	W	D	L	GF	GA	GD	Pts	W	D	L	GF	GA	GD	W	D	L	GF	GA	GD
30	11	9	10	42	35	+7	42	7	4	4	27	16	+11	4	5	6	15	19	−4

Last updated: 12 May 2012.
Source: Gambrinus liga

=== League table ===
Pos	Team	Pld	W	D	L	GF	GA	GD	Pts	Qualification or relegation
4	Mladá Boleslav	30	15	5	10	49	34	+15	50	Qualification for Europa League second qualifying round (Note: Sigma Olomouc, the 2011–12 Czech Cup winner, were initially to enter the third qualifying round of the Europa League. However, UEFA banned them from participating in Europa League over the club’s involvement in a corruption scandal. As a result, Sparta Prague, the second-placed team of the league, entered the Europa League third qualifying round instead of the second qualifying round, and Mladá Boleslav, the fourth-placed team of the league, will take one of Czech Republic's Europa League places in the second qualifying round.)
5	Teplice	30	12	10	8	36	30	+6	46	
6	Dukla Prague	30	11	9	10	42	35	+7	42	
7	Slovácko	30	12	5	13	29	32	−3	41	
8	Jablonec	30	11	7	12	54	43	+11	40	

Source: Fortuna liga
Rules for classification: 1) points; 2) goal difference; 3) number of goals scored.

=== Matches ===
==== July ====
29 July 2011 Round 1	Dukla Prague	0–0	Olomouc	Prague
		Report		Stadium: Stadion Juliska; Attendance: 3,857; Referee: Pavel Franěk

==== August ====
5 August 2011 Round 2	Dukla Prague	4–2	České Budějovice	Prague
	Svatonský 23'; Gedeon (yellow card) 44'; Pázler 61'; Berger 77'; Mikula (yellow card) 79'; Marković 84'	Report	4' Ondrášek; 79' (pen.) Otepka; (yellow card) 90' Rýdel	Stadium: Stadion Juliska; Attendance: 2,123; Referee: Jaroslav Bílek

12 August 2011 Round 3	Viktoria Žižkov	1–0	Dukla Prague	Prague
	Nestorovski 36' (yellow card) 71'; Bartl (yellow card) 75'	Report	(yellow card) 51' Berger; (yellow card) 68' Vrzal; (yellow card) 73' Mikula	Stadium: FK Viktoria Stadion; Attendance: 4,081; Referee: Karel Hrubeš

20 August 2011 Round 4	Dukla Prague	2–4	Viktoria Plzeň	Prague
	Gedeon (yellow card) 12'; Hanousek 57' 88'; Marković (yellow card) 83'	Report	23' (yellow card) 58' Jiráček; (yellow card) 40' Kolář; 44' 80' Pilař; 72' Ďuriš	Stadium: Stadion Juliska; Attendance: 2,857; Referee: Radek Matějek

27 August 2011 Round 5	Slovácko	1–0	Dukla Prague	Uherské Hradiště
	Kerbr 67'; Trousil (yellow card) 90'	Report	(yellow card) 5' Hanousek; (yellow card) 40' Rada; (yellow card) 90' Švejdík	Stadium: Městský stadion Attendance: 4,576; Referee: Jiří Jech

==== September ====
9 September 2011 Round 6	Dukla Prague	4–0	Hradec Králové	Prague
	Mikula (yellow card) 9'; Berger 29'; Lietava 51' (yellow card) 78'; Marković 64' (pen.) (yellow card) 68'; Malý 89' (pen.)	Report	(yellow card) 51' Fukal; (red card) 63' Plašil; (yellow card) 88' Chleboun	Stadium: Stadion Juliska; Attendance: 1,875; Referee: Jiří Adam

16 September 2011 Round 7	Slavia Prague	0–0	Dukla Prague	Prague
	Hloušek (yellow card) 30'; Blažek (yellow card) 38'; Frejlach (yellow card) 68'	Report	(yellow card) 63' Vrzal; (yellow card) 73' Gedeon	Stadium: Synot Tip Arena; Attendance: 6,671; Referee: Michal Paták

23 September 2011 Round 8	Dukla Prague	2–1	Příbram	Prague
	Vorel 16' (yellow card) 83'; Hanousek 48'; Lietava (yellow card) 75'	Report	(red card) 27' Ricka; 39' Wágner; (yellow card) 73' Valenta	Stadium: Stadion Juliska; Attendance: 1,858; Referee: Pavel Královec

==== October ====
1 October 2011 Round 9	Liberec	1–2	Dukla Prague	Liberec
	Rilke 12'	Report	(yellow card) 43' Svatonský; 62' Gedeon; (yellow card) 73' Vrzal; (yellow card) 82' Rada; 83' Lietava	Stadium: Stadion u Nisy; Attendance: 5,320; Referee: Petr Ardeleánu

16 October 2011 Round 10	Bohemians 1905	0–0	Dukla Prague	Prague
	Bartek (yellow card) 60'; Jindřišek (yellow card) 69'	Report	(yellow card) 62' Vorel; (yellow card) 62' Gedeon	Stadium: Synot Tip Arena; Attendance: 3,101; Referee: Radek Matějek

22 October 2011 Round 11	Dukla Prague	1–3	Jablonec	Prague
	Hanousek 23'; Lietava (yellow card) 51'; Přeučil (yellow card) 61'	Report	(yellow card) 25' Jarolím; 54' Beneš; (yellow card) 67' Eliáš; 73' Zábojník; 76' Piták; (yellow card) 81' Kovařík	Stadium: Stadion Evžena Rošického; Attendance: 1,156; Referee: Tomáš Kocourek

29 October 2011 Round 12	Baník Ostrava	1–2	Dukla Prague	Ostrava
	Vomáčka 7' (yellow card) 90'	Report	3' Lietava; 79' Hanousek	Stadium: Bazaly; Attendance: 3,582; Referee: Jiří Adam

==== November ====
6 November 2011 Round 13	Mladá Boleslav	3–1	Dukla Prague	Mladá Boleslav
	Chramosta 45'; Rolko 56'; Šćuk (yellow card) 62'; Kulič 87'	Report	18' Lietava; (yellow card) 45' Gedeon	Stadium: Městský stadion Attendance: 4,047; Referee: Roman Hrubeš

19 November 2011 Round 14	Dukla Prague	0–0	Teplice	Prague
		Report		Stadium: Stadion Evžena Rošického; Attendance: 1,432; Referee: Petr Mikel

25 November 2011 Round 15	Sparta Prague	0–0	Dukla Prague	Prague
	Hušbauer (yellow card) 29'	Report	(yellow card) 50' Vorel	Stadium: Generali Arena; Attendance: 7,454; Referee: Tomáš Adámek

==== December ====
4 December 2011 Round 16	České Budějovice	3–2	Dukla Prague	České Budějovice
	Rýdel 6'; Otepka (yellow card) 19'; Klesa 30'; Sandro 50'; Javorek (yellow card) 73'	Report	(yellow card) 17' Malý; (yellow card) 32' Hanousek; 55', 59' Lietava; (yellow card) 80' Vrzal	Stadium: Stadion Střelecký ostrov Attendance: 2,343; Referee: Radek Příhoda

==== February ====
17 February 2012 Round 17	Dukla Prague	3–0	Viktoria Žižkov	Prague
	Pázler 3'; Podrazký 13'; Malý 17'; Lietava (yellow card) 25'	Report	(yellow card) 13' Bartl; (yellow card) 31' Valenta	Stadium: Stadion Juliska; Attendance: 1,254; Referee: Roman Hrubeš

25 February 2012 Round 18	Viktoria Plzeň	1–1	Dukla Prague	Plzeň
	Horváth 30' (pen.); Ševínský (yellow card) 35'; Ďuriš (yellow card) 64'	Report	(yellow card) 25' Podrazký; (yellow card) 30' (yellow-red card) 63' Sklenář; (yellow card) 51' Švejdík; 52' Malý; (yellow card) 74' Gedeon	Stadium: Stadion města Plzně; Attendance: 6,441; Referee: Tomáš Kocourek

==== March ====
2 March 2012 Round 19	Dukla Prague	2–0	Slovácko	Prague
	Hanousek 45'; Pázler 62'; Malý (yellow card) 82'	Report	(yellow card) 71' Hlúpik; (yellow card) 82' Volešák; (yellow card) 89' Kubáň	Stadium: Stadion Juliska; Attendance: 1,870; Referee: Pavel Franěk

11 March 2012 Round 20	Hradec Králové	0–2	Dukla Prague	Hradec Králové
	Černý (yellow card) 44'; Plašil (yellow card) 67'; Poděbradský (yellow card) 76'	Report	(yellow card) 36' (goal) 62' Švejdík; 64' Malý	Stadium: Všesportovní stadion Attendance: 3,799; Referee: Martin Nenadál

19 March 2012 Round 21	Dukla Prague	0–0	Slavia Prague	Prague
	Engelmann (yellow card) 86'	Report	(yellow card) 55' Dostál	Stadium: Stadion Juliska; Attendance: 4,258; Referee: J. Váňa

23 March 2012 Round 22	Příbram	2–2	Dukla Prague	Příbram
	Koukal 9' (pen.); Šlapák 42'; Andrejević (yellow card) 85'	Report	10' Lietava; (yellow card) 66' Vrzal; 90' Švejdík	Stadium: Na Litavce; Attendance: 1,868; Referee: Roman Hrubeš

==== April ====
1 April 2012 Round 23	Dukla Prague	1–2	Liberec	Prague
	Pázler (yellow card) 58'; Podrazký 84'	Report	5' (yellow card) 70' Rilke; (yellow card) 65' Fleišman; 75' Štajner	Stadium: Stadion Juliska; Attendance: 1,683; Referee: Jiří Jech

6 April 2012 Round 24	Dukla Prague	2–0	Bohemians 1905	Prague
	Lietava 40'; Hašek 58'	Report	(yellow card) 70' Abraham	Stadium: Stadion Juliska; Attendance: 2,857; Referee: Petr Ardeleánu

15 April 2012 Round 25	Jablonec	0–2	Dukla Prague	Jablonec nad Nisou
	Piták (yellow card) 55'; Eliáš (yellow card) 77' (yellow-red card) 90'; Vošahlík (yellow card) 79'	Report	6', 68' Pázler; (yellow card) 53' Hanousek; (yellow card) 82' Malý	Stadium: Chance Arena; Attendance: 2,085; Referee: M. Zelinka

20 April 2012 Round 26	Dukla Prague	4–1	Baník Ostrava	Prague
	Lietava (yellow card) 5' (goal) 59'; Vorel 14'; Pázler 28'; Svatonský 59' (yellow card) 61'	Report	(yellow card) 26' Frydrych; 88' Zawada	Stadium: Stadion Juliska; Attendance: 2,497; Referee: Jan Jílek

29 April 2012 Round 27	Dukla Prague	1–2	Mladá Boleslav	Prague
	Gedeon (yellow card) 34'; Lietava (yellow card) 36' (goal) 87'; Malý (yellow card) 75'	Report	11' (yellow card) 54' Chramosta; 34' (pen.) Mareš; (yellow card) 41' Šírl; (yellow card) 78' Fillo; (yellow card) 83' Bulut; (yellow card) 90' Šeda	Stadium: Stadion Juliska; Attendance: 2,347; Referee: Michal Paták

==== May ====
6 May 2012 Round 28	Teplice	4–0	Dukla Prague	Teplice
	Ljevaković 9', 30'; Vachoušek 36'; Vůch 63'; Siva (yellow card) 76'	Report	(yellow card) 43' Šiml; (yellow card) 56' Svatonský; (yellow card) 65' Vrzal	Stadium: Na Stínadlech; Attendance: 2,980; Referee: Radek Matějek

9 May 2012 Round 29	Dukla Prague	1–1	Sparta Prague	Prague
	Lietava (yellow card) 42' (goal) 63'; Rada (yellow card) 90'	Report	(yellow card) 39' (goal) 54' Hušbauer; (yellow card) 55' Kerić; (yellow card) 89' Přikryl	Stadium: Stadion Juliska; Attendance: 4,590; Referee: Pavel Královec

12 May 2012 Round 30	Olomouc	2–1	Dukla Prague	Olomouc
17:30	Varadi 2' (yellow card) 29'; Schulmeister 56'; Nepožitek (yellow card) 85'	Report	Svatonský 10' (yellow card) 45'; Vorel (yellow card) 38'	Stadium: Andrův stadion Attendance: 4,153; Referee: Libor Kovarik

== Cup ==
As a Gambrinus liga team, Dukla entered the Cup at the second round stage. In the second round, it took until second half injury time in the away game at Sokol Brozany for Dukla to get on the scoresheet, courtesy of a Martin Jirouš strike, and thus avoid a potentially embarrassing penalty shootout. The third round match at Sokol Tasovice was more comfortably won, with two goals in each half securing progress. In the fourth round, up against Gambrinus liga competition for the first time in the form of Jablonec, Dukla lost by a single goal in the away game before winning 3-2 in the return leg at Juliska. The club therefore went out on the away goals rule. This was the second consecutive season that Dukla had been knocked out of the cup by Jablonec, having lost in the third round in the previous season.

16 August 2011 Second Round	Sokol Brozany	0–1	Dukla Prague	Brozany nad Ohří
		Report	90+1' Jirouš	Stadium: Sokol Brozany; Referee: Roman Hrubeš

31 August 2011 Third Round	Sokol Tasovice	0–4	Dukla Prague	Tasovice
		Report	17' Jirouš; 18' Podrazký; 50' Svatonský; 69' Mikula	Stadium: Stadion Tasanda; Attendance: 1,180; Referee: Jan Jílek

28 September 2011 Fourth Round, 1st Leg	FK Baumit Jablonec	1–0	Dukla Prague	Jablonec nad Nisou
	Lafata 38' (pen.)	Report		Stadium: Chance Arena; Attendance: 2,065; Referee: Pavel Franěk

19 October 2011 Fourth Round, 2nd Leg	Dukla Prague	3–2 (3–3 agg.)	FK Baumit Jablonec	Prague
	Šiml 36'; Šmíd 63'; Svatonský 79'	Report	7' Zábojník; 19' Piták	Stadium: Stadion Juliska; Attendance: 250; Referee: Pavel Býma
