= Vanderlei =

Vanderlei is a given name popular in Brazil as well as a surname. The given name derives from the surname, which derives from the Dutch van der Lee. The Brazilian family name Vanderlei and Wanderley, now also used as given names, was introduced in Brazil in 1637 by the Dutch cavalry captain Gaspar/Caspar van Niehof van der Leij, who may have been born in Gummersbach. Notable people with the name include:

== Given name ==
- Vanderlei José Alves or simply Vanderlei (born 1978), Brazilian football striker
- Rubens Vanderlei Tavares Cardoso (born 1976), Brazilian retired left wingback, current assistant manager of Brasil de Pelotas
- Vanderlei Francisco, Brazilian footballer
- Vanderlei de Lima (born 1969), former long-distance runner who specialised in marathons
- Vanderlei Luxemburgo (born 1952), Brazilian football manager and former player
- Jean Raphael Vanderlei Moreira (born 1986), simply known as Jean, is a Brazilian footballer
- Palhinha (Vanderlei Eustaquio de Oliveira) (1950–2023), Brazilian footballer
- Vanderlei Alves de Oliveira (born 1959), former Brazilian football (soccer) player
- Vanderlei Bernardo Oliveira, centre forward and attacking midfielder
- Vanderlei Lázaro (born 1947), former Brazilian left back
- Vanderlei Silva de Oliveira (born 1977), former Brazilian football player
- Vanderlei Paiva (1946–2023), Brazilian professional football coach and former player
- Vanderlei Mascarenhas dos Santos (born 1982), Brazilian footballer
- Vanderlei Farias da Silva (born 1984), Brazilian footballer
- Vanderlei Fernandes Silva (born 1975), Brazilian former footballer
- Vanderlei Ramildo Augusto da Silva (born 1943), former Brazilian goalkeeper
- Rizoneide Vanderlei (born 1966), former Brazilian long-distance runner

== Surname ==
- João Maurício Vanderlei, Baron of Cotegipe (1815–1889), magistrate and Brazilian politician of the Conservative Party
- Nélson Freire Lavanère-Wanderley, Brazilian Minister of Aeronautics

== See also ==
- Wanderlei, a spelling variant of the name
- Wanderley, a spelling variant of the name
