= Van der Lee =

Van der Lee is a Dutch toponymic surname meaning "from the Lee". De Lee / Lede / Lei was a common name for a canal, derived from the verb leiden ("to lead") and the city of Leiden ultimately derives its name from such a canal as well. Families with this name have perhaps six different places of origin in the Netherlands. Variants include Van der Lei(j), Van der Leede and Van der Lede(n). The Brazilian family name Vanderlei and Wanderley, now also used as given names, was introduced in Brazil in 1637 by the Dutch cavalry captain Gaspar/Caspar van Niehof van der Leij, who may have been born in Gummersbach. People with these names include:

Van der Lee

- Monique van der Lee (born 1973), Dutch judoka
- Suzan van der Lee, Dutch seismologist
- Tom van der Lee (born 1964), Dutch politician

Van Lee

- Chantal Vanlee (born 1965), Belgian singer known as "Dana Winner"
- Susanna van Lee (ca.1630– 1700), Dutch stage actor and ballet dancer

Van der Lei(j)

- Joop van der Leij (1898–1991), Dutch javelin thrower
- Stefan van der Lei (born 1993), Dutch football goalkeeper

Van der Lede(n)

- Gijs van der Leden (born 1967), Dutch water polo player

Vanderlei

- João Maurício Vanderlei (1815–1889), Prime Minister of Brazil
- Rizoneide Vanderlei (born 1966), Brazilian long-distance runner

== See also ==
- G. van der Lee Rope Factory, Dutch family business from 1545 to 2013
- Vander Lee (1966–2016), Brazilian singer-songwriter born "Vanderli Catarina"
