= Kmetiněves =

- Municipality
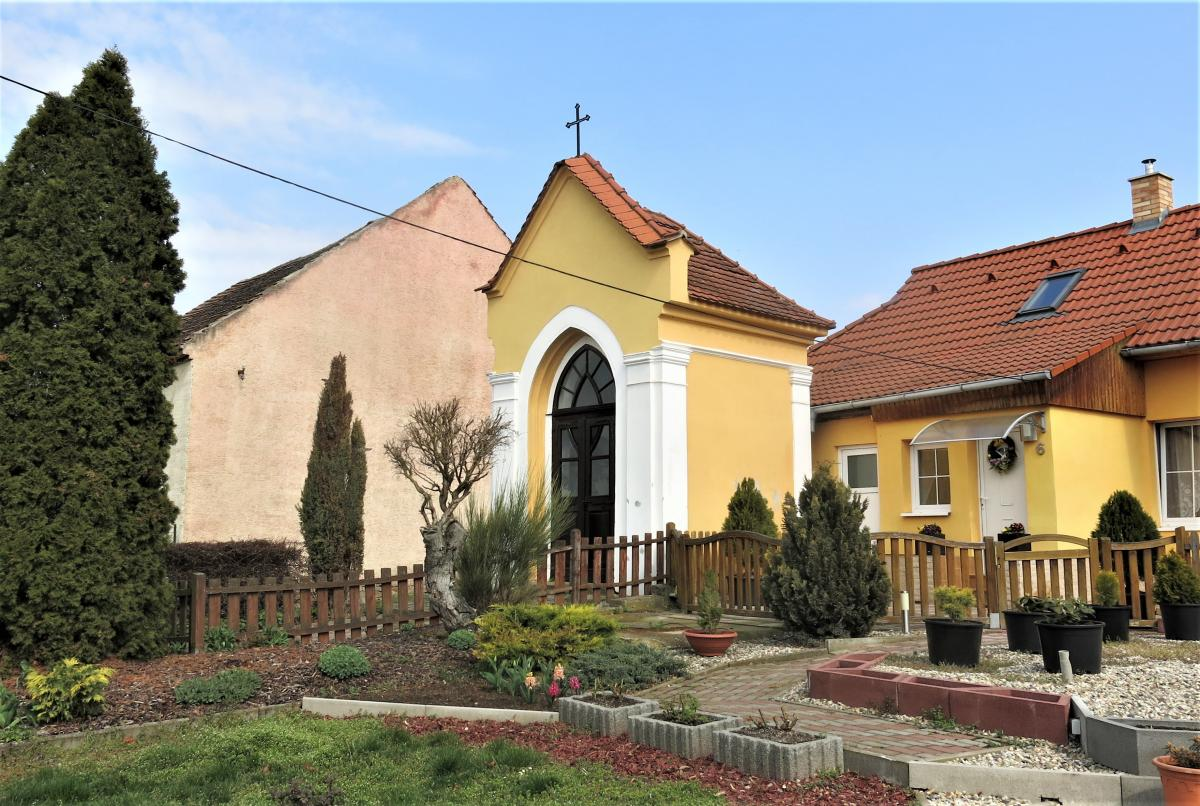
- Chapel of the Holy Trinity

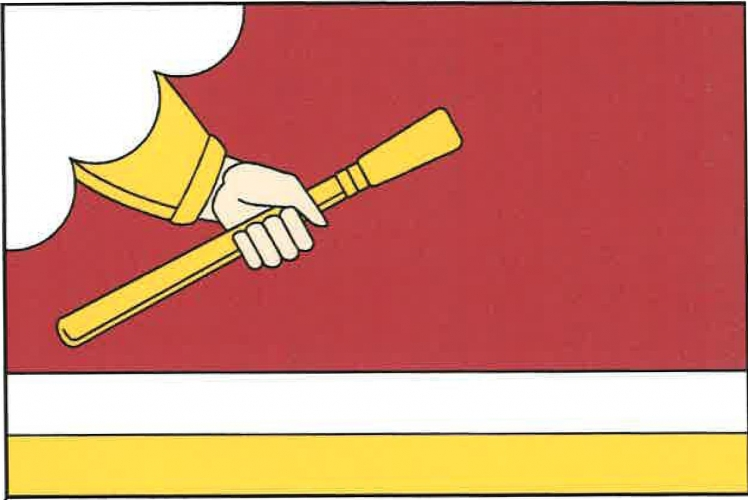
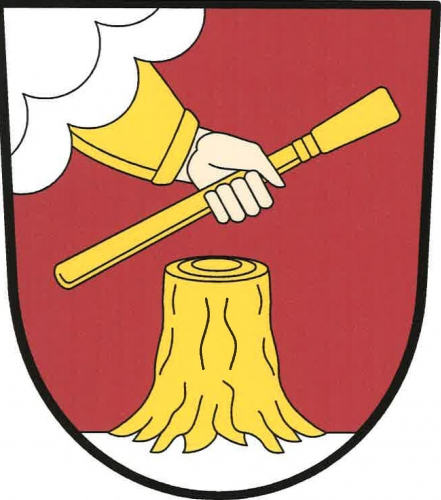
- Flag Coat of arms

- Location in the Czech Republic
- Coordinates: 50°18′33″N 14°9′22″E
- Country: Czech Republic
- Region: Central Bohemian
- District: Kladno
- First mentioned: 1336

Area
  - Total: 6.83 km^{2} (2.64 sq mi)
- Elevation: 199 m (653 ft)

Population (2026-01-01)
  - Total: 304
  - Density: 44.5/km^{2} (115/sq mi)
- Time zone: UTC+1 (CET)
  - Summer (DST): UTC+2 (CEST)
- Postal code: 273 22
- Website: www.kmetineves.cz

Kmetiněves is a municipality and village in Kladno District in the Central Bohemian Region of the Czech Republic. It has about 300 inhabitants.

== Etymology ==
The name is derived from the Czech phrase Kmetina ves, meaning 'Kmet's village'.

== Geography ==
Kmetiněves is located about 18 kilometres (11 mi) north of Kladno and 29 km (18 mi) northwest of Prague. It lies in a flat agricultural landscape in the Lower Ohře Table. The highest point is at 257 m (843 ft) above sea level. The stream Vranský potok flows through the municipality.

== History ==
The first written mention of Kmetiněves is from 1336, when King John of Bohemia donated the village to the monastery in Doksany.

== Demographics ==
Historical population

Year	Pop.	±%
1869	448	—
1880	559	+24.8%
1890	589	+5.4%
1900	556	−5.6%
1910	514	−7.6%

Year	Pop.	±%
1921	483	−6.0%
1930	516	+6.8%
1950	311	−39.7%
1961	335	+7.7%
1970	307	−8.4%

Year	Pop.	±%
1980	304	−1.0%
1991	266	−12.5%
2001	294	+10.5%
2011	294	+0.0%
2021	280	−4.8%

Source: Censuses

== Transport ==
There are no major roads passing through the municipality. The railway that runs through Kmetiněves is unused.

== Sights ==
The main landmark of Kmetiněves is the Church of Saint Wenceslaus. It was first mentioned in 1352. The church was rebuilt in the Baroque style in 1730, but the Gothic tower has been preserved.
