= Vanderlei Silva =

Vanderlei Silva may refer to:

- Wanderlei Silva, Brazilian mixed martial arts fighter
- Vanderlei Fernandes Silva, also known as Derlei, Brazilian football player
- Vanderlei Silva de Oliveira, Brazilian football player
