= Tomáš Pospíšil =

Tomáš Pospíšil may refer to:

- Tomáš Pospíšil (footballer) (born 1991), Czech professional association football player
- Tomáš Pospíšil (ice hockey) (born 1987), Czech professional ice hockey player
