= Plašil =

Plašil (feminine: Plašilová) is a Czech surname. Notable people with the surname include:

- Jaroslav Plašil (born 1982), Czech footballer
- Marek Plašil (born 1985), Czech footballer
