= 2008–09 Czech 2. Liga =

2. česká fotbalová liga
- Season: 2008–09
- Champions: Bohemians 1905
- Promoted: Bohemians 1905; Slovácko
- Relegated: HFK Olomouc; Fulnek
- Matches played: 240
- Goals scored: 578 (2.41 per match)
- Top goalscorer: Martin Jirouš (18)
- Average attendance: 1,689

The 2008–09 Czech 2. Liga was the 16th season of the 2. česká fotbalová liga, the second tier of the Czech football league. Bohemians 1905 were promoted to the Czech First League as winners of the league. Second placed Čáslav decided not to promote and sold their license to Slovácko, who were promoted in their place.

== Team changes ==
=== From 2. Liga ===
Promoted to Czech First League

- FK Bohemians Praha (Střížkov)
- FK Marila Příbram

Relegated to Moravian-Silesian Football League

- FC Hlučín

Relegated to Bohemian Football League

- SK Sparta Krč

=== To 2. Liga ===
Relegated from Czech First League

- Bohemians 1905
- FK SIAD Most

Promoted from Bohemian Football League

- Sparta Prague B

Promoted from Moravian-Silesian Football League

- MFK Karviná

== League table ==
| Pos | Team | Pld | W | D | L | GF | GA | GD | Pts | Promotion or relegation |
|---|---|---|---|---|---|---|---|---|---|---|
| 1 | Bohemians 1905 (C, P) | 30 | 18 | 9 | 3 | 36 | 14 | +22 | 63 | Promotion to 2009–10 1. Liga |
| 2 | Čáslav | 30 | 16 | 8 | 6 | 42 | 27 | +15 | 56 | |
| 3 | Jihlava | 30 | 15 | 6 | 9 | 36 | 27 | +9 | 51 | |
| 4 | Ústí nad Labem | 30 | 15 | 4 | 11 | 39 | 38 | +1 | 49 | |
| 5 | Dukla Prague | 30 | 12 | 10 | 8 | 37 | 25 | +12 | 46 | |
| 6 | Sokolov | 30 | 12 | 7 | 11 | 56 | 37 | +19 | 43 (Note: SOK: 7 pts > GD 10-7; OPA: 7 pts > GD 6-5; KAR: 2 pts) | |
| 7 | Opava | 30 | 12 | 7 | 11 | 44 | 38 | +6 | 43 | |
| 8 | Karviná | 30 | 12 | 7 | 11 | 45 | 42 | +3 | 43 | |
| 9 | Třinec | 30 | 9 | 12 | 9 | 31 | 29 | +2 | 39 (Note: TRI 3–0 SLO; SLO 0–0 TRI) | |
| 10 | Slovácko (Note: Čáslav sold their license for the Czech First League to Slovácko.) (P) | 30 | 9 | 12 | 9 | 25 | 29 | −4 | 39 | Promotion to 2009–10 1. Liga |
| 11 | Sparta Prague B | 30 | 10 | 8 | 12 | 39 | 38 | +1 | 38 | |
| 12 | Most | 30 | 10 | 7 | 13 | 30 | 43 | −13 | 37 | |
| 13 | Hradec Králové | 30 | 7 | 14 | 9 | 36 | 32 | +4 | 35 | |
| 14 | Vítkovice | 30 | 8 | 9 | 13 | 34 | 47 | −13 | 33 | |
| 15 | HFK Olomouc (R) | 30 | 5 | 12 | 13 | 32 | 42 | −10 | 27 | Relegation to 2009–10 MSFL |
| 16 | Fulnek (R) | 30 | 1 | 6 | 23 | 16 | 70 | −54 | 9 | Relegation to 2009–10 MSFL |

Source: The Football Association of the Czech Republic
Rules for classification: 1) points; 2) head-to-head points; 3) head-to-head goal difference; 4) head-to-head goals scored; 5) goal difference; 6) number of goals scored.
(C) Champions; (P) Promoted; (R) Relegated

== Top goalscorers ==
| Rank | Scorer | Club | Goals |
|---|---|---|---|
| 1 | (Czech Republic) Martin Jirouš | Sokolov | 18 |
| 2 | (Czech Republic) Petr Faldyna | Jihlava | 13 |
| 3 | (Czech Republic) Martin Opic | Karviná | 12 |
| 4 | (Czech Republic) David Korčián | HFK Olomouc | 11 |
| 4 | (Czech Republic) Luděk Zelenka | Dukla Prague | 11 |
| 6 | (Czech Republic) Jaroslav Diviš | Vítkovice | 10 |
| 6 | (Czech Republic) Milan Halaška | Opava | 10 |
| 8 | (Czech Republic) Michal Dian | Čáslav | 9 |
| 8 | (Czech Republic) Pavel Dvořák | Hradec Králové | 9 |
| 8 | (Czech Republic) Miloslav Strnad | Čáslav | 9 |

== See also ==
- 2008–09 Czech First League
- 2008–09 Czech Cup
