= Wanderley =

Wanderley is a Brazilian surname. The Brazilian family names Vanderlei and Wanderley, now also used as given names, were introduced in Brazil in 1637 by the Dutch cavalry captain Gaspar/Caspar van Niehof van der Leij, who may have been born in Gummersbach.

Notable people and characters with the name include:

== Surname ==
- Claudio Wanderley Sarmento Neto (born 1982), Brazilian footballer
- Deraldo Wanderley (born 1956), Brazilian volleyball player
- Erik Wanderley, Brazilian jiujitsu fighter
- João Mauricio Wanderley (1815–1889), Brazilian magistrate and politician
- Júlia Wanderley (1874–1918), a pioneer in Paraná education, the first woman appointed as a teacher by the state government
- Leandro Silva Wanderley (born 1979), Brazilian footballer
- Walter Wanderley (1932–1986), Brazilian organist and pianist

== Given name ==
- Wanderley (footballer, born 1938) (1938–2020), full name Wanderley Machado da Silva, Brazilian football forward
- Wanderley Alves dos Reis (1945–2012), Brazilian singer-songwriter better known as Wando
- Wanderley Paiva (born 1946), Brazilian football coach
- Wanderley Alves de Oliveira (born 1959), Brazilian footballer
- Wanderley Oliveira (born 1965), Brazilian boxer
- Wanderley Magalhães Azevedo (1966–2006), Brazilian cyclist
- Wanderley de Jesus Sousa (born 1986), Brazilian footballer better known as Derley
- Wanderley (footballer, born 1988), full name Wanderley Santos Monteiro Júnior, Brazilian football forward

== Fictional characters ==
- Travis Wanderley, a character in American Horror Story: Murder House

== See also ==
- Vanderlei, a spelling variant of the name
- Wanderlei, a spelling variant of the name
- Wanderley, Bahia
