= Kunice (Prague-East District) =

- Municipality
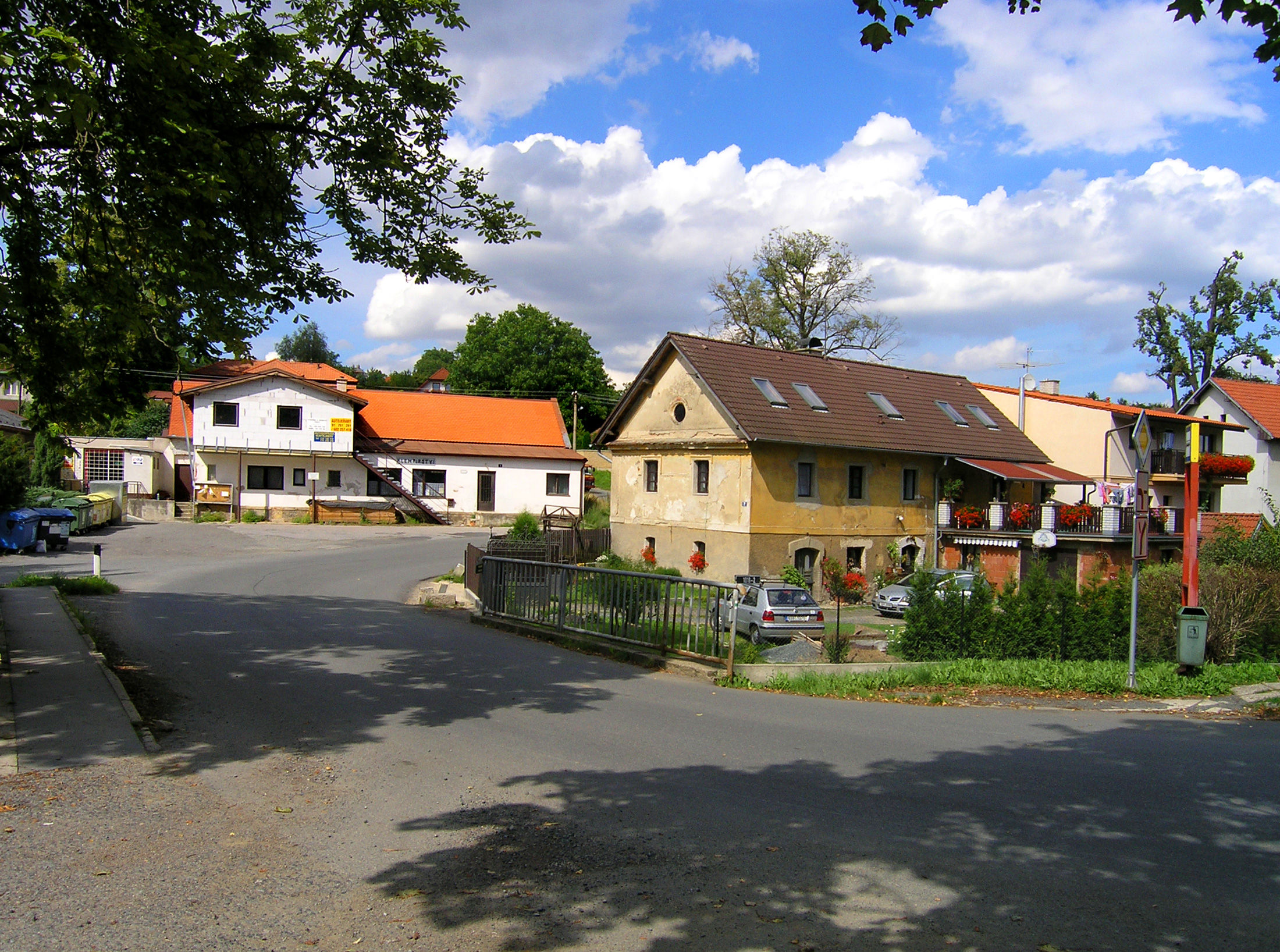
- Centre of Kunice

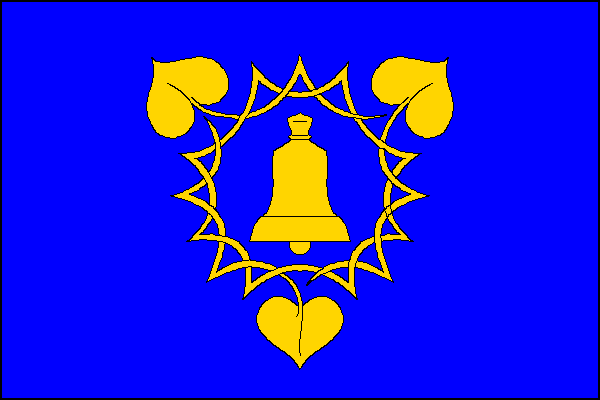
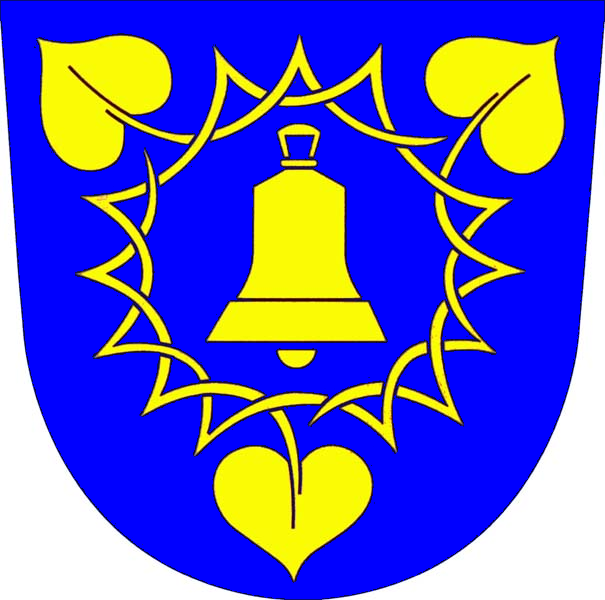
- Flag Coat of arms

- Location in the Czech Republic
- Coordinates: 49°56′12″N 14°40′18″E
- Country: Czech Republic
- Region: Central Bohemian
- District: Prague-East
- First mentioned: 970

Area
  - Total: 10.41 km^{2} (4.02 sq mi)
- Elevation: 419 m (1,375 ft)

Population (2026-01-01)
  - Total: 1,946
  - Density: 186.9/km^{2} (484.2/sq mi)
- Time zone: UTC+1 (CET)
  - Summer (DST): UTC+2 (CEST)
- Postal code: 251 63
- Website: www.kunice.cz

Kunice is a municipality and village in Prague-East District in the Central Bohemian Region of the Czech Republic. It has about 1,900 inhabitants.

== Administrative division ==
Kunice consists of five municipal parts (in brackets population according to the 2021 census):

- Kunice (901)
- Dolní Lomnice (126)
- Horní Lomnice (55)
- Vidovice (661)
- Všešímy (85)

== Etymology ==
The name is derived from the personal name Kuna, meaning "the village of Kuna's people". Kuna was a shortened form of the name Kunrát (Czech form of Conrad).

== Geography ==
Kunice is located about 15 kilometres (9 mi) southeast of Prague. It lies in the Benešov Uplands. The highest point is at 472 m (1,549 ft) above sea level.

== History ==
The first written mention of Kunice is from 970, when the local church was founded.

== Demographics ==
Historical population

Year	Pop.	±%
1869	865	—
1880	815	−5.8%
1890	780	−4.3%
1900	773	−0.9%
1910	719	−7.0%

Year	Pop.	±%
1921	757	+5.3%
1930	896	+18.4%
1950	819	−8.6%
1961	802	−2.1%
1970	692	−13.7%

Year	Pop.	±%
1980	628	−9.2%
1991	522	−16.9%
2001	570	+9.2%
2011	1,209	+112.1%
2021	1,828	+51.2%

Source: Censuses

== Transport ==
The D1 motorway from Prague to Brno runs through the municipality.

== Sport ==
The municipality is home to FK Kunice, which plays in lower amateur tiers.

== Sights ==
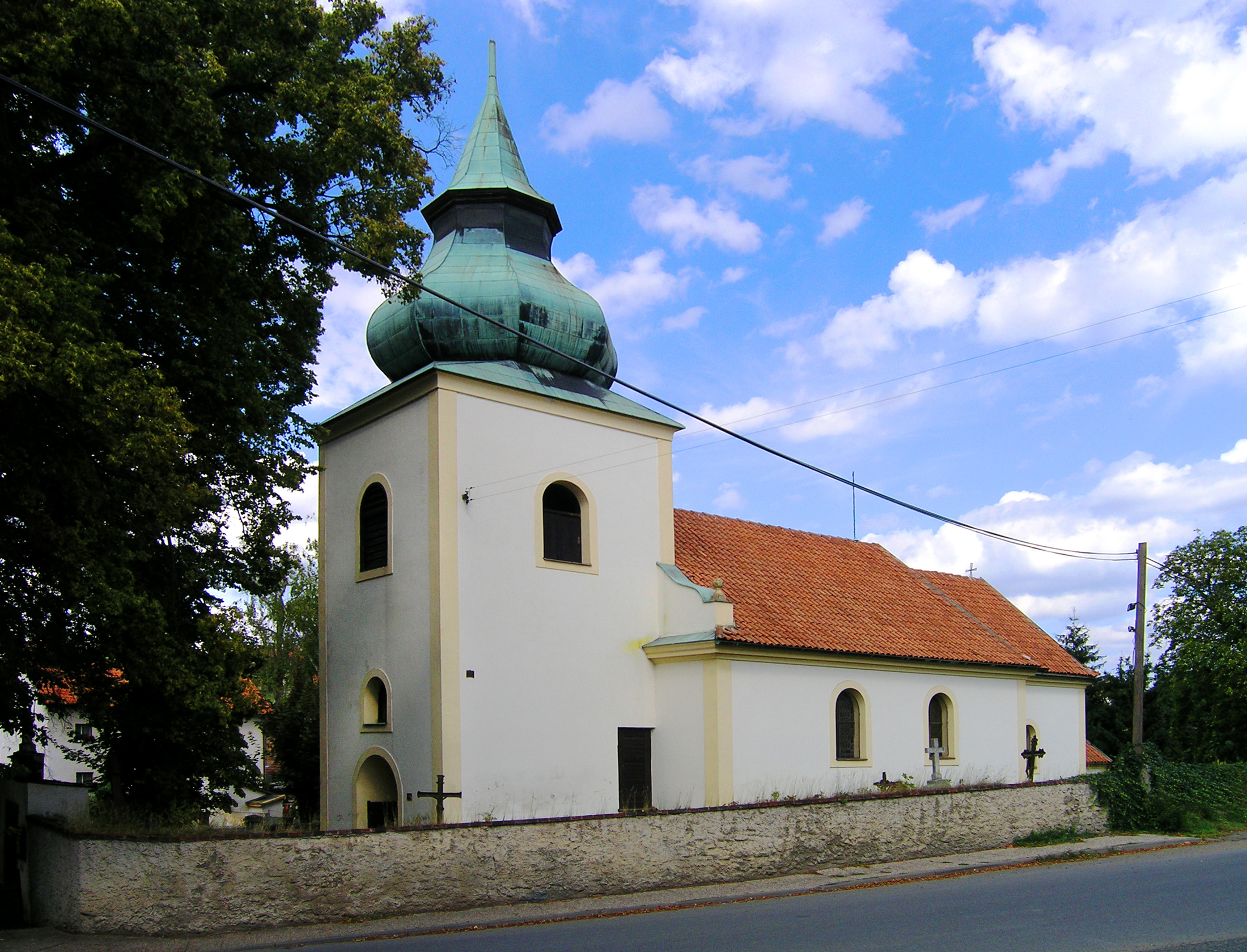
Church of Saint Mary Magdalene

The main landmark of Kunice is the Church of Saint Mary Magdalene. It was built in the Gothic style in the 14th century and rebuilt in the Baroque style in the 17th and 18th centuries.

Berchtold Castle is located in Vidovice. It was built in 1877. Today it serves as a hotel. The ground floor of the castle is open to the public and houses the municipal museum.
