= Sandro (footballer, born 1986) =

Brazilian footballer

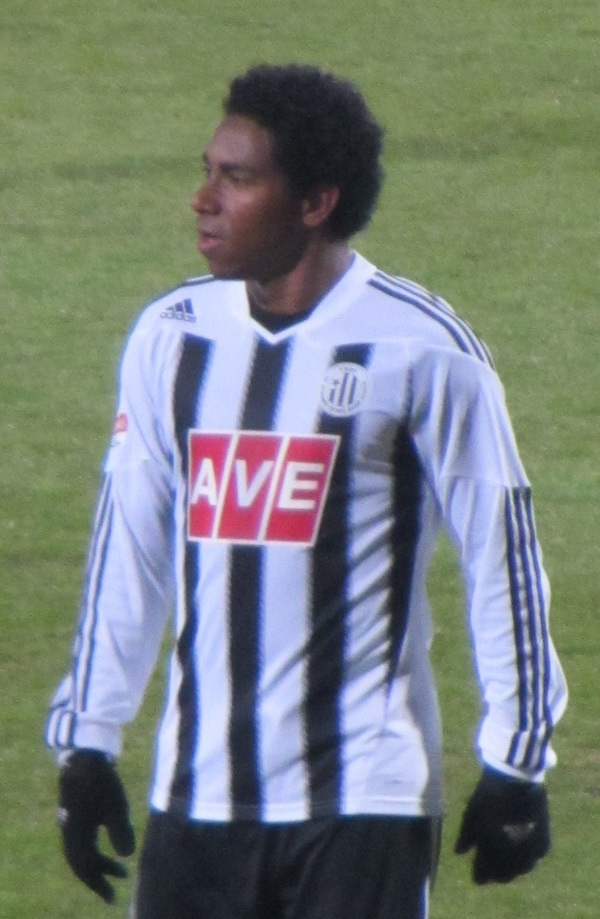

Personal information
- Full name: Sandro José Ferreira da Silva
- Date of birth: 19 March 1986 (age 40)
- Place of birth: Iaçu, Brazil
- Height: 1.77 m (5 ft 10 in)
- Position: Winger

Team information
- Current team: Austria Klagenfurt
- Number: 11

Youth career
- 2002–2004: Vitória

Senior career*
Years	Team	Apps	(Gls)
2002–2003	Penafiel	7	(1)
2004	Vitória	6	(1)
2006–2007	Vasco da Gama	1	(1)
2008–2010	SK Austria Kärnten	46	(8)
2011–2013	České Budějovice	53	(3)
2013–2014	SV Ried	28	(3)
2015	SKN St. Pölten	1	(0)
2016	Annabichler SV	12	(0)
2016–	Austria Klagenfurt	1	(0)
- * Club domestic league appearances and goals as of 7 April 2015

Sandro José Ferreira da Silva also known as Sandro (born 19 March 1986) is a Brazilian footballer who plays for Austria Klagenfurt. His former clubs include SK Austria Kärnten, SV Ried, and České Budějovice in the Czech Republic.
