= Martin Hyský =

Czech footballer (born 1975)

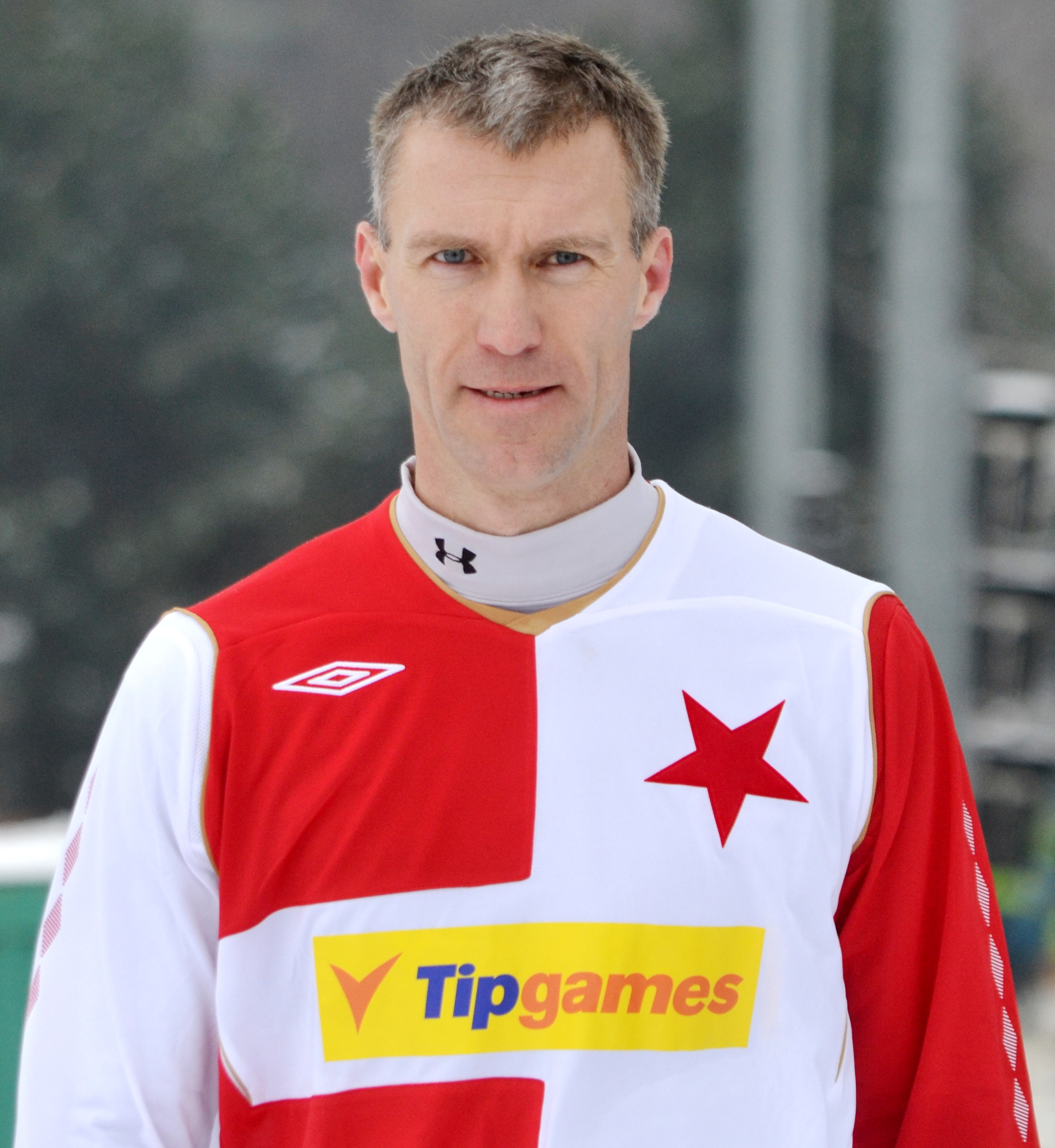
- Hyský in 2014

Personal information
- Date of birth: 25 September 1975 (age 51)
- Place of birth: Prague, Czech Republic
- Height: 1.83 m (6 ft 0 in)
- Position: Defender

Senior career*
Years	Team	Apps	(Gls)
1993–1994	Slavia Prague	12	(0)
1994–1995	FC Slovan Liberec	24	(2)
1995–1996	Slavia Prague	28	(2)
1996	AIK (loan)	6	(0)
1997	Slavia Prague	26	(0)
1998	FC Boby Brno	17	(0)
1999	Bohemians 1905	15	(1)
1999–2002	Slavia Prague	21	(0)
2002–2004	FC Dynamo Moscow	27	(2)
2004–2006	FC Energie Cottbus	47	(1)
2006–2007	Rot-Weiss Essen	30	(0)
2007–2010	Kickers Offenbach	94	(1)
2010	SK Kladno	14	(2)
2011	FK Přestanov		
2011–2013	FK Kunice		
2013–2017	TJ Sokol Královice		

International career
1994–1997	Czech Republic U21	25	(5)

Managerial career
- 2014: Slavia Prague (youth)
- 2014–2017: TJ Sokol Královice (player–coach)
- 2019–2020: Slavia Prague B
- 2020–2021: Slavia Prague (youth)
- 2021–2024: Vlašim
- 2024–2025: Karviná
- 2025–2026: Viktoria Plzeň
Medal record
SK Slavia Prague
Winner	Gambrinus liga	1995–96
- * Club domestic league appearances and goals

Martin Hyský (born 25 September 1975) is a Czech professional football manager and a former player.

== Career ==
After a short spell at FK Přestanov, Hyský moved to FK Kunice in April 2011. In the summer 2013, he then moved to TJ Sokol Královice. In January 2014, Hyský also became head coach of Slavia Prague's U16s alongside his playing duties at Královice. He later left the position at Slavia to become a player-head coach at Královice.

Hyský left Královice in the summer 2017 and returned to Slavia, as an assistant coach of one of the youth teams.

In February 2019, Hyský took charge of Slavias' B-team. In June 2020 it was confirmed, that Hyský would take charge of the clubs U19s.
