= Matěj Marič =

Czech footballer

Personal information
- Date of birth: 11 September 1991 (age 35)
- Place of birth: Czechoslovakia
- Position: Midfielder

Team information
- Current team: TJ Kunice

Youth career
- FK Dukla Prague

Senior career*
| Years | Team | Apps | (Gls) |
| 2011– | FK Dukla Prague | 2 | (0) |
| 2012– | → TJ Kunice (loan) | 0 | (0) |
- * Club domestic league appearances and goals as of 30 June 2012

Matěj Marič (born 11 September 1991) is a professional Czech football player who currently plays for TJ Kunice, on loan from FK Dukla Prague.
