= Doksany =

- Municipality
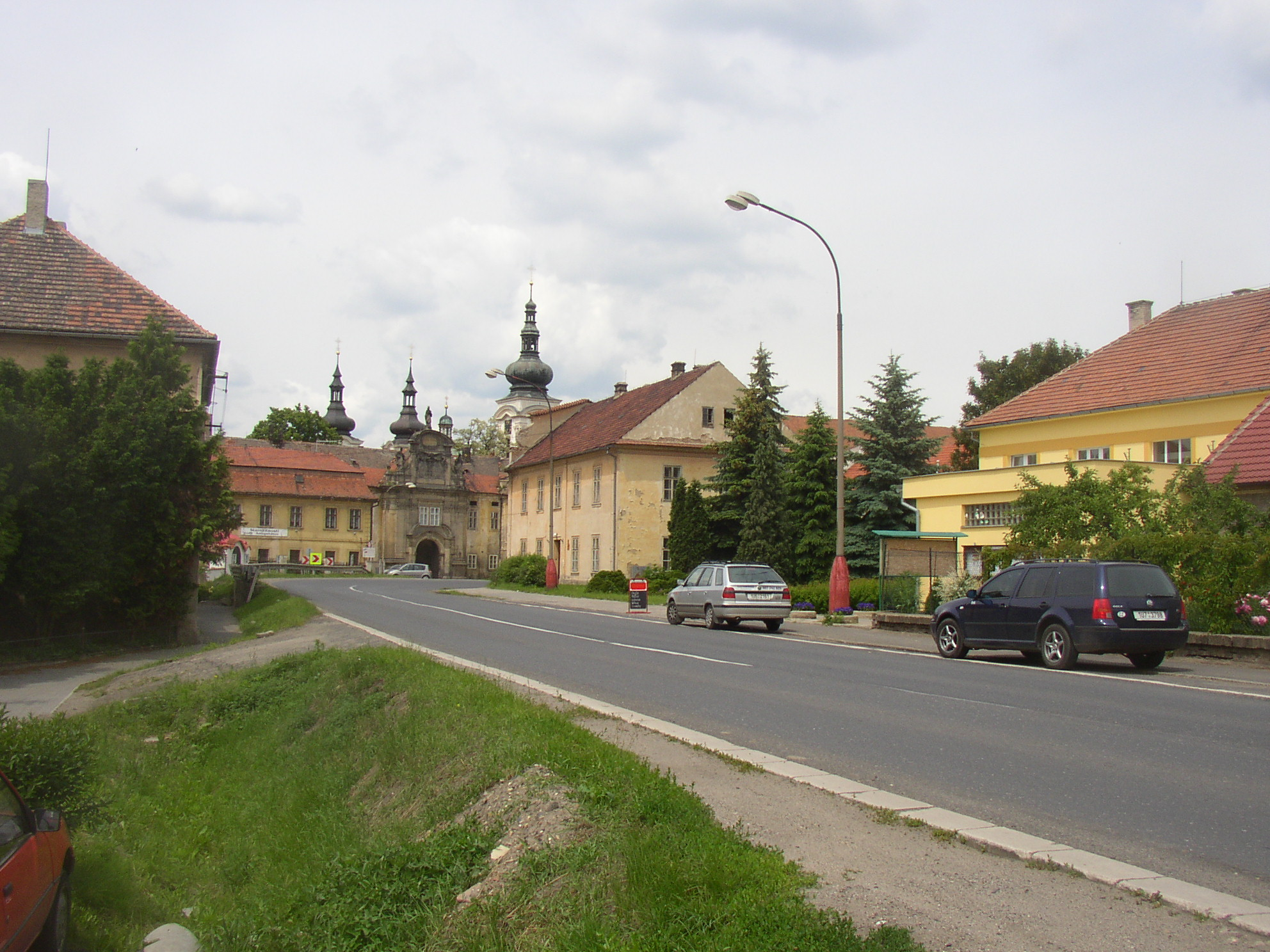
- Centre with the municipal office and gates of Premonstratensian convent

- Flag Coat of arms

- Location in the Czech Republic
- Coordinates: 50°27′18″N 14°9′40″E
- Country: Czech Republic
- Region: Ústí nad Labem
- District: Litoměřice
- First mentioned: 1151

Area
  - Total: 3.12 km^{2} (1.20 sq mi)
- Elevation: 156 m (512 ft)

Population (2026-01-01)
  - Total: 445
  - Density: 143/km^{2} (369/sq mi)
- Time zone: UTC+1 (CET)
  - Summer (DST): UTC+2 (CEST)
- Postal code: 411 82
- Website: www.obec-doksany.cz

Doksany (Czech pronunciation: [ˈdoksanɪ]; German: Doxan) is a municipality and village in Litoměřice District in the Ústí nad Labem Region of the Czech Republic. It has about 400 inhabitants. The municipality is located on the Ohře River in the Lower Ohře Table. It is known for a Premonstratensian convent.

== Etymology ==
The origin of the name Doksany is uncertain. There is a theory that the initial name of the settlement was Dokze/Doksy (of pre-Slavic origin, from the Old English word dox = 'dark') and then it changed to Doksany, modeled after Brozany (now Brozany nad Ohří), which is located on the opposite bank of the Ohře River.

== Geography ==
Doksany is located about 9 kilometres (6 mi) south of Litoměřice, 24 km (15 mi) south of Ústí nad Labem and 42 km (26 mi) north of Prague. It lies in a flat agricultural landscape in the Lower Ohře Table. The municipality is situated on the right bank of the Ohře River, which forms the western municipal border.

=== Climate ===
Doksany's climate is classified as oceanic climate (Köppen Cfb). Among them, the annual average temperature is 9.7 °C (49.5 °F), the hottest month is 19.9 °C (67.8 °F) in July, and the coldest month is 0.0 °C (32.0 °F) in January. The annual precipitation is 480.6 millimetres (18.92 in), of which July is the wettest with 70.8 millimetres (2.79 in), while February is the driest with only 18.9 millimetres (0.74 in).

The extreme temperature throughout the year ranged from −27.0 °C (−16.6 °F) on 22 December 1969 to 41.9 °C (107.4 °F) on 28 June 2026, which was at this time the highest temperature recorded in the Czech Republic.

Climate data for Doksany (1991−2020 normals, extremes 1961−present)
Month	Jan	Feb	Mar	Apr	May	Jun	Jul	Aug	Sep	Oct	Nov	Dec	Year
Record high °C (°F)	17.0 (62.6)	19.6 (67.3)	23.8 (74.8)	30.4 (86.7)	33.0 (91.4)	41.9 (107.4)	38.7 (101.7)	39.4 (102.9)	34.9 (94.8)	29.8 (85.6)	19.3 (66.7)	17.0 (62.6)	41.9 (107.4)
Mean daily maximum °C (°F)	2.9 (37.2)	5.1 (41.2)	9.8 (49.6)	16.2 (61.2)	20.6 (69.1)	23.9 (75.0)	26.3 (79.3)	26.4 (79.5)	21.0 (69.8)	14.4 (57.9)	7.7 (45.9)	3.7 (38.7)	14.8 (58.6)
Daily mean °C (°F)	0.0 (32.0)	1.0 (33.8)	4.7 (40.5)	10.0 (50.0)	14.7 (58.5)	18.0 (64.4)	19.9 (67.8)	19.4 (66.9)	14.5 (58.1)	9.2 (48.6)	4.5 (40.1)	1.0 (33.8)	9.7 (49.5)
Mean daily minimum °C (°F)	−3.5 (25.7)	−3.0 (26.6)	−0.8 (30.6)	2.6 (36.7)	7.0 (44.6)	10.7 (51.3)	12.6 (54.7)	12.2 (54.0)	8.4 (47.1)	4.5 (40.1)	1.0 (33.8)	−1.9 (28.6)	4.1 (39.4)
Record low °C (°F)	−25.4 (−13.7)	−22.5 (−8.5)	−21.2 (−6.2)	−10.2 (13.6)	−2.7 (27.1)	−0.1 (31.8)	2.9 (37.2)	2.8 (37.0)	−2.8 (27.0)	−8.8 (16.2)	−18.8 (−1.8)	−27.0 (−16.6)	−27.0 (−16.6)
Average precipitation mm (inches)	23.9 (0.94)	18.9 (0.74)	27.5 (1.08)	23.2 (0.91)	53.6 (2.11)	65.9 (2.59)	70.8 (2.79)	65.8 (2.59)	41.2 (1.62)	32.6 (1.28)	28.6 (1.13)	28.7 (1.13)	480.6 (18.92)
Average snowfall cm (inches)	10.4 (4.1)	6.5 (2.6)	3.3 (1.3)	0.2 (0.1)	0.0 (0.0)	0.0 (0.0)	0.0 (0.0)	0.0 (0.0)	0.0 (0.0)	0.0 (0.0)	1.6 (0.6)	6.9 (2.7)	28.9 (11.4)
Average precipitation days (≥ 1.0 mm)	6.6	5.2	7.0	5.7	8.6	9.2	9.9	8.7	7.1	7.2	7.3	6.7	89.2
Average relative humidity (%)	83.1	78.8	73.7	65.6	66.5	67.6	66.5	68.2	75.2	81.3	86.0	85.1	74.8
Mean monthly sunshine hours	43.1	75.2	123.7	193.7	229.6	230.6	239.3	231.5	161.8	97.2	44.0	36.0	1,705.8
Source 1: NOAA
Source 2: Czech Hydrometeorological Institute (snowfall and humidity 1991-2020, extremes)

== History ==
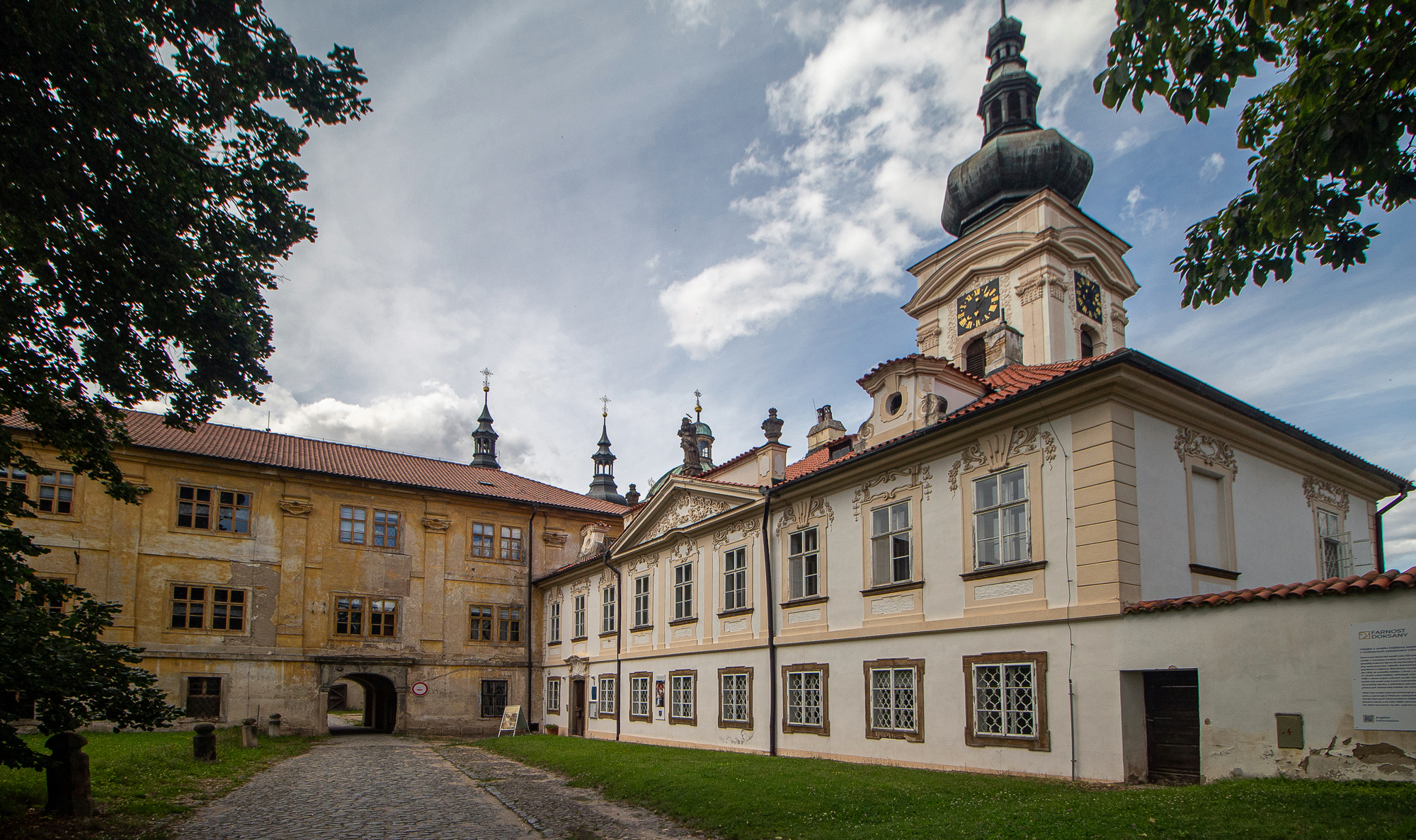
Courtyard of the convent complex

The oldest settlement dates back between 4500 and 2500 BC. In 1993, archaeologists discovered more ancient buildings and settlements that dated back to the same period of time. The first written mention of Doksany is from 1151 by chronicler Vincencius, who wrote about the Doksany Convent. It was probably founded in 1144 by Gertrude of Babenberg and Vladislaus II as the second convent in the kingdom.

The village of Doksany was specifically mentioned in a deed of King Ottokar I from 1226. The convent owned the village until 1421, when the convent was damaged as a result of the Hussite Wars. Properties of the convert were then lent by the Bohemian kings to various nobles. During the reign of King Vladislaus II (1471–1516), the village returned to the ownership of the convent.

Doksany was owned by the Doksany Convent until 1782, when the convent was abolished. From 1782, its properties were managed by the Religious Fund. In 1790, Countess Terezie Kinsky acquired Doksany and began the reconstruction of the monastery into a castle. From 1797 to 1804, the estate was owned by Jakub Wiemmer. From 1804 until the establishment of an independent municipality in 1850, the estate was owned by the Lex of Aehrenthal family.

In 2003, the convent was restored with the help of Premonstratensians from Poland.

== Demographics ==
Historical population

Year	Pop.	±%
1869	625	—
1880	934	+49.4%
1890	857	−8.2%
1900	769	−10.3%
1910	736	−4.3%

Year	Pop.	±%
1921	647	−12.1%
1930	626	−3.2%
1950	489	−21.9%
1961	527	+7.8%
1970	538	+2.1%

Year	Pop.	±%
1980	471	−12.5%
1991	371	−21.2%
2001	369	−0.5%
2011	378	+2.4%
2021	447	+18.3%

Source: Censuses

== Economy ==
There is a small hydropower plant on the Ohře River. It is part of a historic weir from 1937.

== Transport ==
There are no railways or major roads passing through Doksany, but the municipality is located near the D8 motorway from Prague to Ústí nad Labem.

== Sights ==
Doksany is known for a Premonstratensian convent with the Church of the Nativity of Mary. The religious community still lives in it, but under certain conditions it is open to the public.
