= Miroslav Podrazký =

Czech footballer and coach

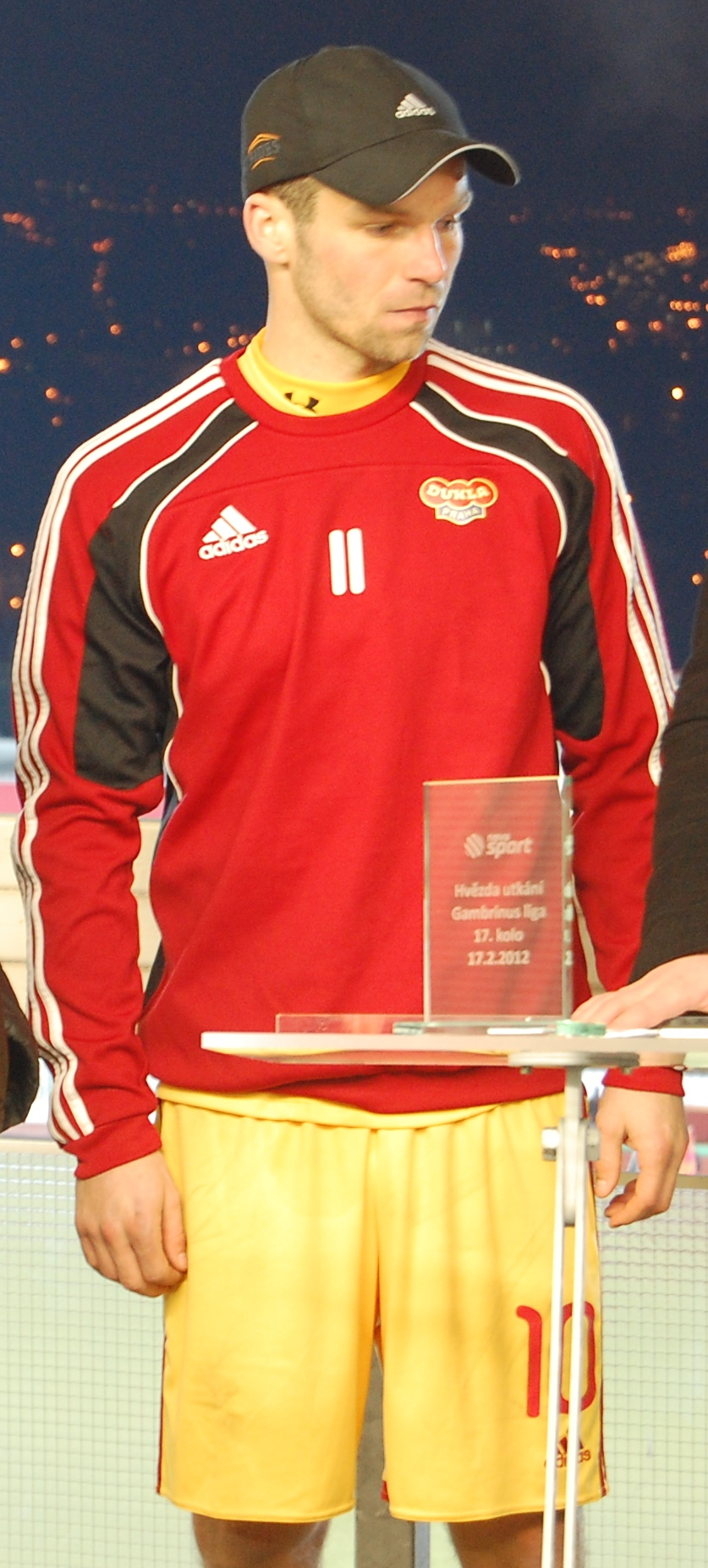

Personal information
- Date of birth: 18 August 1984 (age 42)
- Place of birth: Czechoslovakia
- Height: 1.82 m (5 ft 11 1/2 in)
- Position: Midfielder

Team information
- Current team: Slavia Prague (U19 assistant)

Senior career*
| Years | Team | Apps | (Gls) |
| 2004 | Bohemians Prague | 10 | (0) |
| 2005–2008 | Příbram | 30 | (1) |
| 2007 | → Čáslav (loan) | | |
| 2008–2011 | Sokolov | 89 | (23) |
| 2011–2015 | Dukla Prague | 37 | (2) |
| 2013–2015 | → Viktoria Žižkov (loan) | 57 | (8) |
| 2015 | Slavoj Vyšehrad | 4 | (1) |
| 2016–2019 | Viktoria Žižkov | 70 | (11) |
| 2019 | Slavia Prague B | 11 | (0) |

Managerial career
- 2020: Slavia Prague B (assistant)
- 2020–: Slavia Prague (U19 assistant)
- * Club domestic league appearances and goals

Miroslav Podrazký (born 18 August 1984) is a retired professional Czech football player and current assistant coach of the U19 team of SK Slavia Prague.

== Career ==
=== Club career ===
Podrazký scored his first hat-trick in the Czech 2. Liga for Sokolov in 2010 against Sezimovo Ústí. He finished the 2010–11 Czech 2. Liga as the third-highest scorer with 12 goals, behind Dani Chigou and Miroslav Marković. Having been the top scorer of his club in the 2010–11 season, he joined top flight side FK Dukla Prague in the summer of 2011. At the beginning of the 2013–14 season he moved on to FK Viktoria Žižkov on loan.

=== Later career ===
In February 2019, Podrazký left FK Viktoria Žižkov and became a part of the U21 squad/reserve team of SK Slavia Prague. Retiring at the end of 2019, he became assistant coach for the team, under head coach Martin Hyský. For the following season, the duo took charge of the club's U19 team.
