= Vojtěch Engelmann =

Czech footballer

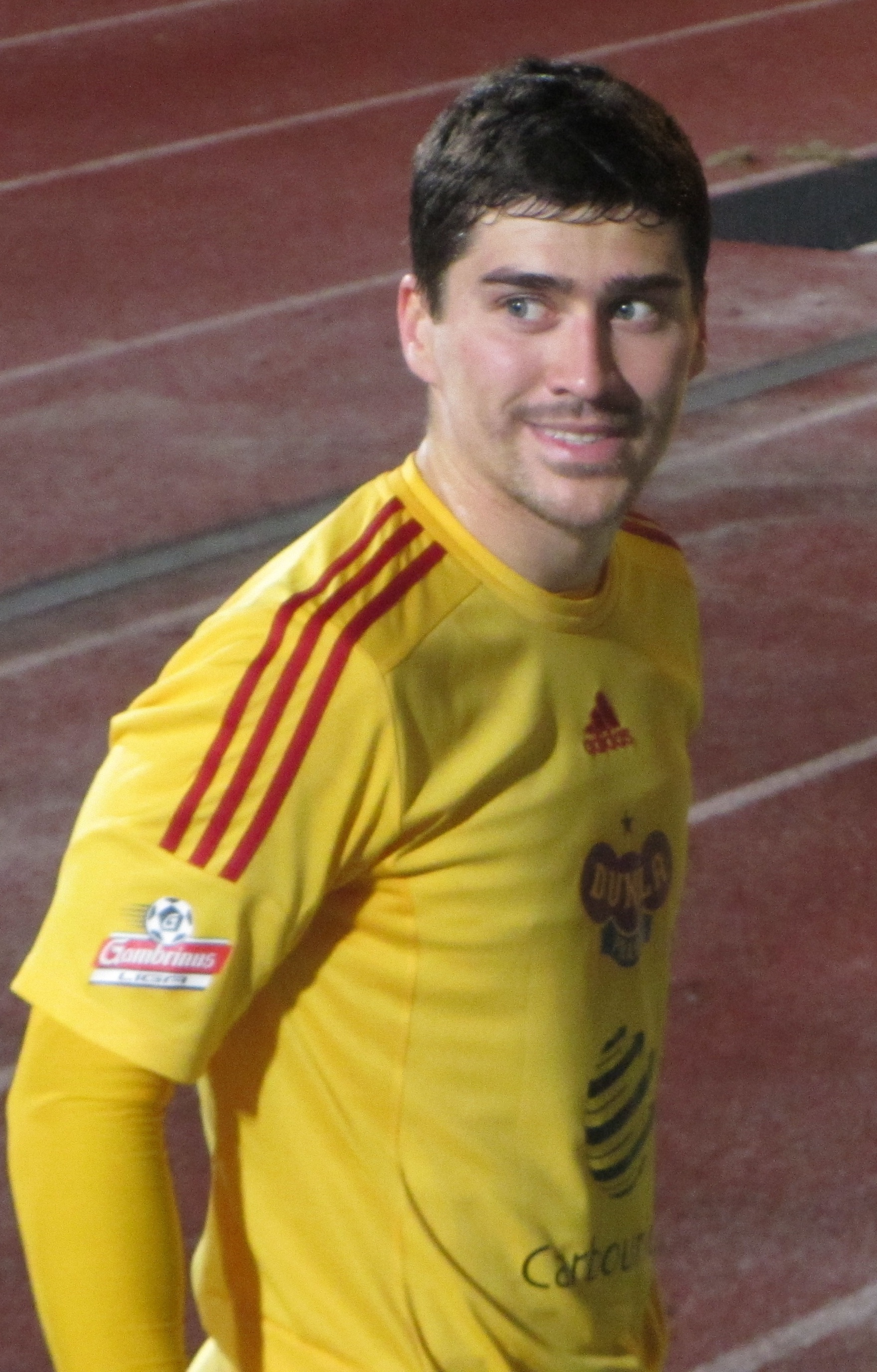
- Engelmann in 2014

Personal information
- Date of birth: 4 July 1989 (age 37)
- Place of birth: Czechoslovakia
- Height: 1.77 m (5 ft 10 in)
- Position: Forward

Senior career*
Years	Team	Apps	(Gls)
2012–2016	Dukla Prague	26	(0)
2013	→ Baník Ostrava (loan)	14	(4)
2014–2015	→ Bohemians 1905 (loan)	9	(0)
2015–2016	→ Baník Ostrava (loan)	8	(0)
2016	Manningham United FC	13	(11)
2016–2018	Viktoria Žižkov	43	(13)
2018	→ SK Benešov (loan)	17	(5)
2018–	SK Benešov	31	(6)
- * Club domestic league appearances and goals as of 18 July 2017

Vojtěch Engelmann (born 4 July 1989) is a professional Czech football player who last played for Manningham United FC

Engelmann arrived at Dukla in January 2012 from third division side TJ Kunice. He made his Czech First League debut at the age of 22 on 17 February 2012 in a match against Viktoria Žižkov. He went to Baník Ostrava on loan during the summer of 2013, scoring four times for Baník before returning to Dukla in December of the same year. He went out on loan to Bohemians 1905 in the summer of 2014 on a year-long deal. Engelmann joined Baník Ostrava on loan for the second time in August 2015. He currently plays for Manningham United FC in the Victorian State League Division 1. In his first season, he played 13 of the 22 games and scored 11 goals which made him the top goalscorer for Manningham in the 2016 season. He also scored two goals in the FFA Cup against Sydenham park which makes him Manningham's record goalscorer in that competition.
