= Milan Halaška =

Czech footballer

Personal information
- Date of birth: 8 January 1988 (age 38)
- Place of birth: Krnov, Czechoslovakia
- Height: 1.81 m (5 ft 11 1/2 in)
- Position: Forward

Team information
- Current team: FK Bohumín

Youth career
- 1994–2004: FK Krnov
- 2004–2005: FC Vítkovice
- 2005–2006: SFC Opava

Senior career*
| Years | Team | Apps | (Gls) |
| 2006–2012 | SFC Opava | 154 | (39) |
| 2012– | FC Zbrojovka Brno | 11 | (2) |
| 2013 | → SK Líšeň (loan) | 6 | (3) |
| 2013 | → NK Inter Zaprešić (loan) | 3 | (0) |
| 2014 | → MFK Karviná (loan) | 12 | (0) |
| 2014– | → MFK Frýdek-Místek (loan) | 13 | (1) |
| 2015 | MFK Vítkovice | - | (-) |
| 2016 | FC Hlučín | - | (-) |
| 2016 | FC Odra Petřkovice | - | (-) |
| 2017 | FK Bohumín | - | (-) |
- * Club domestic league appearances and goals as of 4 August 2017

Milan Halaška (born 8 January 1988) is a Czech football player who currently plays for FK Bohumín.

== Personal life ==
In 2015 Halaška married his long-time partner Petra Neubertová.
