= Marián Geňo =

Czech footballer

Personal information
- Date of birth: 4 October 1984 (age 42)
- Place of birth: Czechoslovakia
- Height: 1.79 m (5 ft 10 in)
- Position: Forward

Team information
- Current team: FC Slavia Karlovy Vary
- Number: 10

Senior career*
Years	Team	Apps	(Gls)
2011–	Sokolov	11	(3)
- * Club domestic league appearances and goals as of 19 November 2011

Marián Geňo (born 4 October 1984) is a professional Czech football player who currently plays for FC Slavia Karlovy Vary.

Geňo scored a hat-trick on his competitive debut for Sokolov in a first round 2011–12 Czech Cup match against Siad Souš. The game finished 5–0.
