= Júlia Wanderley =

Brazilian educator

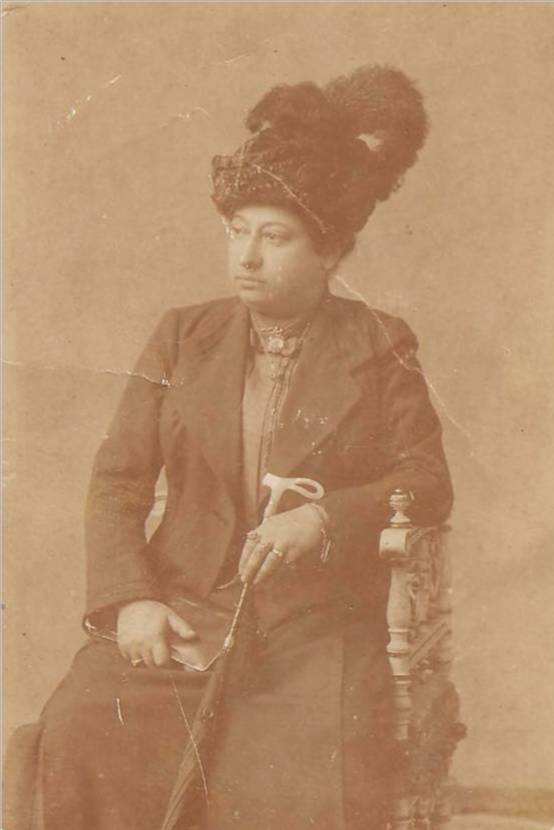
- Born: August 26, 1874
- Died: April 18, 1918 (aged 43)
- Occupation: Educator

Júlia Augusta de Souza Wanderley Petrich, better known as Júlia Wanderley (born Ponta Grossa, Paraná, Brazil, August 26, 1874 — Curitiba, Paraná, Brazil, April 18, 1918), was a Brazilian writer, professor, and educator. In 1893, she became the first woman nominated by her home state of Paraná to serve as a teacher and director of a public school.

== Early Life and Education ==
Júlia Wanderly was born in 1874 in Ponta Grossa, Paraná, but moved with her family to the state capital of Curitiba in 1877. Her father Afonso Guilhermino Wanderley was an artist who painted the interior of the Curitiba Cathedral. Her mother was Laurinda de Souza Wanderley.

In Curitiba, Júlia Wanderley attended the Colégio Saldanha, Colégio Nossa Senhora da Glória, and Colégio Santo Inácio.

After completing her secondary education, in 1890 Júlia Wanderley enrolled in the Escola Normal (Normal School), a teacher training college. Prior to this year, only men had been allowed to enroll in the college; women who studied independently could sit for a final exam but not attend classes. Júlia Wanderley became the in-person first female student, earning her teaching diploma on 21 November 1892.

== Professional career ==
Júlia Wanderley served as director of the 9ª Cadeira de Instrução Primária in Curitiba.

In 1894, she became the director of the Escola Tiradentes.

== Publications ==
Júlia Wanderley wrote articles about pedagogy for many local journals, including Operário Livre, O Artista, and A República.

== Personal life ==
Júlia Wanderley married Frederico Petrich. The couple did not have children but adopted their nephew Júlio Wanderley da Costa Petrich.

Júlia Wanderley died in Curitiba, on April 18, 1918. She is buried in the Municipal Cemetery of São Francisco de Paula.

== Photography Archive ==
Júlia Wanderley amassed a collection of more than a thousand images documenting early twentieth century daily life in Curitiba which are now housed in the Cultural Foundation of Curitia's (FCC) Casa da Memória. Angela Medeiros, a researcher with the FCC, explains the value of the collection saying "Os registros dela capturam o cotidiano, uma curadoria delicada e particular, mas que resulta em uma espécie de álbum coletivo da cidade, com ruas, pessoas, construções e hábitos” ("[Júlia Wanderley's] records capture daily life, with a very personal and nuanced point of view, but what emerges is a kind of collective album of the city, with the streets, peoples, buildings, and habits.")

== Memorials ==
A bust of Júlia Wanderley cast in bronze by João Turin is located in Curitiba's Praça Santos Andrade. There are also several schools named after her - including the Escola Municipal Rural Júlia Wanderley - and a cultural center, the Centro de Cultura Júlia Wanderley.

The Campos Gerais Academy of Letters named their 28th chair in recognition Júlia Wanderley's contributions.
