= Jan Hodas =

Czech footballer (born 1992)

Personal information
- Date of birth: 14 February 1992 (age 34)
- Place of birth: Czechoslovakia
- Height: 1.70 m (5 ft 7 in)
- Position: Winger

Team information
- Current team: Loko Vltavín

Youth career
- 1997–2011: Hradec Králové

Senior career*
Years	Team	Apps	(Gls)
2011–	Hradec Králové	1	(0)
2011–2012	→ FK Bohemians Praha (loan)	9	(1)
2012–2013	→ Zenit Čáslav (loan)	11	(1)
2012–2013	→ Pardubice (loan)	12	(3)
2013	→ Pardubice (loan)	11	(0)
2014–	→ Loko Vltavín (loan)	9	(1)
- * Club domestic league appearances and goals as of 9 May 2014

Jan Hodas (born 14 February 1992) is a professional Czech football player who currently plays for Loko Vltavín on loan from FC Hradec Králové.
