= Tomáš Pospíšil (footballer) =

Czech footballer (born 1991)

Personal information
- Date of birth: 30 January 1991 (age 35)
- Place of birth: Czechoslovakia
- Height: 1.81 m (5 ft 11 in)
- Position: Left back

Team information
- Current team: Narrabeen Football Club
- Number: 8

Youth career
- FK Dukla Prague

Senior career*
| Years | Team | Apps | (Gls) |
| 2009–2015 | FK Dukla Prague | 51 | (1) |
| 2012 | → FK Baník Most (loan) | 16 | (0) |
| 2013–2014 | → FK Pardubice (loan) | 40 | (2) |
| 2014 | → Nové Strašecí (loan) | | |
| 2015–2017 | FK Pardubice | 54 | (2) |
| 2017– | 1. SC Znojmo | 11 | (1) |

International career
| 2008–2009 | Czech Republic U18 | 6 | (0) |
| 2011 | Czech Republic U21 | 0 | (0) |
- * Club domestic league appearances and goals as of 17 May 2018

Tomáš Pospíšil (born 30 January 1991) is a professional Czech football player who currently plays for Narrabeen Football Club. He has also represented his country at youth level. He moved from Dukla Prague on loan to Pardubice in the winter break of the 2012–13 season, extending his loan in July 2013.

== Career statistics ==
As of 25 June 2014

| Club | Season | League | | Cup | | Other | | Total | |
| Club | Season | Apps | Goals | Apps | Goals | Apps | Goals | Apps | Goals |
|---|---|---|---|---|---|---|---|---|---|
| Dukla Prague | 2009–10 | 20 | 1 | 0 | 0 | 0 | 0 | 20 | 1 |
| Dukla Prague | 2010–11 | 20 | 0 | 2 | 0 | 0 | 0 | 22 | 0 |
| Dukla Prague | 2011–12 | 11 | 0 | 4 | 0 | 0 | 0 | 15 | 0 |
| Total | | 51 | 1 | 6 | 0 | 0 | 0 | 57 | 1 |
| Baník Most | 2012–13 | 16 | 0 | 0 | 0 | 0 | 0 | 16 | 0 |
| Pardubice | 2012–13 | 13 | 2 | 0 | 0 | 0 | 0 | 13 | 2 |
| Pardubice | 2013–14 | 27 | 0 | 0 | 0 | 0 | 0 | 27 | 0 |
| Career total | | 107 | 3 | 6 | 0 | 0 | 0 | 113 | 3 |

| Narrabeen Football
