= Martin Šlapák =

Czech footballer

Personal information
- Date of birth: 25 March 1987 (age 39)
- Place of birth: Hořovice, Czechoslovakia
- Height: 1.79 m (5 ft 10 in)
- Position: Forward

Team information
- Current team: Sokol Čížová

Youth career
- Příbram

Senior career*
Years	Team	Apps	(Gls)
2005–2014	Příbram	57	(9)
2013–2014	→ Baník Most (loan)	28	(6)
2015	ŽP Šport Podbrezová	5	(0)
2015–2016	Union Gurten	22	(1)
2016–2019	Králův Dvůr		
2019–	Sokol Čížová		
- * Club domestic league appearances and goals as of 11:45, 22 May 2019 (UTC)

Martin Šlapák (born 25 March 1987) is a Czech footballer, who plays as a forward for Sokol Čížová.

== Career ==
In 2019, Šlapák joined Sokol Čížová.
