= Michal Šmíd =

Czech footballer (born 1986)

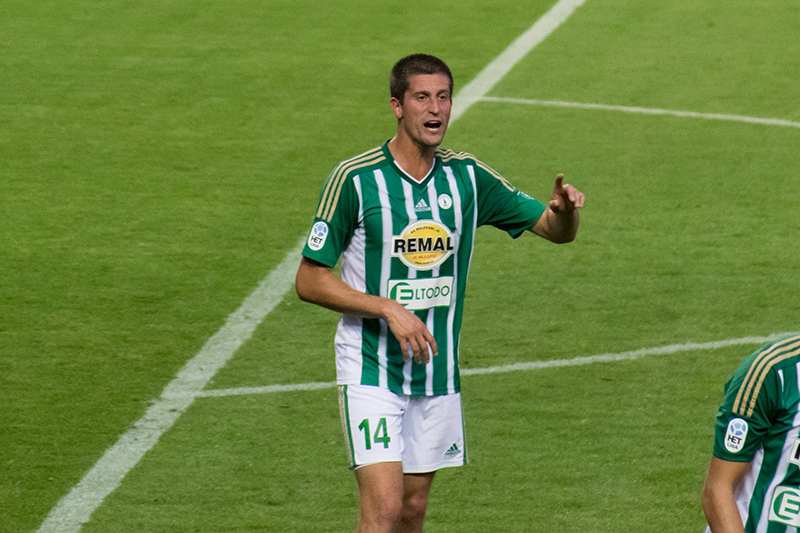

Personal information
- Date of birth: 20 October 1986 (age 40)
- Place of birth: Czechoslovakia
- Height: 1.83 m (6 ft 0 in)
- Position: Centre back

Youth career
- Slavia Prague

Senior career*
Years	Team	Apps	(Gls)
2007–2009	České Budějovice	12	(0)
2009–2012	Dukla Prague	57	(1)
2012–2020	Bohemians 1905	189	(11)
2019	→ Zbrojovka Brno (loan)	7	(2)
2020-	Slavia Prague B	12	(1)
- * Club domestic league appearances and goals as of 22:44, 5 January 2024 (UTC)

Michal Šmíd (born 20 October 1986) is a former professional Czech football player who last played for reserve team of SK Slavia Prague.

== Career ==
Šmíd joined SK Dynamo České Budějovice in the summer of 2007, having played youth football for SK Slavia Prague. On 3 September 2019 he joined FC Zbrojovka Brno on a half year loan from Bohemians 1905.
