= Filip Rýdel =

Czech footballer

Personal information
- Date of birth: 30 March 1984 (age 42)
- Place of birth: Olomouc, Czechoslovakia
- Height: 1.83 m (6 ft 0 in)
- Position: Midfielder

Youth career
- 1989–1994: TJ Hodslavice
- 1994–1999: TJ Nový Jičín
- 1999–2002: Sigma Olomouc

Senior career*
Years	Team	Apps	(Gls)
2002–2008	Sigma Olomouc	61	(1)
2008–2009	MFK Karviná (loan)	15	(3)
2009	Tescoma Zlín (loan)	11	(3)
2009–2010	FC Viktoria Plzeň	14	(1)
2010–2011	FC Zbrojovka Brno	21	(3)
2011–2013	SK Dynamo České Budějovice	56	(4)
2014	Bohemians Prague	10	(2)

International career^{‡}
2001–2002	Czech Republic U-18	12	(1)
2002	Czech Republic U-19	2	(0)
2007	Czech Republic U-21	1	(0)
- * Club domestic league appearances and goals ‡ National team caps and goals as of 3 July 2011

Filip Rýdel (born 30 March 1984) is a Czech former football player. His position is midfield. He played in the Czech First League for FC Viktoria Plzeň, FC Zbrojovka Brno, and SK Dynamo České Budějovice.

== Honours ==
=== Club ===
FC Viktoria Plzeň

- Czech Cup: 2010
