= Jan Zawada =

Czech footballer

Personal information
- Date of birth: 6 June 1988 (age 38)
- Place of birth: Czechoslovakia
- Height: 1.78 m (5 ft 10 in)
- Position: Defender

Team information
- Current team: FC Baník Ostrava
- Number: 16

Youth career
- 1995–2003: Spartak Jablunkov
- 2003–2009: FC Baník Ostrava

Senior career*
Years	Team	Apps	(Gls)
2009–	FC Baník Ostrava	71	(1)
2010–2011	FK Viktoria Žižkov (loan)	21	(1)
- * Club domestic league appearances and goals as of 12 March 2014

Jan Zawada (born 6 June 1988) is a Czech football player who currently plays for FC Baník Ostrava.
