= Martin Jirouš =

Czech footballer (born 1986)

Personal information
- Date of birth: 27 November 1986 (age 39)
- Place of birth: Ústí nad Labem, Czechoslovakia
- Height: 1.95 m (6 ft 5 in)
- Position: Forward

Youth career
- 1992–2005: Slovan Liberec

Senior career*
Years	Team	Apps	(Gls)
2005–2007	Slovan Liberec	5	(0)
2006–2007	→ Zenit Čáslav (loan)	25	(4)
2008	1. FK Příbram	9	(0)
2008–2009	→ Baník Sokolov (loan)	25	(18)
2009–2013	Sparta Prague	5	(0)
2010	→ 1. FK Příbram (loan)	5	(0)
2011	→ Dukla Prague (loan)	13	(1)
2012	→ Sigma Olomouc (loan)	6	(0)
2012–2013	→ Bohemians 1905 (loan)	23	(2)
2013	Wiener SK		
- * Club domestic league appearances and goals as of 24 July 2013

Martin Jirouš (born 27 November 1986 in Ústí nad Labem) is a former professional Czech footballer. He played for Wiener SK in the Austrian Regional League.

Jirouš finished as top scorer in the 2008–09 Czech 2. Liga, scoring 18 goals.

Jirouš played the first half of the 2011–12 Czech First League on loan at FK Dukla Prague, however he was restricted to just two substitute appearances due to knee problems.
