= G. van der Lee Rope Factory =

The G. van der Lee Rope Factory ("Touwfabriek G. van der Lee") in Oudewater was the oldest family business in the Netherlands until it became part of the Hendrik Veder Group in 2013. Royal Tichelaar Makkum is now the country’s oldest family firm. Established around 1545 by Jan Pietersz. van der Lee, G. van der Lee is still one of the oldest companies in the Netherlands.

== History ==
Since its founding in 1545, it has always been located in Oudewater, and has always been owned and managed by direct descendants of rope maker Jan Pietersz. van der Lee. Jan Pietersz. van der Lee’s birth year, which is believed to be around 1545, serves as the factory’s founding year.

=== 1545-1860 ===
Jan Pietersz. van der Lee belonged to what you could call the upper class of Oudewater. He was the proprietor of most ropewalks of Oudewater as the Oudewater ledger of 1579 shows. Under the heading ‘Other income from ropewalk proprietors’ it reads: ‘Received from Jan Pietersz., 15 five-cent pieces for ropewalks previously rented from the city’. The son of Jan Pietersz. (1580–1625), a rope maker too, was the first one to inherit the property from his father. After Jan Pietersz’s death, the family business was handed down to Heijndrick (1620–1697) and Gijsbert Heijndricksz. van der Lee (1645–1694). According to records dating back to 1694, they owned a ‘coarse-thread ropery and ropery house with right of way and right to spin on Agterstraat in Oudewater’. Gijsbert Heijndricksz’s three sons Adrianus, Cornelis and Jan took over the company after his death. Jan Gijsbertsz’s oldest son was Gijsbert, but it was his brother Adrianus van der Lee (1721–1766) who continued the dynasty. Adrianus’ son Cornelis van der Lee (1753–1826) took charge of the business in 1787 with the purchase of ‘a ropewalk and farmland with shed and garden, located at the Bieze, with the garden wall leading to the Amsterdamse Veer in Oudewater’ from his uncle Gijsbert van der Lee.

=== 1860-1919 ===
From the 16th to the 19th century, the craft of rope making remained pretty much unchanged. There were many steps involved in rope making, and each of these steps was done by hand with the aid of simple tools. In the first half of the 19th century the Dutch shipbuilding industry was booming. Many businesses, including the roperies, benefited from this favourable environment. In the 1860s, a change occurred with the gradual arrival of the industrial revolution which also affected the Van der Lee family. Although Adrianus van der Lee (1787–1856) called himself a manufacturer, he was in fact a traditional rope maker. It was his son Gijsbert (1819–1903) who pulled the business into the modern world. In 1880, Gijsbert van der Lee made the brave decision to introduce steam engines into the rope production. He bought an elongated piece of land in the Hekendorp polder just outside Oudewater where the new steam ropery was to be built. In 1886, Gijsbert van der Lee, as stated in the permit issued by the Municipality of Hekendorp, commissioned the construction of a stone and iron building ‘with a kettle to melt the tar needed for tarring the ropes manufactured in the steam ropery’. This led to fierce protests from neighbours. At the turn of the century, a mechanised spinning mill was built next to the steam ropery. On 28 December 1903, the founder of the modern rope factory, Gijsbert van der Lee, died at the age of 84 at his villa ‘Klein Hekendorp’ opposite the factory on the IJsseldijk. Gijsbert’s sons Adrianus and Cornelis Gijsbertus followed in their father’s footsteps and turned the ropery into a general partnership named G. van der Lee.

=== 1919-1938 ===
On 1 July 1919, Cornelis Gijsbertus left the company and G. van der Lee was passed on to his brother Adrianus (1854–1920) and his son Gijsbert (1883–1966). After Adrianus van der Lee’s death on 13 May 1920, a difficult time started for Gijsbert van der Lee. As part owner of the company, he had to share authority with his three brothers Klaas, Jan and Piet, his sister Marretje, his brother-in-law Arie Beijen and his mother Christina Vriesman. Gijsbert van der Lee bought out his family in 1936, on the condition that Gijsbert’s brother Piet Van der Lee became the director of the Old Ropery in Vlaardingen. During this period, the way business was done started to change and the first lorry was bought to transport the ropes.

=== 1960-2013 ===
In 1960, Wim van der Lee and his manager made old and new rope-making technologies meet. They designed large braiding machines that could manufacture heavy hawsers for the shipping and off-shore industries. The ropes for these hawsers were twisted on the old ropewalk. The industry was faced with a major challenge in 1965 when the first synthetic yarn hit the markets which had many times the resistance of manila, and, additionally, is impervious. With developments in the synthetic industry taking place at breakneck speed, the family decided to buy into synthetic fibre, which meant closing their own spinning mill. On 1 July 1984, Wim van der Lee’s daughter and son, Saskia and Gijsbert van der Lee, and their cousin Willem Hendrik Schreijgrond, the oldest son of Christina van der Lee, who is Wim van der Lee’s sister, were appointed as supervisory directors alongside Johan Joseph Breen. Bernhard de Wit was appointed as director. By importing raw materials the family could now specialise. This change in production led to a new factory being built in 1993. Van der Lee’s product range, which is made using modern scutchers and braiding machines, now largely varies to include all kinds of ropes, yet the old craft still lives on at the G. van der Lee Rope Factory; hawsers for fisheries, water sport and replicas of VOC ships and the ropes are still twisted on the 350-metre long ropewalk.

=== 2013-present ===
The G. Van der Lee Rope Factory became part of the Hendrik Veder Group in 2013.
