= Iaçu =

Municipality of Bahia, Brazil

Coordinates: 12°46′01″S 40°12′43″W

- Municipality
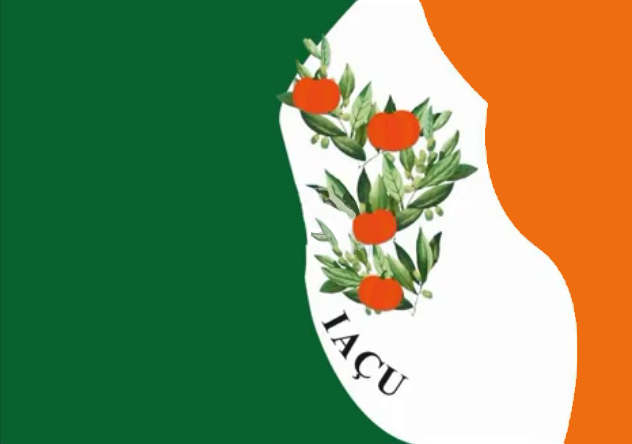
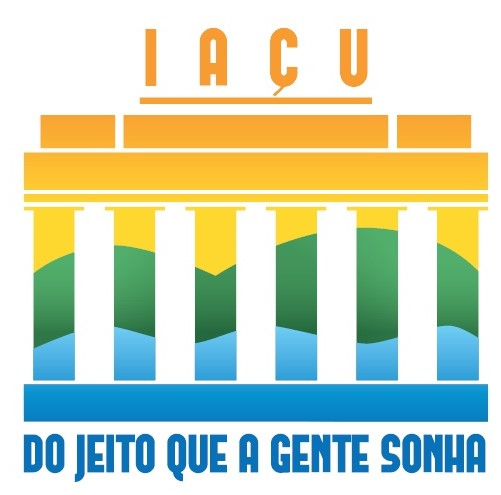
- Flag Coat of arms
- Interactive map of Iaçu
- Country: Brazil
- Region: Nordeste
- State: Bahia

Population (2020)
  - Total: 24,121
- Time zone: UTC−3 (BRT)

Iaçu is a municipality in the state of Bahia in the North-East region of Brazil.

== Notable people ==
- Vanderlei (born 1982), footballer

== See also ==
- List of municipalities in Bahia
