= Vanderlei (footballer, born 1943) =

Brazilian footballer

Personal information
- Full name: Vanderlei Ramildo Augusto da Silva
- Date of birth: 30 October 1943 (age 83)
- Place of birth: Tubarão, Brazil
- Position: Goalkeeper

Youth career
- Hercílio Luz

Senior career*
Years	Team	Apps	(Gls)
1963–1967	Hercílio Luz		
1967–1969	Metropol		
1970	Atlético Paranaense		
1971–1973	São Paulo	34	(0)
1974	America-RJ		
1975	Figueirense		
1976	America-RJ		
- * Club domestic league appearances and goals as of 30 December 2023

Vanderlei Ramildo Augusto da Silva (born 30 October 1943), simply known as Vanderlei, is a Brazilian former professional footballer who played as a goalkeeper.

== Career ==
Born in the city of Tubarão, Santa Catarina, Vanderlei began his career at Hercílio Luz. He also played for Metropol and Athletico Paranaense, where he won state titles. He played for São Paulo from 1971 to 1973, making 34 appearances. He ended his career at America-RJ.

Vanderlei created an agricultural machinery dealership in Florianópolis, and is currently a successful businessman in this field.

== Honours ==
Metropol

- Campeonato Catarinense: 1967, 1969

Athletico Paranaense

- Campeonato Paranaense: 1970
