= David Mikula =

Czech footballer (born 1983)

Personal information
- Date of birth: 30 March 1983 (age 43)
- Place of birth: Czechoslovakia
- Height: 1.80 m (5 ft 11 in)
- Position: Defender

Youth career
- Opava

Senior career*
Years	Team	Apps	(Gls)
2001–2006	Opava	15	(0)
2006–2007	Jakubčovice Fotbal		
2007–2012	Dukla Prague	60	(1)
2012	→ Opava (loan)	11	(0)
2012–2014	Karviná	54	(4)
2014–2016	Opava	16	(0)
2016	→ Vítkovice (loan)		
2016–2020	Vítkovice		
2020	SC Pustá Polom		

International career
2002	Czech Republic U19	7	(0)
2002–2003	Czech Republic U20	4	(0)
- * Club domestic league appearances and goals as of 31 January 2015

David Mikula (born 30 March 1983) is a retired Czech football player. He represented his country at youth level.

== Career ==
Mikula headed on loan to SFC Opava in 2012 in order to play first-team football. At the end of the season, he headed to MFK Karviná on a permanent transfer. He was captain of Karviná in the 2013–14 season, as the club finished in 8th position. He left Karviná in summer 2014 following the expiry of his contract, returning to Opava on a two-year deal.
