= Vanderlei (footballer, born 1982) =

Brazilian footballer

Personal information
- Full name: Vanderlei Mascarenhas dos Santos
- Date of birth: October 19, 1982 (age 44)
- Place of birth: Iaçu (BA), Brazil
- Height: 1.86 m (6 ft 1 in)
- Position: Defender

Youth career
- Marília AC

Senior career*
Years	Team	Apps	(Gls)
2005	Ipitanga		
2005	SER Caxias		
2006	São José		
2007–2008	Bragantino		
2008–2009	Belenenses		
2009	Mirassol		
2009	Sertãozinho		
2009	América (RN)	8	(0)
2010	AA Anapolina		
2010	Botafogo DF		
2010	Bolivar	8	(0)
2011	Caxias		
2012	Paulista		
- * Club domestic league appearances and goals

Vanderlei Mascarenhas dos Santos or simply Vanderlei (born October 19, 1982) is a Brazilian former footballer who played as a defender. He played for Clube Atlético Bragantino in the Campeonato Brasileiro Série B, scoring one goal in eight appearances.
