= Marek Plašil =

Czech footballer (born 1985)

Personal information
- Date of birth: 19 December 1985 (age 40)
- Place of birth: Hradec Králové, Czechoslovakia
- Height: 1.85 m (6 ft 1 in)
- Position: Defender

Team information
- Current team: FC Hradec Králové
- Number: 25

Youth career
- 1990–1997: Sokol Černíkovice
- 1997–2000: Spartak Rychnov nad Kněžnou
- 2000–2003: FC Hradec Králové

Senior career*
Years	Team	Apps	(Gls)
2003–2005	FC Hradec Králové	14	(0)
2005–2006	Union Cheb		
2006–2007	1. FK Příbram		
2008	→ FC Hradec Králové (loan)	6	(1)
2008–2011	1. FK Příbram	77	(2)
2011–	FC Hradec Králové	31	(2)
- * Club domestic league appearances and goals as of 09:41, 20 April 2013 (UTC)

Marek Plašil (born 19 December 1985) is a professional Czech football player.
