= Vanderlei (footballer, born 1977) =

Brazilian footballer

Personal information
- Full name: Vanderlei Silva de Oliveira
- Date of birth: 18 June 1977 (age 49)
- Height: 1.95 m (6 ft 5 in)
- Position: Defender

Senior career*
Years	Team	Apps	(Gls)
1999–2000	América		
2001	Volta Redonda		
2002	Londrina		
2003	FC Spartak-Alania Vladikavkaz	12	(0)
2003–2004	FC Rostov	0	(0)
- * Club domestic league appearances and goals

Vanderlei Silva de Oliveira or simply Vanderlei (born 18 June 1977) is a former Brazilian football player.
