= Brozany nad Ohří =

- Market town
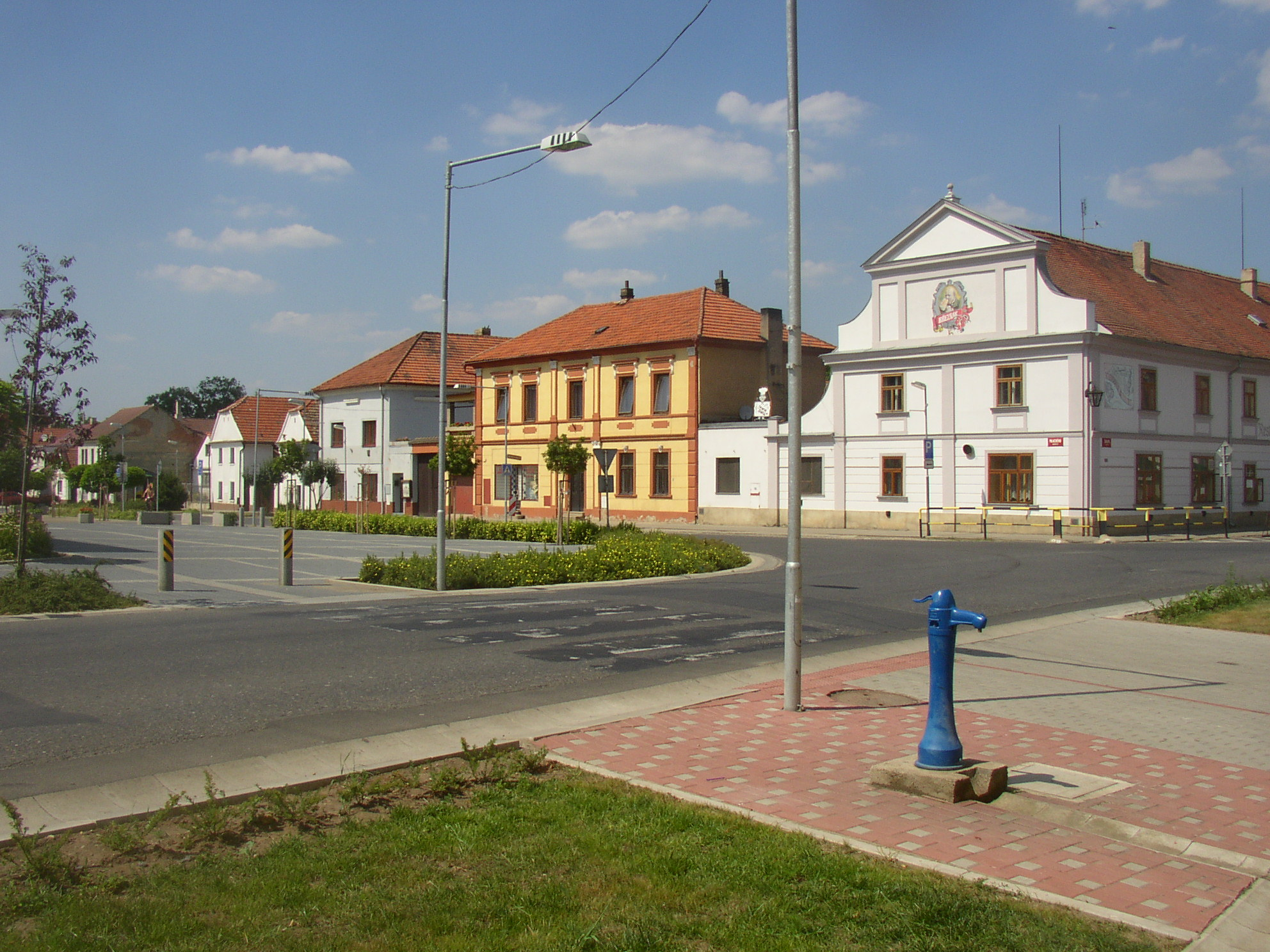
- Centre of Brozany nad Ohří

- Flag Coat of arms

- Location in the Czech Republic
- Coordinates: 50°27′13″N 14°8′44″E
- Country: Czech Republic
- Region: Ústí nad Labem
- District: Litoměřice
- First mentioned: 1276

Area
  - Total: 14.68 km^{2} (5.67 sq mi)
- Elevation: 154 m (505 ft)

Population (2026-01-01)
  - Total: 1,335
  - Density: 90.94/km^{2} (235.5/sq mi)
- Time zone: UTC+1 (CET)
  - Summer (DST): UTC+2 (CEST)
- Postal code: 411 81
- Website: www.brozanynadohri.cz

Brozany nad Ohří (Czech pronunciation: [ˈbrozanɪ ˈnat oɦr̝iː]) is a market town in Litoměřice District in the Ústí nad Labem Region of the Czech Republic. It has about 1,300 inhabitants.

== Administrative division ==
Brozany nad Ohří consists of two municipal parts (in brackets population according to the 2021 census):

- Brozany nad Ohří (1,139)
- Hostěnice (88)

== Etymology ==
The name Brozany is derived from the ford (Czech: brod) that was here across the Ohře River. The people who lived there were called brodjané, later brodzané and then brozané.

== Geography ==
Brozany nad Ohří is located about 9 kilometres (6 mi) south of Litoměřice, 24 km (15 mi) south of Ústí nad Labem and 42 km (26 mi) north of Prague. It lies in a flat agricultural landscape of the Lower Ohře Table. The municipality is situated on the left bank of the Ohře River, which partly forms the eastern and southern municipal border.

== History ==
The first written mention of Brozany is from 1276. It was a property of the provosts from Mělník. After the Hussite Wars, the village was acquired by the royal chamber. The Bohemian Kings pledged the village to various noblemen. In 1601, Brozany was acquired by Jan Zbyněk Zajíc of Hazmburk. From 1617 until the establishment of an independent municipality in 1848, it was owned by the Lobkowicz family. Brozany was promoted to a market town in 1625.

== Demographics ==
Historical population

| Year | Pop. | ±% |
|---|---|---|
| 1869 | 1,116 | — |
| 1880 | 1,265 | +13.4% |
| 1890 | 1,210 | −4.3% |
| 1900 | 1,273 | +5.2% |
| 1910 | 1,345 | +5.7% |

| Year | Pop. | ±% |
|---|---|---|
| 1921 | 1,386 | +3.0% |
| 1930 | 1,384 | −0.1% |
| 1950 | 1,128 | −18.5% |
| 1961 | 1,146 | +1.6% |
| 1970 | 1,122 | −2.1% |

| Year | Pop. | ±% |
|---|---|---|
| 1980 | 1,149 | +2.4% |
| 1991 | 1,047 | −8.9% |
| 2001 | 1,041 | −0.6% |
| 2011 | 1,205 | +15.8% |
| 2021 | 1,227 | +1.8% |

Source: Censuses

== Transport ==
The D8 motorway from Prague to Ústí nad Labem runs through the municipal territory.

== Sights ==
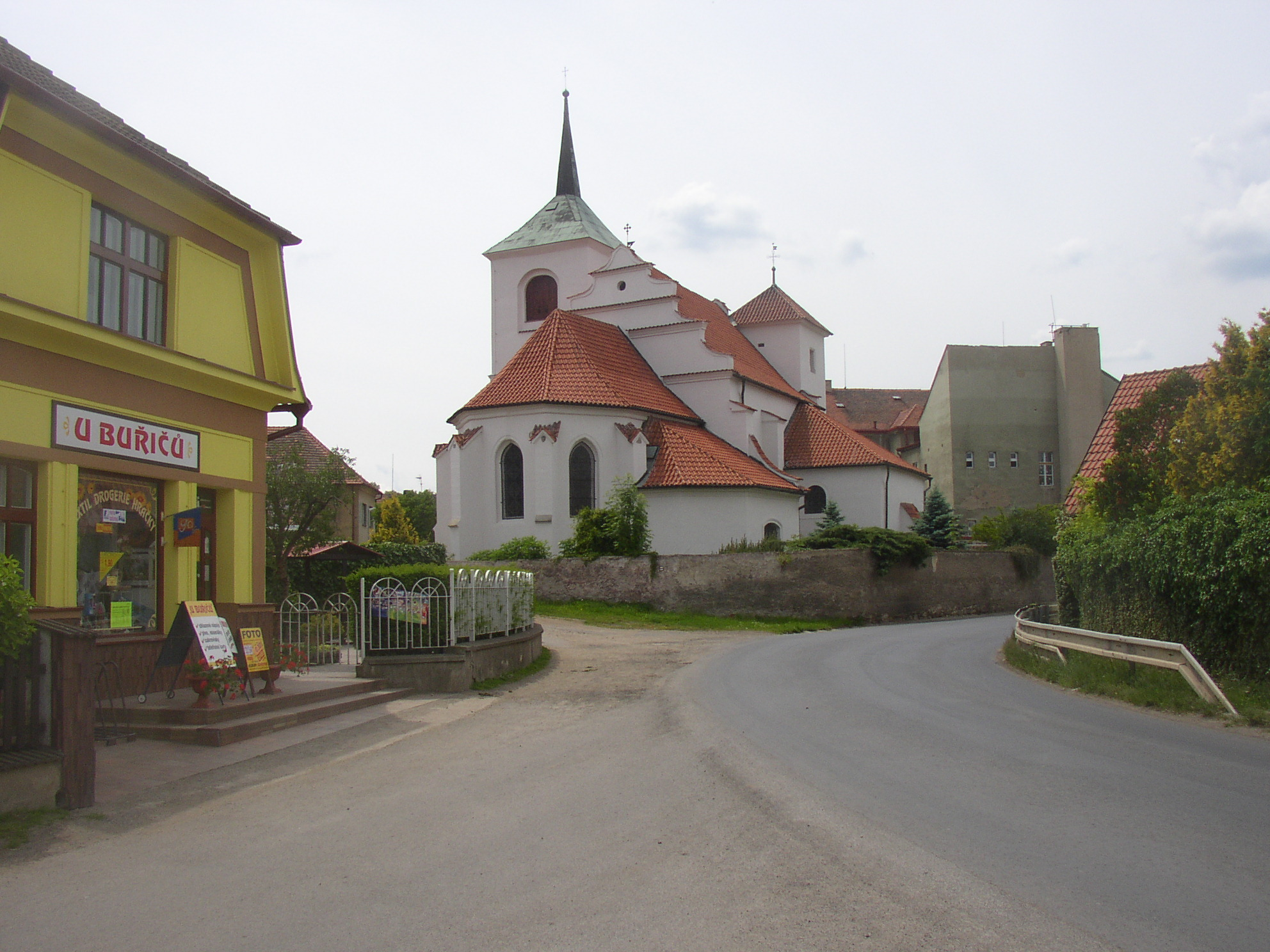
Church of Saint Gotthard

The main landmark of Brozany nad Ohří is the Church of Saint Gotthard. It is originally a Romanesque church, rebuilt in the Gothic and Baroque styles. Next to the church is a Baroque statue of St. John of Nepomuk from 1726.

A notable building is the former fortress. The old fortress was rebuilt in the Renaissance style after 1559 and then after 1601. Today the building is owned by the market town and serves social purposes. There is also an exposition with the history of the region.
