= FK Kunice =

Kunice
- Full name: FK Kunice
- Founded: 1934
- Ground: H + H aréna
- Capacity: 1,000
- Chairman: Vladimír Hašek
- Manager: Karel Tošnar
- League: 1.B třída skupina D (level 7)
- 2021–22: 6th
- Website: http://www.tjkunice.cz/
Home colours

FK Kunice is a Czech football club located in Kunice. It currently plays in the 1.B třída skupina D at the seventh level of Czech football. Kunice spent four years in the third-tier Bohemian Football League from the 2010–11 season until 2013–14.

Kunice won Group A in the Czech Fourth Division in the 2009–10 season. The club played in the third-tier Bohemian Football League from 2010, finishing 4th in their first season. At the end of the 2013–14 season they were relegated, which was partially due to the results of eight of their games being annulled for fielding an ineligible player.

In the Czech Cup, the club reached the third round twice: in 2010–11 they defeated SK Strakonice 1908 and FK Králův Dvůr before losing to First League team FK Mladá Boleslav on penalties. In 2011–12 the club beat SK Union Čelákovice and RMSK Nový Bydžov before losing to First League side FK Jablonec by a 4–6 scoreline.

== Honours ==
- Czech Fourth Division (Group A)
  - Champions 2009–10
