= 2016 Tipsport liga =

Tournament details
- Country: Czech Republic
- Dates: 8 January – 24 January
- Teams: 16

Final positions
- Champions: FC Fastav Zlín

Tournament statistics
- Matches played: 31
- Goals scored: 119 (3.84 per match)

2016 Tipsport liga season was the 18th edition of the Tipsport liga annual competitive football tournament in Czech Republic.

== Groups ==
=== Group A ===
Team	Pld	W	D	L	GF	GA	GD	Pts
Bohemians 1905	3	3	0	0	10	2	+8	9
FC Vysočina Jihlava	3	1	1	1	4	5	−1	4
FK Slavoj Vyšehrad	3	1	0	2	3	7	−4	3
FC MAS Táborsko	3	0	1	2	3	6	−3	1

9 January 2016	Bohemians 1905	2–1	FC MAS Táborsko	Stadion Slavoj Vyšehrad, Vyšehrad
12:00	Mosquera 21'; Acosta 34'		Pilík (yellow card) 5'; Džafić 11'

12 January 2016	FC MAS Táborsko	1–3	FK Slavoj Vyšehrad	Stadion Slavoj Vyšehrad, Vyšehrad
12:00	? (yellow card) 8'; Běloušek 61'		Strnad 45+1' (pen.) ? (yellow card) 60'; Vyhnal 72'; Petrášek 73'

12 January 2016	FC Vysočina Jihlava	1–4	Bohemians 1905	Stadion Slavoj Vyšehrad, Vyšehrad
14:00	Marcin 24' ? (yellow card) 68'		Schick 17'; Gajić 54'; Čížek 61'; Acosta 64'

16 January 2016	Bohemians 1905	4–0	FK Slavoj Vyšehrad	Stadion Slavoj Vyšehrad, Vyšehrad
12:00	Mosquera 2'; Blecha 77', 83'; Mikuš 81'		Soldát (yellow card) 24'

16 January 2016	FC Vysočina Jihlava	1–1	FC MAS Táborsko	Stadion Slavoj Vyšehrad, Vyšehrad
14:00	Vaculík 51'		Nešický 66'

19 January 2016	FK Slavoj Vyšehrad	0–2	FC Vysočina Jihlava	Stadion Slavoj Vyšehrad, Vyšehrad
14:00	Kvida (yellow card) 59'		Voltr 24'; Urdinov 90'

=== Group B ===
Team	Pld	W	D	L	GF	GA	GD	Pts
FK Mladá Boleslav	3	3	0	0	14	0	+14	9
FK Varnsdorf	3	1	0	2	2	3	−1	3
FC Hradec Králové	3	1	0	2	5	11	−6	3
FK Pardubice	3	1	0	2	3	10	−7	3

8 January 2016	FK Pardubice	0–6	FK Mladá Boleslav	Městský stadion, Mladá Boleslav
10:55	Pospíšil (yellow card) 26'		Malpon (yellow card) 24'; Skalák 27' (pen.), 43'; Baroš 31'; Takács 70', 78' (yellow card) 85'; Kozma 79'	Attendance: 100; Referee: Ondřej Ginzel

9 January 2016	FK Pardubice	2–4	FC Hradec Králové	Městský stadion, Mladá Boleslav
11:00	Kudrna (yellow card) 39'; Pánek (yellow card) 77'; Klátil 80'; Prokopec 83'		Černý 10'; Hable (yellow card) 27'; Malinský 35'; Pázler 51'; Javůrek 70'

9 January 2016	FK Mladá Boleslav	1–0	FK Varnsdorf	Městský stadion, Mladá Boleslav
12:00	Glöckner 84'

13 January 2016	FK Mladá Boleslav	7–0	FC Hradec Králové	Městský stadion, Mladá Boleslav
12:00	Baroš 18'; Polom (yellow card) 21'; Skalák 42'; Čmovš 56'; Chramosta 56'; Skácel 74'; Ladra 84'; Křapka 88'

15 January 2016	FC Hradec Králové	1–2	FK Varnsdorf	Městský stadion, Mladá Boleslav
12:00	Zorvan 69'		Daníček 55'; Neuberg 73'

20 January 2016	FK Varnsdorf	0–1	FK Pardubice	Městský stadion, Mladá Boleslav
12:00			Petráň 53'

=== Group C ===
Team	Pld	W	D	L	GF	GA	GD	Pts
FC Fastav Zlín	3	2	1	0	5	3	+2	7
SK Sigma Olomouc B	3	1	2	0	6	4	+2	5
FC Zbrojovka Brno	3	1	1	1	5	5	0	4
SFC Opava	3	0	0	3	3	7	−4	0

9 January 2016	SFC Opava	2–3	FC Fastav Zlín	Sportovní areál Mlýnská, Vyškov
12:00	Žídek 48' ? (yellow card) 50'; Swiech 84' ? (yellow card) 90'		? (yellow card) 33'; Fantiš 45'; Bartolomeu 50' (pen.); Jordan 83'

9 January 2016	FC Zbrojovka Brno	3–3	SK Sigma Olomouc B	Sportovní areál Mlýnská, Vyškov
14:00	Brigant 9'; Buchta (yellow card) 25'; Zoubele 87' (pen.), 89' (pen.)		Hladík 21'; Ševčík (33.); Danis 60' ? (yellow card) 83'

13 January 2016	FC Zbrojovka Brno	0–1	FC Fastav Zlín	Sportovní areál Mlýnská, Vyškov
13:05			Pazdera 15'

16 January 2016	SFC Opava	1–2	FC Zbrojovka Brno	Sportovní areál Mlýnská, Vyškov
12:00	Pyclík 47'		Zavadil 38'; Přichystal 76'

16 January 2016	FC Fastav Zlín	1–1	SK Sigma Olomouc B	Sportovní areál Mlýnská, Vyškov
14:00	Bartolomeu 81'		Texl 15'; Buchvaldek (yellow card) 27'

20 January 2016	SK Sigma Olomouc B	2–0	SFC Opava	Sportovní areál Mlýnská, Vyškov
12:00	Ševčík 71', 73'

=== Group D ===
Team	Pld	W	D	L	GF	GA	GD	Pts
SK Sigma Olomouc	3	3	0	0	9	3	+6	9
FC Baník Ostrava	3	1	1	1	7	5	+2	4
MFK Frýdek-Místek	3	0	2	1	4	7	−3	2
1. SC Znojmo	3	0	1	2	3	8	−5	1

9 January 2016	SK Sigma Olomouc	2–1	FC Baník Ostrava	Andrův stadion, Olomouc
11:35	Vepřek (yellow card) 30'; Vašíček 58', 66'; Hála (yellow card) 69'; Šindelář (yellow card) 82'		Granecny 13'

13 January 2016	1. SC Znojmo	2–4	SK Sigma Olomouc	Andrův stadion, Olomouc
12:00	Serenkov 15'; Stehlík 71'		Moulis 24'; Chorý 34'; Malec 56', 84'

13 January 2016	FC Baník Ostrava	3–3	MFK Frýdek-Místek	Andrův stadion, Olomouc
16:00	Ozvolda 12'; Šašinka 41' (pen.); Szotkowski 87'		Zavadil 5'; Krišto 18' (pen.); Literák 90+2'

16 January 2016	FC Baník Ostrava	3–0	1. SC Znojmo	Andrův stadion, Olomouc
12:00	Hrubý (yellow card) 28'; Červenka 66', 77'; Mičola 73'

16 January 2016	MFK Frýdek-Místek	0–3	SK Sigma Olomouc	Andrův stadion, Olomouc
14:00			Zahradníček 10', 42'; Štěpán 61'

20 January 2016	1. SC Znojmo	1–1	MFK Frýdek-Místek	Andrův stadion, Olomouc
12:00	Stáňa 7'		Byrtus 43'

== Placement Playoffs ==
23 January 2016	SFC Opava	2–4	MFK Frýdek-Místek
15:00	Grussmann 68'; Kuzmanović 87'		Vyskočil 5'; Krišto 38' (pen.); Zavadil 50'; Krcula 57'

24 January 2016	FC MAS Táborsko	1–2	FK Pardubice
11:00	Dzafic 68'		Petráň 48'; Fousek 63'

24 January 2016	FC Hradec Králové	3–3 (3–4 p)	FK Slavoj Vyšehrad
13:00

== Semifinals ==
23 January 2016	FC Fastav Zlín	6–2	FK Mladá Boleslav
13:00	Diop 18'; Malý 43'; Jordan 54'; Holík 61'; Fantiš 76'; Červenka 77'		Takács 37', 73'

23 January 2016	Bohemians 1905	4–2	SK Sigma Olomouc
15:00	Jirásek 42'; Šmíd 78'; Hubínek 82'; Schick 83'		Chorý 36', 51'

== Third place ==
24 January 2016	FK Mladá Boleslav	2–2 (4–2 p)	SK Sigma Olomouc
12:00	Takács 62', 81'		Yunis 48'; Kalvach 88' (pen.)
	Penalties
	Takács (penalty scored); Křapka (penalty missed); Ladra (penalty scored); Kateřiňák (penalty scored); Sivrić (penalty scored)		Yunis (penalty scored); Chorý (penalty scored); Ševčík (penalty missed); Texl (penalty missed)

== Final ==
24 January 2016	FC Fastav Zlín	0–0 (5–4 p)	Bohemians 1905
14:30
	Penalties
	Matejov (penalty scored); Fantiš (penalty scored); Bartolomeu (penalty scored); Hájek (penalty scored); Poznar (penalty scored)		Schick (penalty scored); Jindřišek (penalty missed); Jirásek (penalty scored); Acosta (penalty scored); Mosquera (penalty scored)
