= 2021 Tipsport liga =

Tournament details
- Country: Czech Republic; Malta; Slovakia
- Dates: 6 January – 27 January
- Teams: 16

Final positions
- Champions: FC Spartak Trnava
- Runners-up: MFK Chrudim

Tournament statistics
- Matches played: 19
- Goals scored: 64 (3.37 per match)

2021 Tipsport liga was the twenty-fourth edition of the annual football tournament in Czech Republic. Slovak side FC Spartak Trnava won the league, ahead of MFK Chrudim on goal difference. Also, in Malta takes place the third edition of Tipsport Malta Cup.

== Groups ==
=== Group A ===
- All matches will be played in Xaverov.

Team	Pld	W	D	L	GF	GA	GD	Pts
Dukla Prague	3	1	2	0	10	7	+3	5
AC Sparta Prague B	3	1	1	1	6	7	−1	4
FC Hradec Králové	3	0	3	0	6	6	0	3
FC MAS Táborsko	3	0	2	1	5	7	−2	2

Source: www.tipsport-liga.cz

7 January 2021	AC Sparta Prague B	3–1	FC MAS Táborsko	Xaverov
12:00	Dudl 4' (pen.); Novotný 49'; Sejk 70'		Čapek 51'

10 January 2021	FC MAS Táborsko	3–3	Dukla Prague	Xaverov
11:30	Morales 27'; Penc 34'; Boula 65'		Brito 31' (o.g.); Krunert 47'; Nagy 88'

13 January 2021	FC Hradec Králové	1–1	FC MAS Táborsko	Xaverov
11:30	Baďura 77'		Zezula 2'

16 January 2021	FC Hradec Králové	2–2	AC Sparta Prague B	Xaverov
11:30	Prekop 52'; Vlkanova 56'		Novotný 27'; Sejk 82'

23 January 2021	AC Sparta Prague B	1–4	Dukla Prague	Xaverov
11:30	Hucek 84'		Faleye 10'; Fábry 57'; Ullman 61', 69'

26 January 2021	Dukla Prague	3–3	FC Hradec Králové	Xaverov
11:30	Piroch 28'; Faleye 33'; Fábry 50'		Prekop 26'; Vlkanova 51', 57'

=== Group B ===
- All matches will be played in Horní Počernice.

Team	Pld	W	D	L	GF	GA	GD	Pts
MFK Chrudim	3	2	1	0	7	4	+3	7
SK Slavia Prague B	3	2	0	1	8	5	+3	6
FK Varnsdorf	3	1	0	2	2	5	−3	3
FK Ústí nad Labem	3	0	1	2	5	8	−3	1

Source: www.tipsport-liga.cz

9 January 2021	FK Varnsdorf	0–2	MFK Chrudim	Horní Počernice
11:30			Rybička 33'; Látal 74'

13 January 2021	MFK Chrudim	3–2	SK Slavia Prague B	Horní Počernice
14:00	Rybička 27' (pen.); Čáp 63'; Yu Kang-hyun 84'		Samek 28'; Douděra 45' (pen.)

16 January 2021	SK Slavia Prague B	2–0	FK Varnsdorf	Horní Počernice
14:00	Douděra 13'; Jurásek 90'

20 January 2021	FK Ústí nad Labem	2–4	SK Slavia Prague B	Horní Počernice
11:30	Prošek 38'; Koubek 78'		Višinský 45+1'; Hroník 47'; Kneifel 61'; Kopáček 81'

23 January 2021	FK Ústí nad Labem	1–2	FK Varnsdorf	Horní Počernice
14:00	Kušej 60'		Brak 40' (o.g.); Ondráček 77'

27 January 2021	MFK Chrudim	2–2	FK Ústí nad Labem	Horní Počernice
11:30	Kesner 27'; Verner 83'		Kušej 24'; Jakš 77'

=== Group C ===
- All matches will be played in Trnava, Slovakia.

Team	Pld	W	D	L	GF	GA	GD	Pts
(Slovakia) FC Spartak Trnava (H)	3	2	1	0	6	2	+4	7
(Slovakia) AS Trenčín	3	2	0	1	6	1	+5	6
(Slovakia) MFK Skalica	3	1	1	1	5	5	0	4
(Slovakia) FC ViOn Zlaté Moravce	3	0	0	3	0	9	−9	0

Source: www.tipsport-liga.cz
(H) Hosts
- (Slovakia) FC ViOn Zlaté Moravce withdrew from the competition.

12 January 2021	FC Spartak Trnava (Slovakia)	1–0	(Slovakia) AS Trenčín	Trnava, Slovakia
14:00	Pirinen 29' (o.g.)

19 January 2021	FC Spartak Trnava (Slovakia)	2–2	(Slovakia) MFK Skalica	Trnava, Slovakia
14:00	Olejník 28'; Benovič 31'		Šebesta 51'; Nemergut 75'

26 January 2021	MFK Skalica (Slovakia)	0–3	(Slovakia) AS Trenčín	Trnava, Slovakia
14:00			Demitra 53'; Kmeť 58'; Tučný 64'

== Tipsport Malta Cup ==
=== Semifinals ===
6 January 2021	FC Zbrojovka Brno (Czech Republic)	0–2	(Austria) WSG Swarovski Tirol	Ta' Qali
15:00			Dedić 67'; Frederiksen 69'	Stadium: National Stadium

6 January 2021	SK Sigma Olomouc (Czech Republic)	2–1	(Slovakia) FC Spartak Trnava	Ta' Qali
19:00	Daněk 58'; Radić 89'		Kotlár 84'	Stadium: National Stadium

=== Third place ===
9 January 2021	FC Zbrojovka Brno (Czech Republic)	1–0	(Slovakia) FC Spartak Trnava	Ta' Qali
15:00	Fousek 29' (pen.)			Stadium: National Stadium

=== Final ===
9 January 2021	WSG Swarovski Tirol (Austria)	1–1 (5–4 p)	(Czech Republic) SK Sigma Olomouc	Ta' Qali
19:00	Hager 75'		Zmrzlý 39'	Stadium: National Stadium
	Penalties
	Naschberger (penalty scored); Smith (penalty scored); Toplitsch (penalty scored); Soares (penalty scored); Dedić (penalty scored)		Vepřek (penalty scored); Nešpor (penalty scored); Yunis (penalty scored); Beneš (penalty scored); Poulolo (penalty missed)

== Goalscorers ==
3 goals

- (Czech Republic) Adam Vlkanova

2 goals

- (Czech Republic) Martin Douděra
- (Czech Republic) Vasil Kušej
- (Czech Republic) Ondřej Novotný
- (Czech Republic) Petr Rybička
- (Czech Republic) Václav Sejk
- (Nigeria) Sunday Faleye
- (Slovakia) Marek Fábry
- (Slovakia) Ondřej Ullman
- (Slovakia) Erik Prekop

1 goal

- (Czech Republic) Rostislav Baďura
- (Czech Republic) Jiří Boula
- (Czech Republic) Roman Čáp
- (Czech Republic) David Čapek
- (Czech Republic) Václav Dudl
- (Czech Republic) Lukáš Hroník
- (Czech Republic) Zdeněk Hucek
- (Czech Republic) Karel Jakš
- (Czech Republic) Matěj Jurásek
- (Czech Republic) Ondřej Kesner
- (Czech Republic) Jonáš Kneifel
- (Czech Republic) Jakub Kopáček
- (Czech Republic) Matěj Koubek
- (Czech Republic) Štěpán Krunert
- (Czech Republic) David Látal
- (Czech Republic) Adam Ondráček
- (Czech Republic) Václav Penc
- (Czech Republic) Jiří Piroch
- (Czech Republic) Václav Prošek
- (Czech Republic) Daniel Samek
- (Czech Republic) Miroslav Verner
- (Czech Republic) Denis Višinský
- (Czech Republic) Josef Zezula
- (France) Hugo Morales
- (Slovakia) Samuel Benovič
- (Slovakia) Lucas Demitra
- (Slovakia) Matúš Kmeť
- (Slovakia) Filip Nagy
- (Slovakia) Richard Nemergut
- (Slovakia) Stanislav Olejník
- (Slovakia) Daniel Šebesta
- (Slovakia) Adam Tučný
- (South Korea) Yu Kang-hyun

1 own goal

- (Czech Republic) Vojtěch Brak
- (Finland) Juha Pirinen
- (Netherlands) Elso Brito

Tipsport Malta Cup
1 goal

- (Austria) Stefan Hager
- (Croatia) Dominik Radić
- (Czech Republic) Kryštof Daněk
- (Czech Republic) Adam Fousek
- (Czech Republic) Ondřej Zmrzlý
- (Denmark) Nikolai Baden Frederiksen
- (Slovakia) Thomas Kotlár
- (Slovenia) Zlatko Dedić
