= 2022 Tipsport liga =

Tournament details
- Country: Czech Republic; Malta; Slovakia
- Dates: 6 – 29 January 2022
- Teams: 20

Final positions
- Champions: (Czech Republic) FK Mladá Boleslav
- Runners-up: (Slovakia) AS Trenčín

Tournament statistics
- Matches played: 30
- Goals scored: 117 (3.9 per match)
- Top goal scorer(s): (Czech Republic) Robert Bartolomeu (Czech Republic) Jan Hladík (Czech Republic) Matěj Šín (3 goals)

2022 Tipsport liga is the twenty-fifth edition of the annual football tournament in Czech Republic. Also, in Malta was the second edition of Tipsport Malta Cup.

== Groups ==
=== Group A ===
Pos	Team	Pld	W	D	L	GF	GA	GD	Pts
1	FK Jablonec	3	2	0	1	8	6	+2	6
2	FK Dukla Prague	3	2	0	1	6	5	+1	6
3	Bohemians 1905	3	2	0	1	4	3	+1	6
4	AC Sparta Prague B	3	0	0	3	4	8	−4	0

Source: www.tipsport-liga.cz
Rules for classification: Group stage tiebreakers

8 January 2022	Bohemians 1905	2–0	AC Sparta Prague B	Prague
11:30	Nazarov 41'; Koubek 50'	Report		Stadium: Na Chvalech; Referee: Dominik Stary

8 January 2022	FK Jablonec	2–3	FK Dukla Prague	Prague
14:00	Ikaunieks 10'; Nykrín 75'	Report	Adediran 6'; Kim Seung-bin 22'; Buchvaldek 45' (pen.)	Stadium: Na Chvalech; Referee: Lukáš Nehasil

11 January 2022	FK Jablonec	3–2	AC Sparta Prague B	Prague
11:30	Malínský 28', 50'; Ikaunieks 57'	Report	Dudl 60'; Žížala 70'	Stadium: Na Chvalech

12 January 2022	FK Dukla Prague	0–1	Bohemians 1905	Prague
11:30		Report	Nový 35'	Stadium: Na Chvalech; Attendance: 35

15 January 2022	Bohemians 1905	1–3	FK Jablonec	Prague
11:30	Koubek 62'	Report	Houska 38'; Kratochvíl 69'; Ali-Abubakar 87'	Stadium: Na Chvalech; Referee: Dominik Stary

15 January 2022	AC Sparta Prague B	2–3	FK Dukla Prague	Prague
14:00	Vydra 10'; Turyna 65'	Report	Šebrle 51'; Adediran 63'; Kim Seung-bin 80'	Stadium: Na Chvalech

=== Group B ===
Pos	Team	Pld	W	D	L	GF	GA	GD	Pts
1	FK Mladá Boleslav	3	3	0	0	14	2	+12	9
2	FK Teplice	3	1	1	1	6	7	−1	4
3	FC MAS Táborsko	3	1	1	1	4	10	−6	4
4	FK Varnsdorf	3	0	0	3	1	6	−5	0

Source: www.tipsport-liga.cz
Rules for classification: Group stage tiebreakers

8 January 2022	FK Mladá Boleslav	7–0	FC MAS Táborsko	Mladá Boleslav
11:30	Fila 35'; Douděra 42'; Mašek 45'; Mužík 66'; Pech 76'; Matějovský 80' (pen.); Škoda 87'	Report		Stadium: Městský stadion Referee: Jan Petřík

8 January 2022	FK Teplice	2–0	FK Varnsdorf	Mladá Boleslav
14:00	Fortelný 4'; Moulis 53'	Report		Stadium: Městský stadion

12 January 2022	FK Mladá Boleslav	4–1	FK Teplice	Mladá Boleslav
11:30	Pech 55'; Hlavatý 59'; Ewerton 67', 89'	Report	Trubač 25'	Stadium: Městský stadion Attendance: 160; Referee: Tomáš Klíma

15 January 2022	FK Varnsdorf	1–3	FK Mladá Boleslav	Mladá Boleslav
11:30	Velich 34'	Report	Ladra 19' (pen.); Preisler 22'; Mašek 59'	Stadium: Městský stadion

15 January 2022	FK Teplice	3–3	FC MAS Táborsko	Mladá Boleslav
14:00	Kosek 22' (o.g.); Žák 83'; Vondrášek 90'	Report	Robakidze 27', 50'; Kubovský 87'	Stadium: Městský stadion

22 January 2022	FC MAS Táborsko	1–0	FK Varnsdorf	Mladá Boleslav
14:00	Mach 59'			Stadium: Městský stadion

=== Group C ===
Pos	Team	Pld	W	D	L	GF	GA	GD	Pts
1	FC Baník Ostrava	3	2	0	1	9	6	+3	6
2	Prostějov	3	2	0	1	5	2	+3	6
3	Karviná	3	2	0	1	5	6	−1	6
4	FK Pardubice	3	0	0	3	4	9	−5	0

Source: www.tipsport-liga.cz
Rules for classification: Group stage tiebreakers

6 January 2022	FC Baník Ostrava	5–2	MFK Karviná	Ostrava
11:30	Šín 6', 16'; Cienciala 11'; Boula 37'; Boháč 84'	Report	Papadopulos 15'; Teplan 81'	Stadium: Městský stadion Referee: Jan Machálek

8 January 2022	FK Pardubice	2–4	FC Baník Ostrava	Ostrava
14:00	Jirásek 2'; Huf 83'	Report	Jaroň 27'; Šín 36'; Smékal 62', 79' (pen.)	Stadium: Městský stadion

13 January 2022	Karviná	2–1	FK Pardubice	Ostrava
14:00	Durosinmi 58'; Huf 80'	Report	Stropek 51' (o.g.)	Stadium: Zimní stadion Referee: Petr Dorušák

15 January 2022	FC Baník Ostrava	0–2	Prostějov	Ostrava
11:30		Report	Bartolomeu 60', 67'	Stadium: Zimní stadion Referee: Filip Kotala

19 January 2022	Prostějov	0–1	Karviná	Ostrava
11:30			Jursa 45+2'	Stadium: Zimní stadion

26 January 2022	Prostějov	3–1	FK Pardubice	Ostrava
12:00	Bartolomeu 38'; Sečkář 61'; Stříž 70'		Sychra 80'	Stadium: Zimní stadion

=== Group D ===
Pos	Team	Pld	W	D	L	GF	GA	GD	Pts
1	(Slovakia) AS Trenčín	3	2	1	0	5	2	+3	7
2	SK Sigma Olomouc	3	2	0	1	6	4	+2	6
3	FC Zbrojovka Brno	3	1	0	2	5	6	−1	3
4	MFK Vyškov	3	0	1	2	4	8	−4	1

Source: www.tipsport-liga.cz
Rules for classification: Group stage tiebreakers

12 January 2022	SK Sigma Olomouc	4–2	MFK Vyškov	Brno
16:00	Matoušek 16'; Slaměna 38' (pen.); Uriča 51'; Spáčil 66'	Report	Chwaszcz 6'; Vintr 68'	Stadium: Training youth center Referee: Vit Zaoral

14 January 2022	AS Trenčín (Slovakia)	1–0	SK Sigma Olomouc	Trenčín
16:00	Jendrišek 17' (pen.)	Report		Stadium: Štadión Sihoť; Referee: Balint Kišš

18 January 2022	AS Trenčín (Slovakia)	1–1	MFK Vyškov	Trenčín
19:00	Ghali 88'		Cabadaj 87'	Stadium: Štadión Sihoť

22 January 2022	MFK Vyškov	1–3	FC Zbrojovka Brno	Brno
11:30	Cabadaj 23' (pen.)		Hladík 5', 84', 89'	Stadium: Training youth center

26 January 2022	FC Zbrojovka Brno	1–3	(Slovakia) AS Trenčín	Brno
14:00	Přichystal 72'		Letenay 9'; Ikoba 79', 85'	Stadium: Training youth center

29 January 2022	SK Sigma Olomouc	2–1	FC Zbrojovka Brno	Brno
16:00	Chytil 14' (pen.); Zifčák 20'		Štepanovský 89'	Stadium: Training youth center Attendance: 150; Referee: Jan Machálek

=== Group E ===
Pos	Team	Pld	W	D	L	GF	GA	GD	Pts
1	(Slovakia) FK Senica	3	2	0	1	5	3	+2	6
2	(Slovakia) FC ViOn Zlaté Moravce	3	1	1	1	6	5	+1	4
3	(Slovakia) MFK Skalica	3	1	1	1	1	1	0	4
4	(Slovakia) FC Spartak Trnava	3	1	0	2	5	8	−3	3

Source: www.tipsport-liga.cz
Rules for classification: Group stage tiebreakers

10 January 2022	FC Spartak Trnava (Slovakia)	1–3	(Slovakia) FK Senica	Senec
11:30	Olejník 74'	Report	Niarchos 23' (pen.); Šumbera 37'; Mihál 87'	Stadium: NTC Senec; Referee: Adam Somoláni

12 January 2022	MFK Skalica (Slovakia)	0–1	(Slovakia) FC Spartak Trnava	Senec
11:30		Report	Jendrek 76'	Stadium: NTC Senec

15 January 2022	FK Senica (Slovakia)	0–1	(Slovakia) MFK Skalica	Senec
11:30		Report	Štursa 43'	Stadium: NTC Senec

15 January 2022	FC Spartak Trnava (Slovakia)	3–5	(Slovakia) FC ViOn Zlaté Moravce	Senec
14:00	Iván 45+1' (pen.); Spáčil 67'; Olejník 84'	Report	Kolesár 29'; Sloboda 30'; Horák 68'; Bednár 73'; Švec 86'	Stadium: NTC Senec

19 January 2022	FC ViOn Zlaté Moravce (Slovakia)	0–0	(Slovakia) MFK Skalica	Senec
11:30				Stadium: NTC Senec

22 January 2022	FC ViOn Zlaté Moravce (Slovakia)	1–2	(Slovakia) FK Senica	Senec
11:30	? 32'		Piroska 57'; Mihál 68'	Stadium: NTC Senec

== 2022 Tipsport Malta Cup ==
Pos	Team	Pld	W	D	L	GF	GA	GD	Pts
1	(Czech Republic) SK Sigma Olomouc (C)	3	3	0	0	9	2	+7	9
2	(Slovakia) FC Spartak Trnava	3	1	1	1	5	4	+1	4
3	(Denmark) AaB	3	0	2	1	3	6	−3	2
4	(Austria) WSG Tirol	3	0	1	2	2	7	−5	1

Source: www.tipsportmaltacup.com
Rules for classification: Group stage tiebreakers
(C) Champions

18 January 2022	FC Spartak Trnava (Slovakia)	2–0	(Austria) WSG Tirol	Ta' Qali
17:00	Iván 51'; Sabol 83'	Report		Stadium: National Stadium

18 January 2022	SK Sigma Olomouc (Czech Republic)	3–0	(Denmark) AaB	Ta' Qali
21:00	Jemelka 40'; Greššák 59'; Chytil 82'			Stadium: National Stadium

21 January 2022	WSG Tirol (Austria)	2–2	(Denmark) AaB	Ta' Qali
17:00	Wallner 75'; Vrioni 85' (pen.)		Fossum 21'; Høgh 88'	Stadium: National Stadium

21 January 2022	SK Sigma Olomouc (Czech Republic)	3–2	(Slovakia) FC Spartak Trnava	Ta' Qali
21:00	Daněk 27'; Růsek 68'; Zmrzlý 86'		Iván 9'; Jendrek 19'	Stadium: National Stadium

24 January 2022	FC Spartak Trnava (Slovakia)	1–1	(Denmark) AaB	Ta' Qali
13:30	Iván 6'		Makarić 41'	Stadium: National Stadium; Referee: Alex Johnson

24 January 2022	SK Sigma Olomouc (Czech Republic)	3–0	(Austria) WSG Tirol	Ta' Qali
17:30	Matoušek 11'; Růsek 15'; Uriča 32'			Stadium: National Stadium; Referee: Matthew De Gabriele
