= 2014–15 FK Dukla Prague season =

Dukla Prague
2014–15 season
- Chairman: Michal Prokeš
- Manager: Luboš Kozel
- Stadium: Stadion Juliska
- Czech First League: 6th
- Czech Cup: Second Round
- Top goalscorer: League: Jean-David Beauguel (8); All: Jean-David Beauguel (8)
- Highest home attendance: 6,348 v Sparta Prague (24 August 2014)
- Lowest home attendance: 734 v Příbram (28 October 2014)
- Average home league attendance: 2,516
Home colours	Away colours

The 2014–15 season was Dukla Prague's fourth consecutive season in the Czech First League. In August 2014 the club released new burgundy and yellow home and away shirts, the first time the club had burgundy as their home colour since the 1970s.

== Players ==
=== Squad information ===
As of 11 September 2014.

Note: Flags indicate national team as defined under FIFA eligibility rules; some limited exceptions apply. Players may hold more than one non-FIFA nationality.

No.	Pos.	Nation	Player
1	GK	(Czech Republic) CZE	Filip Rada
2	DF	(Czech Republic) CZE	Michal Jeřábek
4	DF	(Czech Republic) CZE	Matěj Hanousek
5	MF	(Czech Republic) CZE	Marek Hanousek
6	DF	(Czech Republic) CZE	Jan Juroška
7	MF	(Slovakia) SVK	Jakub Považanec
8	MF	(Bosnia and Herzegovina) BIH	Aldin Čajić
9	DF	(Czech Republic) CZE	Jan Vorel
10	FW	(Spain) ESP	Néstor Albiach
11	FW	(Czech Republic) CZE	Michal Krmenčík (on loan from Viktoria Plzeň)
13	MF	(Czech Republic) CZE	Tomáš Berger
14	MF	(Czech Republic) CZE	Patrik Gedeon (captain)
15	DF	(Czech Republic) CZE	Tomáš Pospíšil

No.	Pos.	Nation	Player
17	FW	(France) FRA	Jean-David Beauguel
18	FW	(Czech Republic) CZE	Roman Polom (on loan from Sparta Prague)
19	DF	(Slovakia) SVK	Lukáš Štetina
21	FW	(Democratic Republic of the Congo) COD	Budge Manzia
22	DF	(Croatia) CRO	Dino Kluk
23	MF	(Slovakia) SVK	Róbert Kovaľ
26	FW	(Czech Republic) CZE	Jakub Mareš
27	DF	(Czech Republic) CZE	Dominik Preisler
29	GK	(Czech Republic) CZE	David Tetour
30	GK	(Slovakia) SVK	Martin Chudý
33	MF	(Slovakia) SVK	Marek Hlinka
39	DF	(Russia) RUS	Vyacheslav Karavayev (on loan from CSKA Moscow)

=== Transfers ===
French striker Jean-David Beauguel – who played the previous season in the Eredivisie - joined the club on a three-year contract after scoring four goals in a pre-season friendly.

Two midfielders joined Dukla, both signing three-year contracts with the club. These were Slovak Jakub Považanec, previously with Banská Bystrica, and Bosnian Aldin Čajić, who previously played for Teplice. Slovak goalkeeper Martin Chudý and Croatian defender Dino Kluk also joined the club.

Defenders Vyacheslav Karavayev (CSKA Moscow), Roman Polom (Sparta Prague) and forward Michal Krmenčík (Plzeň) all joined the club on season-long loans.

Last season's top goalscorer, striker Zbyněk Pospěch, left the club after two seasons and joined German side FC Energie Cottbus in the summer.

Two defenders left the club: Spaniard José Romera transferred to league rivals FK Jablonec after two years in Prague, while Croatian Tomislav Božić moved to Polish side Górnik Łęczna.

After a season with Dukla, midfielder Milan Černý left the club to play for former club Slavia Prague. Forward Josef Marek, defender Ľuboš Hanzel and goalkeeper Tomáš Kučera also left the club following the expiry of their contracts.

In the winter transfer window, the team's attacking options were strengthened with the loan signings of strikers Tomáš Přikryl (Sparta Prague), Jan Blažek (Liberec) and Nikolai Dergachyov (CSKA Moscow).

== Management and coaching staff ==
Position	Name
Manager	Luboš Kozel
Coach	Jan Suchopárek
Goalkeeping coach	Tomáš Obermajer
Fitness coach	Antonín Čepek
Team Leader	Petr Malý
Technical manager	Jiří Blažek
Club Physio	Pavel Hrásky
Masseur	Radek Havala, Jaroslav Šefl
Doctor	Ladislav Šindelář
Custodian	Jan Švestka

== Statistics ==
=== Goalscorers ===
Pos	Nat	Player	LIG	CUP	Total
1	(France)	Jean-David Beauguel	8	0	8
2	(Czech Republic)	Tomáš Berger	4	0	4
2	(Czech Republic)	Marek Hanousek	3	1	4
4	(Bosnia and Herzegovina)	Aldin Čajić	3	0	3
4	(Czech Republic)	Roman Polom	3	0	3
4	(Slovakia)	Jakub Považanec	3	0	3
7	(Czech Republic)	Jakub Mareš	2	0	2
7	(Czech Republic)	Tomáš Přikryl	2	0	2
7	(Czech Republic)	Michal Krmenčík	2	0	2
10	(Spain)	Néstor Albiach	1	0	1
Own goals			3	0	3
		Totals	34	1	35

=== Home attendance ===
Competition	Average Attendance	Games
Czech First League	2,516	15
Cup	0	0
Average	2,516	15

== Czech First League ==
Pos	Team	Pld	W	D	L	GF	GA	GD	Pts	Qualification or relegation
4	Mladá Boleslav	30	13	7	10	43	34	+9	46	Qualification for the Europa League second qualifying round
5	Příbram	30	12	7	11	40	45	−5	43	
6	Dukla Prague	30	11	8	11	34	40	−6	41	
7	Teplice	30	9	11	10	41	37	+4	38	
8	Bohemians 1905	30	10	8	12	35	41	−6	38	

Source: Fortuna liga
Rules for classification: 1) Points; 2) Head-to-head points; 3) Head-to-head goal difference; 4) Head-to-head goals scored; 5) Goal difference; 6) Goals scored; 7) Play-off (only if deciding champion, UEFA competitions, or relegation); 8) Draw.

=== Matches ===
25 July 2014 1	Dukla Prague	0–0	Baník Ostrava	Prague
20:15 CEST (UTC+2)		Report		Stadium: Stadion Juliska; Attendance: 2,425; Referee: Michal Paták

3 August 2014 2	Mladá Boleslav	0–1	Dukla Prague	Mladá Boleslav
17:00 CEST (UTC+2)	Beauguel 3'	Report		Stadium: Lokotrans Aréna; Attendance: 3,267; Referee: Pavel Královec

9 August 2014 3	Dukla Prague	1–1	Zbrojovka Brno	Prague
17:00 CEST (UTC+2)	Ma. Hanousek 7'	Report	Marković 18'	Stadium: Stadion Juliska; Attendance: 1,579; Referee: Ondřej Lerch

15 August 2014 4	Slovan Liberec	0–0	Dukla Prague	Liberec
18:00 CEST (UTC+2)		Report		Stadium: Stadion u Nisy; Attendance: 3,490; Referee: Pavel Orel

24 August 2014 5	Dukla Prague	1–0	Sparta Prague	Prague
20:15 CEST (UTC+2)	Berger 22'	Report		Stadium: Stadion Juliska; Attendance: 6,348; Referee: Libor Kovařik

31 August 2014 6	Viktoria Plzeň	2–1	Dukla Prague	Plzeň
17:00 CEST (UTC+2)	Vaněk 49'; Procházka 61'	Report	Beauguel 23'	Stadium: Doosan Arena; Attendance: 10,946; Referee: Michal Paták

13 September 2014 7	Dukla Prague	0–1	Bohemians 1905	Prague
17:00 CEST (UTC+2)		Report	Moravec 79'	Stadium: Stadion Juliska; Attendance: 4,786; Referee: Emanuel Marek

20 September 2014 8	Slovácko	5–1	Dukla Prague	Uherské Hradiště
17:00 CEST (UTC+2)	Došek 2', 5', 54'; Kerbr 22'; Kalouda 71'	Report	Beauguel 31'	Stadium: Městský fotbalový stadion Miroslava Valenty; Attendance: 4,056; Referee: Tomáš Kocourek

27 September 2014 9	Dukla Prague	4–1	Vysočina Jihlava	Prague
15:00 CEST (UTC+2)	Krejčí 13' (o.g.); Beauguel 36'; Krmenčík 46'; Považanec 71'	Report	Kovář 73'	Stadium: Stadion Juliska; Attendance: 1,201; Referee: Petr Ardeleánu

3 October 2014 10	Jablonec	6–0	Dukla Prague	Jablonec nad Nisou
20:15 CEST (UTC+2)	Doležal 8'; Mingazow 16'; Štetina 17' (o.g.); Novák 37', 77'; Rossi 57'	Report		Stadium: Stadion Střelnice; Attendance: 2,246; Referee: Ondřej Lerch

25 October 2014 12	Hradec Králové	2–4	Dukla Prague	Hradec Králové
17:00 CEST (UTC+2)	Halilović 5'; Dvořák 55'	Report	Čajić 37'; Beauguel 45', 85'; Považanec 74'	Stadium: Všesportovní stadion Attendance: 2,030; Referee: Ondřej Pechanec

28 October 2014 11	Dukla Prague	0–0	Příbram	Prague
20:15 CET (UTC+1)		Report		Stadium: Stadion Juliska; Attendance: 734; Referee: Karel Hrubeš

1 November 2014 13	Dukla Prague	3–1	České Budějovice	Prague
15:00 CET (UTC+1)	Beauguel 1'; Albiach 52'; Krmenčík 81'	Report	Lengyel 67'	Stadium: Stadion Juliska; Attendance: 823; Referee: Jiří Houdek

7 November 2014 14	Dukla Prague	2–2	Slavia Prague	Prague
20:15 CET (UTC+1)	Hanousek 25'; Považanec 35'	Report	Dobrotka 16'; Škoda 29'	Stadium: Stadion Juliska; Attendance: 6,080; Referee: Tomáš Kocourek

22 November 2014 15	Teplice	1–0	Dukla Prague	Teplice
17:00 CET (UTC+1)	Krob 54' (pen.)	Report		Stadium: Na Stínadlech; Attendance: 2,922; Referee: Pavel Královec

29 November 2014 16	Dukla Prague	0–2	Mladá Boleslav	Prague
17:00 CET (UTC+1)	Skalák 8'; Wágner 70'	Report		Stadium: Stadion Juliska; Attendance: 782; Referee: Pavel Orel

21 February 2015 17	Zbrojovka Brno	0–1	Dukla Prague	Brno
17:00 CET (UTC+1)		Report	Berger 65' (pen.)	Stadium: Městský fotbalový stadion Srbská; Attendance: 3,890; Referee: Karel Hrubeš

27 February 2015 18	Dukla Prague	3–1	Slovan Liberec	Prague
18:00 CET (UTC+1)	Polom 63'; Brabec 71' (o.g.); Mareš 85'	Report	Šural 50'	Stadium: Stadion Juliska; Attendance: 1,921; Referee: Martin Nenadál

8 March 2015 19	Sparta Prague	3–0	Dukla Prague	Prague
18:45 CET (UTC+1)	Štetina 18' (o.g.); Dočkal 45' (pen.); Krejčí 57'	Report		Stadium: Stadion Letná; Attendance: 8,631; Referee: Michal Paták

15 March 2015 20	Dukla Prague	2–3	Viktoria Plzeň	Prague
14:15 CET (UTC+1)	Hanousek 41'; Limberský 74' (pen.)	Report	Kovařík 51'; Kolář 72' (pen.), 89' (pen.)	Stadium: Stadion Juliska; Attendance: 5,083; Referee: Jan Jílek

22 March 2015 21	Bohemians 1905	0–0	Dukla Prague	Prague
18:00 CET (UTC+1)		Report		Stadium: Ďolíček; Attendance: 4,211; Referee: Emanuel Marek

4 April 2015 22	Dukla Prague	0–0	Slovácko	Prague
17:00 CEST (UTC+2)		Report		Stadium: Stadion Juliska; Attendance: 924; Referee: Pavel Franěk

11 April 2015 23	Vysočina Jihlava	1–2	Dukla Prague	Jihlava
16:00 CEST (UTC+2)	Jánoš 13'	Report	Polom 41'; Čajić 53'	Stadium: Stadion v Jiráskově ulici Attendance: 3,390; Referee: Zbyněk Proske

18 April 2015 24	Dukla Prague	1–0	Jablonec	Prague
17:00 CEST (UTC+2)	Berger 12'	Report		Stadium: Stadion Juliska; Attendance: 1,898; Referee: Radek Příhoda

25 April 2015 25	Příbram	3–0	Dukla Prague	Příbram
17:00 CEST (UTC+2)	Moulis 5'; Hnaníček 10'; Zeman 73'	Report		Stadium: Na Litavce; Attendance: 2,016; Referee: Ondřej Lerch

2 May 2015 26	Dukla Prague	1–0	Hradec Králové	Prague
15:00 CEST (UTC+2)	Beauguel 10'	Report		Stadium: Stadion Juliska; Attendance: 1,538; Referee: Martin Nenadál

9 May 2015 27	České Budějovice	1–0	Dukla Prague	České Budějovice
16:00 CEST (UTC+2)	Funda 15'	Report		Stadium: Stadion Střelecký ostrov Attendance: 1,174; Referee: Jiří Houdek

17 May 2015 28	Slavia Prague	2–0	Dukla Prague	Prague
18:00 CEST (UTC+2)	Kenia 36'; Červenka 89'	Report		Stadium: Fortuna Arena; Attendance: 3,331; Referee: Radek Příhoda

23 May 2015 29	Dukla Prague	5–1	Teplice	Prague
17:15 CEST (UTC+2)	Polom 40'; Berger 45'; Přikryl 59', 67'; Čajić 66'	Report	Kapolongo 14'	Stadium: Stadion Juliska; Attendance: 1,622; Referee: Pavel Orel

30 May 2015 30	Baník Ostrava	1–1	Dukla Prague	Ostrava
17:15 CEST (UTC+2)	Kukec 2'	Report	Mareš 80'	Stadium: Bazaly; Attendance: 10,340; Referee: Petr Ardeleánu

== Cup ==
As a First League team, Dukla entered the Cup at the second round stage. In the second round, Dukla faced third league side Domažlice. The first half finished goalless, but a penalty put the home side ahead just before the hour mark. Two further goals followed for the home team; Marek Hanousek's injury time goal made no difference to the result as the First League side succumbed to a 3–1 defeat and elimination in their first game of the season's competition.

20 August 2013 Second Round	TJ Jiskra Domažlice	3 – 1	Dukla Prague	Domažlice
	Mužík 58' (pen.); Braun 69'; Došlý 88'	Report	90+1' Marek Hanousek	Referee: Váňa
