= 2017 Tipsport liga =

Tournament details
- Country: Czech Republic
- Dates: 7 January – 29 January
- Teams: 16

Final positions
- Champions: FK Mladá Boleslav
- Runners-up: FK Pardubice

Tournament statistics
- Matches played: 28
- Goals scored: 107 (3.82 per match)
- Top goal scorer: Adam Fousek (FK Pardubice) (4 goals)

2017 Tipsport liga is the nineteenth edition of annual football tournament in Czech Republic.

== Groups ==
=== Group A ===
Team	Pld	W	D	L	GF	GA	GD	Pts
Bohemians 1905	3	3	0	0	11	2	+9	9
FC Hradec Králové	3	2	0	1	5	4	+1	6
FC MAS Táborsko	3	1	0	2	4	5	−1	3
1. FK Příbram	3	0	0	3	1	10	−9	0

7 January 2017
12:00

Bohemians 1905	3–0	FC Hradec Králové
Dostál 32'; Kabayev 39'; Blecha 65'	Report	Martan (yellow card) 77'

Stadion Slavoj Vyšehrad, Vyšehrad
10 January 2017
12:00

1. FK Příbram	0–2	FC MAS Táborsko
		Kočí 57'; Gebert 83'

Stadion Slavoj Vyšehrad, Vyšehrad
14 January 2017
12:00

1. FK Příbram	1–3	FC Hradec Králové
Pilík 21'		Shejbal 8'; Schwarz 55', 88'

Stadion Slavoj Vyšehrad, Vyšehrad
17 January 2017
14:00

FC MAS Táborsko	2–3	Bohemians 1905
Toml 2'; Dzafic 4'		Mršić 11' (o.g.); Kuchta 59'; Luts 82'

Stadion Slavoj Vyšehrad, Vyšehrad
21 January 2017
12:00

Bohemians 1905	5–0	1. FK Příbram
Hašek 20', 23'; Kuchta 38' (pen.); Čížek 64'; Mašek 77' (pen.)

Stadion Slavoj Vyšehrad, Vyšehrad
21 January 2017
14:00

FC Hradec Králové	2–0	FC MAS Táborsko
Šípek 34'; Pázler 75'

Stadion Slavoj Vyšehrad, Vyšehrad

=== Group B ===
Team	Pld	W	D	L	GF	GA	GD	Pts
FK Mladá Boleslav	3	2	1	0	8	2	+6	7
FK Jablonec	3	1	2	0	7	3	+4	5
FC Slovan Liberec	3	1	0	2	6	10	−4	3
FK Varnsdorf	3	0	1	2	4	10	−6	1

11 January 2017
12:00

FK Jablonec	2–2	FK Varnsdorf
Mihálik 31'; Diviš 48'	Report	Neuberg 2'; Fotr 42'

Městský stadion, Mladá Boleslav
15 January 2017
12:00

FK Mladá Boleslav	4–1	FC Slovan Liberec
Chramosta 8'; Nečas 13'; Přikryl 48'; Fabián 84'		Karafiát 66'

Městský stadion, Mladá Boleslav
18 January 2017
12:00

FC Slovan Liberec	5–2	FK Varnsdorf
Baroš 12', 19'; Ševčík 17'; Micovčák 57'; Kubyshkin 70'		Štěpánek 40'; Fotr 73'

Městský stadion, Mladá Boleslav
21 January 2017
14:00

FK Jablonec	4–0	FC Slovan Liberec
Diviš 4', 31'; Mihálik 82'; Tecl 84'

Městský stadion, Mladá Boleslav
22 January 2017
12:00

FK Varnsdorf	0–3	FK Mladá Boleslav
		Vukadinović 64', 87'; Nečas 85'

Městský stadion, Mladá Boleslav
25 January 2017
12:00

FK Varnsdorf	1–1	FK Jablonec
Chramosta 52'		Zelený 29'

Městský stadion, Mladá Boleslav

=== Group C ===
Team	Pld	W	D	L	GF	GA	GD	Pts
FK Pardubice	3	2	1	0	8	2	+6	7
MFK Skalica	3	1	2	0	7	4	+3	5
FC Zbrojovka Brno	3	1	1	1	9	9	0	4
1. SC Znojmo	3	0	0	3	2	10	−8	0

7 January 2017
14:00

FK Pardubice	5–0	FC Zbrojovka Brno
Fousek 9'; Kayamba 11'; Jeřábek 42'; Petráň 52'; Floder 56'	Report

Městský fotbalový stadion Srbská, Brno
18 January 2017
12:00

MFK Skalica	1–1	FK Pardubice
Ulrich 56'		Vodháněl 54'

Městský fotbalový stadion Srbská, Brno
18 January 2017
14:00

FC Zbrojovka Brno	5–1	1. SC Znojmo
Litsingi 14', 39'; Krejčí 27'; Škoda 45' (pen.); Přichystal 57'		Klíma 34'

Městský fotbalový stadion Srbská, Brno
21 January 2017
12:00

FC Zbrojovka Brno	3–3	1. SC Znojmo
Řezníček 7'; Škoda 31'; Litsingi 63'		Szőcs 16'; Šebesta 47' (pen.); Milunović 81' (pen.)

Městský fotbalový stadion Srbská, Brno
21 January 2017
14:00

1. SC Znojmo	1–2	FK Pardubice
Teplý 78'		Kayamba 8'; Kovář 87'

Městský fotbalový stadion Srbská, Brno
25 January 2017
12:00

MFK Skalica	3–0	1. SC Znojmo
? 12'; Ulrich 23' (pen.); Šebesta 69'

Městský fotbalový stadion Srbská, Brno

=== Group D ===
Team	Pld	W	D	L	GF	GA	GD	Pts
FK Poprad	3	3	0	0	8	4	+4	9
MFK Vítkovice	3	2	0	1	8	6	+2	6
Podbeskidzie Bielsko-Biała	3	1	0	2	7	7	0	3
MFK Frýdek-Místek	3	0	0	3	2	8	−6	0

7 January 2017
14:00

MFK Vítkovice	2–4	FK Poprad
Vaněk 21' (pen.); Malý 67'	Report	Hric 14'; Kapláň 31'; Šuľa 50'; Lukáč 84'

Stadion Stovky, Frýdek-Místek
11 January 2017
12:00

MFK Vítkovice	4–2	Podbeskidzie Bielsko-Biała
Kovařík 14'; Demjan 24' (o.g.); Fiala 76'; Szotkowski 78'	Report	Janota 41' (pen.), 43' (pen.)

Stadion Stovky, Frýdek-Místek
18 January 2017
14:00

MFK Frýdek-Místek	0–2	MFK Vítkovice
		Pavelka 48'; Szotkowski 60'

Stadion Stovky, Frýdek-Místek
20 January 2017
14:00

FK Poprad	2–1	Podbeskidzie Bielsko-Biała
Bilas 2', 20'		Demjan 35'

Stadion Stovky, Frýdek-Místek
21 January 2017
14:00

MFK Frýdek-Místek	1–2	FK Poprad
Đurić 62'		Maťaš 25'; Šašinka 34'

Stadion Stovky, Frýdek-Místek
26 January 2017
13:45

Podbeskidzie Bielsko-Biała	4–1	MFK Frýdek-Místek
Kolár 6'; Sládek 26'; Podgórski 79' (pen.); Lewicki 88'		Kinkembo 73'

Stadion Stovky, Frýdek-Místek

== Semifinals ==
28 January 2017
12:00

Bohemians 1905	0–2	FK Mladá Boleslav
Vukadinović 30'; Fleišman 38'

28 January 2017
14:30

FK Pardubice	2–1	FK Poprad
Kayamba 58'; Fousek 62'		Bilas 84' (pen.)

== Third place ==
29 January 2017
12:00

Bohemians 1905	2–0	FK Poprad
Šula 5' (o.g.); Havel 12'

== Final ==
29 January 2017
12:00

FK Mladá Boleslav	4–0	FK Pardubice
Mareš 10'; Železník 22'; Chramosta 55'; Nečas 85'
