= Rybička =

Rybička may refer to:

- Rybička (knife), a Czech pocket knife
- Petr Rybička (born 1996), Czech footballer

== See also ==
- Rybicki
