= Rybicki =

Ślepowron coat of arms used by some of Rybicki family

Rybicki (Polish pronunciation: [rɨˈbit͡ski]; feminine: Rybicka) is a Polish surname. Some of them use Ślepowron coat of arms or Pogoń Litewska coat of arms. Notable people with the surname include:

- Anna Rybicka (born 1977), Polish fencer
- Arkadiusz Rybicki (1953–2010), Polish politician
- Camilla Rybicka
- Chris Rybicki (1971–2010), American metalcore band Unearth bassist
- Franz Rybicki (1924–2014), Austrian football manager
- Henryk Rybicki (1922–1978), Polish footballer who played as a goalkeeper
- Irv Rybicki (1921–2001), American automotive designer
- Jacek Rybicki (1959–2024), Polish trade unionist and politician
- James Rybicki, American intelligence official
- Jerzy Rybicki (born 1953), Polish boxer
- Kamil Rybicki (born 1996), Polish wrestler
- Mariusz Rybicki (born 1993), Polish footballer
- Natalia Rybicka (born 1986), Polish actress
- Petr Rybička (born 1996), Czech football player
- Robert Rybicki (born 1976), Polish poet
- Sławomir Rybicki (born 1960), Polish politician
- Wojciech Rybicki (born 1942), Polish composer
