= Pazdera =

Pazdera (feminine: Pazderová) is a Czech surname. Notable people with the surname include:

- Arnošt Pazdera (1929–2021), Czech footballer
- Ladislav Pazdera (1936–2022), Czech gymnast
- Lukáš Pazdera (born 1987), Czech footballer
- Martin Pazdera (born 1976), Czech footballer
- Michaela Pazderová (born 1963), Czech tennis player
