= Na Chvalech =

Football stadium in the Czech Republic

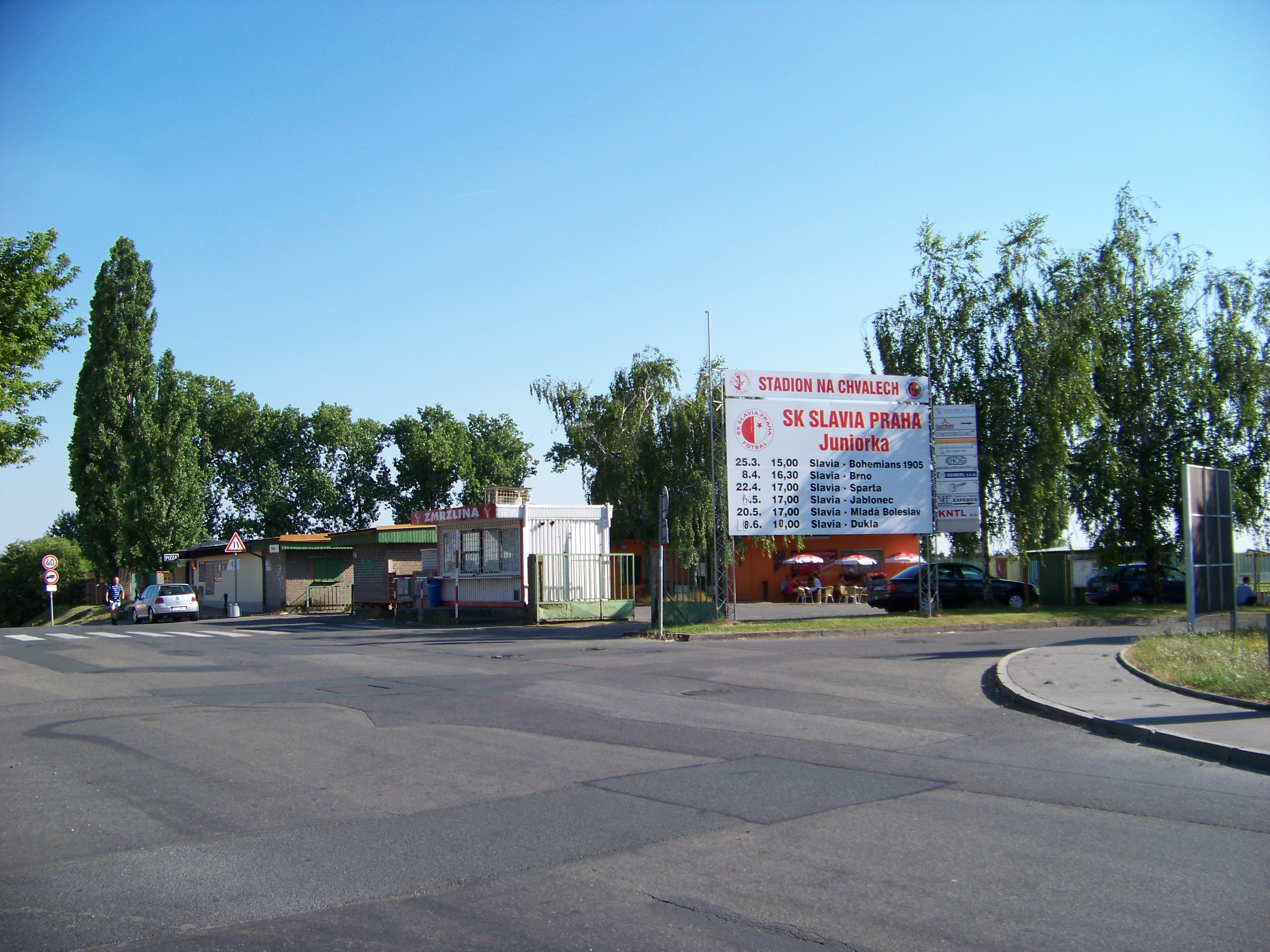
- Interactive map of Na Chvalech
- Location: Božanovská 2098, Prague 9 - Horní Počernice, Czech Republic, 193 00
- Coordinates: 50°06′35″N 14°35′57″E
- Owner: SK Slavia Prague
- Capacity: 3,400
- Surface: Grass
- Field size: 105m x 68m

Tenants
- SC Xaverov; Slavia Prague B Slavia Prague (women)

Stadion Na Chvalech (Stadium on the Chvaly), also known as Stadion SC Xaverov Horní Počernice, is a football stadium in Chvaly, a former village which is a part of Horní Počernice district of Prague, Czech Republic. The stadium holds 3,400 spectators and contains a restaurant. The sports area Na Chvalech also contains a volleyball court, tennis courts, a hotel and offices.

It is the home stadium of SC Xaverov and was being shared with AC Sparta Prague B in 2010. From 2013 up to today, it is shared with SK Slavia Prague B.

In 2010, the stadium hosted a qualification match for the 2011 FIFA Women's World Cup.
