= 2018 Tipsport liga =

Tournament details
- Country: Czech Republic
- Dates: 6 January – 28 January
- Teams: 16

Final positions
- Champions: Zbrojovka Brno
- Runner-up: Bohemians 1905

Tournament statistics
- Matches played: 28
- Goals scored: 109 (3.89 per match)
- Top goal scorer(s): Petr Schwarz (Hradec Králové); Nicolas Šumský (Frýdek-Místek) (4 goals each)

2018 Tipsport liga is the twenty-first edition of the annual football tournament in Czech Republic.

== Groups ==
=== Group A ===
- All matches will be played in Vyšehrad.

Team	Pld	W	D	L	GF	GA	GD	Pts
Bohemians 1905	3	3	0	0	7	1	+6	9
FK Varnsdorf	3	2	0	1	9	5	+4	6
FC MAS Táborsko	3	1	0	2	4	9	−5	3
FK Olympia Prague	3	0	0	3	1	6	−5	0

=== Group B ===
- All matches will be played in Xaverov.

Team	Pld	W	D	L	GF	GA	GD	Pts
FC Hradec Králové	3	2	1	0	10	2	+8	7
FC Vysočina Jihlava	3	1	1	1	7	5	+2	4
FK Jablonec	3	1	1	1	3	5	−2	4
FC Slovan Liberec	3	0	1	2	2	10	−8	1

=== Group C ===
- All matches will be played in Brno.

Team	Pld	W	D	L	GF	GA	GD	Pts
FC Zbrojovka Brno	3	3	0	0	5	1	+4	9
(Slovakia) MFK Skalica	3	2	0	1	4	2	+2	6
1. SC Znojmo	3	1	0	2	3	4	−1	3
FK Pardubice	3	0	0	3	2	7	−5	0

=== Group D ===
- All matches will be played in Frýdek-Místek.

Team	Pld	W	D	L	GF	GA	GD	Pts
MFK Frýdek-Místek	3	3	0	0	11	2	+9	9
(Slovakia) FK Poprad	3	2	0	1	12	6	+6	6
1. SK Prostějov	3	1	0	2	8	10	−2	3
TJ Valašské Meziříčí	3	0	0	3	6	19	−13	0

== Semifinals ==
24 January 2018
12:00

Bohemians 1905	2–1	Hradec Králové
Benjamin Tetteh 26'; Michal Šmíd 77'		René Kropáček 83'

Frýdek-Místek
24 January 2018
14:00

Zbrojovka Brno	4–2	Frýdek-Místek
Tomáš Pilík 28' (pen.); Daniel Bialek 39' (o.g.); Miloš Kratochvíl 45'; Musefiu Ashiru 75'		Nicolas Šumský 54'; Martin Honiš 90'

Frýdek-Místek

== Third place ==
25 January 2018
12:00

Hradec Králové	3–1	Frýdek-Místek
Jiří Miker 7'; Igor Súkenník 24'; Marek Plašil 90'		Martin Macej 89'

Frýdek-Místek

== Final ==
25 January 2018
14:30

Bohemians 1905	0–2	Zbrojovka Brno
		Miloš Kratochvíl 70'; Lukáš Vraštil 88'

Frýdek-Místek
