= Tipsport liga (football) =

- Founded: 1998; 28 years ago
- Region: Czech Republic
- Teams: 16
- Current champions: MFK Chrudim (1st title)
- Most championships: FK Mladá Boleslav (4 titles)
- Website: http://www.tipsport-liga.cz
- 2025 Tipsport liga

Tipsport liga is an annual winter football tournament for clubs from the Czech Republic and occasionally surrounding countries. MFK Chrudim are the current champions. The tournament was known as Tipsport Cup from 1998 to 2007.

== Results by year ==
Year	Winners
1998	Bohemians 1905
1999	SK Slavia Prague
2000	FC Viktoria Plzeň
2001	FC Slovan Liberec
2002	FK Jablonec
2003	SC Xaverov Horní Počernice
2004	SK Slavia Prague
2005	FK Mladá Boleslav
2006	FK Teplice
2007	1. FC Slovácko
2008	1. FK Příbram
2009	FC Zbrojovka Brno
2010	MŠK Žilina
2011	SK Sigma Olomouc
2012	FC Vysočina Jihlava
2013	SK Slavia Prague
2014	Bohemians 1905
2015	FC Hradec Králové
2016	FC Fastav Zlín
2017	FK Mladá Boleslav
2018	FC Zbrojovka Brno
2019	Baník Ostrava
2020	FK Mladá Boleslav
2021	FC Spartak Trnava
2022	FK Mladá Boleslav
2023	Bohemians 1905
2024	MFK Chrudim
2025	
2026	
