= David Čapek =

Czech footballer

Personal information
- Full name: David Čapek
- Date of birth: 7 May 1997 (age 29)
- Place of birth: Czech Republic
- Position: Forward

Team information
- Current team: Dach Raab
- Number: 10

Youth career
- Sparta Prague

Senior career*
Years	Team	Apps	(Gls)
2016–2020	Sparta Prague	1	(0)
2016	→ Vlašim (loan)	2	(0)
2018	→ Ružomberok (loan)	11	(0)
2018–2019	→ Vyšehrad (loan)	32	(14)
2019–2020	→ Viktoria Žižkov (loan)	11	(3)
2020–2022	Silon Táborsko	31	(3)
2022	SC St. Martin	12	(14)
2023	USV Oed/Zeillern	13	(9)
2023–	Dach Raab	6	(3)

International career
2016	Czech Republic U-20	1	(0)
- * Club domestic league appearances and goals as of 18:19, 24 September 2023 (UTC)

David Čapek (born 7 May 1997) is a Czech footballer who currently plays for Austrian side Dach Raab as a forward.

== Club career ==
=== AC Sparta Prague ===
Čapek made his professional debut for Sparta Prague on 10 April 2016 against Příbram.
