= Antonín Fantiš =

Czech footballer

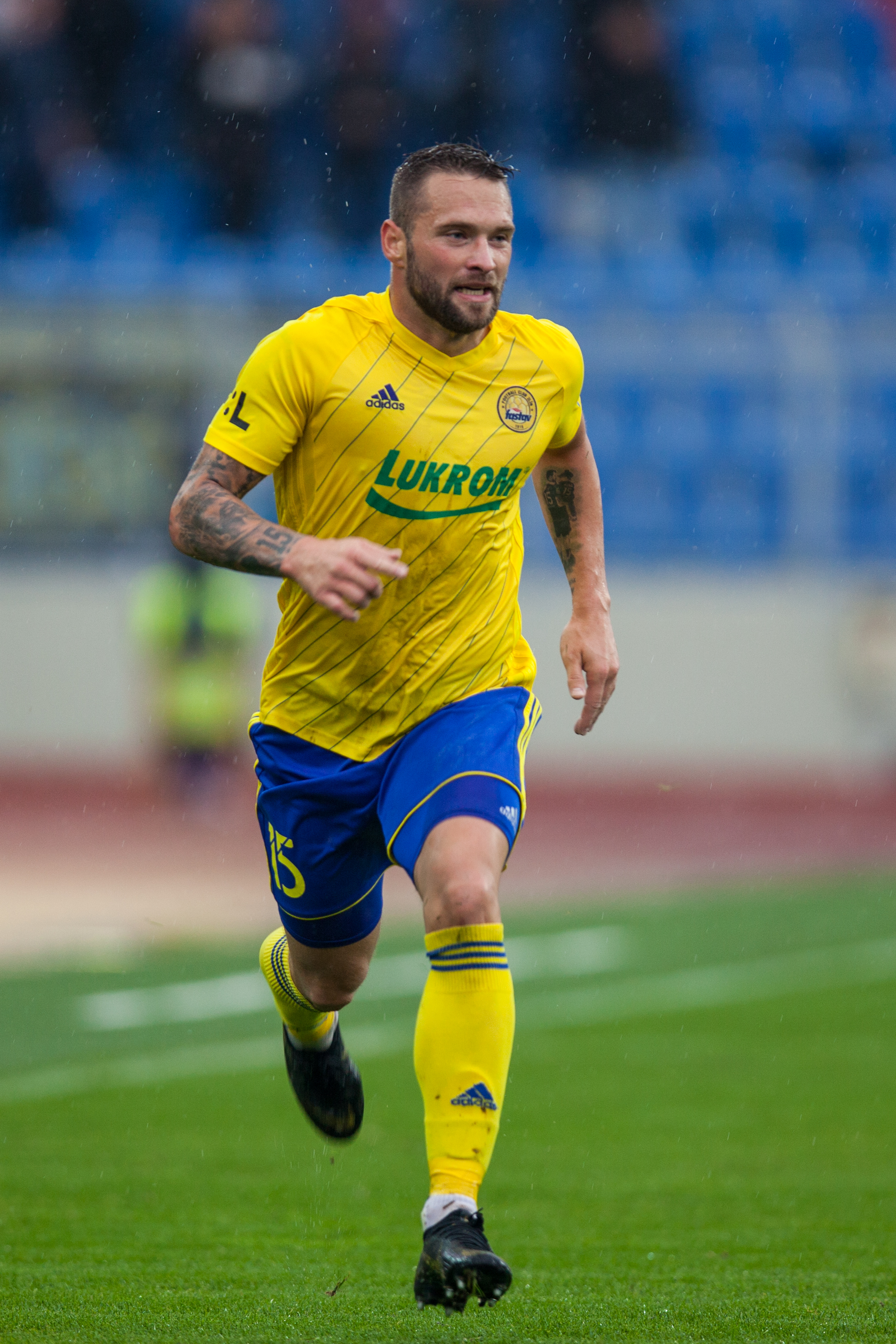

Personal information
- Full name: Antonín Fantiš
- Date of birth: 15 April 1992 (age 34)
- Place of birth: Prague, Czechoslovakia
- Height: 1.75 m (5 ft 9 in)
- Position: Winger

Team information
- Current team: Ústí nad Labem
- Number: 77

Youth career
- 1997–2000: Bohemians Prague
- 2000–2008: Příbram

Senior career*
Years	Team	Apps	(Gls)
2008–2010	Příbram	43	(2)
2010–2013	Baník Ostrava	81	(10)
2014–2015	Jablonec	14	(0)
2015	→ Fastav Zlín (loan)	0	(0)
2016–2018	Fastav Zlín	33	(0)
2017–2018	→ Příbram (loan)	23	(5)
2018–2019	Příbram	31	(7)
2019–2024	FC Zlín	134	(10)
2024	Voluntari	10	(0)
2025–	Ústí nad Labem	43	(8)

International career
2007–2008	Czech Republic U16	12	(3)
2008–2009	Czech Republic U17	12	(5)
2010–2011	Czech Republic U19	13	(1)
2009	Czech Republic U20	1	(0)
2012–2014	Czech Republic U21	7	(0)
Medal record
Men's football
Representing Czech Republic
UEFA European Under-19 Championship
Runner-up	2011 Romania
- * Club domestic league appearances and goals as of 28 May 2026

Antonín Fantiš (born 15 April 1992) is a Czech professional footballer who plays as a winger for Ústí nad Labem.

== Honours ==
Jablonec

- Czech Cup runner-up: 2014–15

Fastav Zlín

- Czech Cup: 2016–17

Czech Republic U19

- UEFA European Under-19 Championship runner-up: 2011
