= Sunday Faleye =

Nigerian footballer (born 1998)

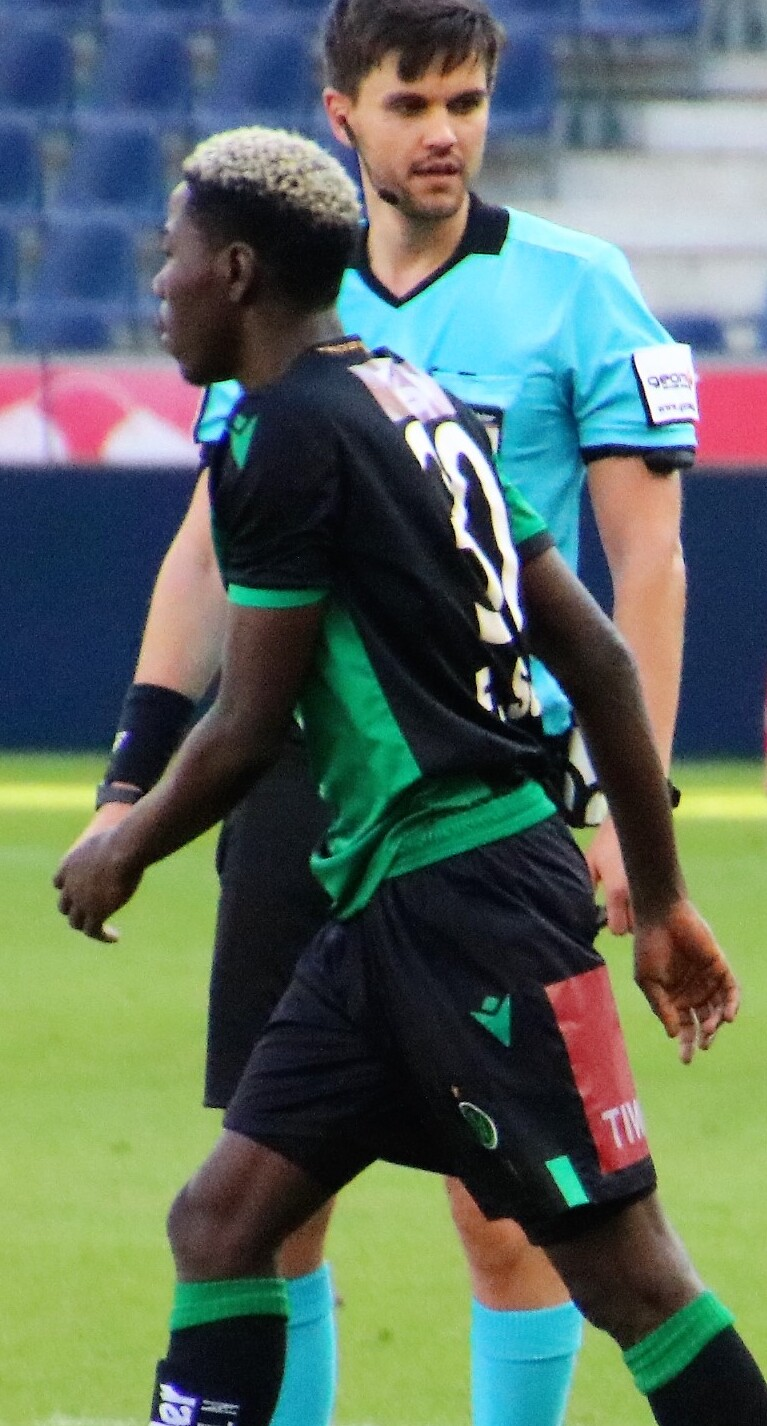
- Faleye in 2019

Personal information
- Full name: Sunday Adeyemi Faleye
- Date of birth: 29 November 1998 (age 27)
- Place of birth: Lagos, Nigeria
- Height: 1.71 m (5 ft 7 in)
- Position: Forward

Team information
- Current team: Lynx
- Number: 10

Senior career*
Years	Team	Apps	(Gls)
2017–2018	Shooting Stars		
2018–2019	Akwa United		
2019	SCR Altach II	11	(3)
2019–2021	Wacker Innsbruck II	6	(1)
2019–2021	Wacker Innsbruck	29	(4)
2021–2022	Dukla Prague	24	(5)
2022	→ Shooting Stars (loan)	9	(1)
2023	Torpedo Kutaisi	15	(0)
2023–2024	Samtredia		
2025–2026	Lynx	15	(7)
2026	Vysočina Jihlava	3	(0)
2026–	Lynx	8	(1)

International career^{‡}
2018–2022	Nigeria	5	(1)
- * Club domestic league appearances and goals as of 16:49, 22 November 2026 (UTC) ‡ National team caps and goals as of 16:48, 21 December 2023 (UTC)

Sunday Adeyemi Faleye (born 29 November 1998) is a Nigerian professional footballer who plays as a forward for Lynx and the Nigeria national team.

== Club career ==
He has played club football for Shooting Stars and Akwa United. After playing in Austria for SCR Altach II and Wacker Innsbruck, he signed for Czech club Dukla Prague in January 2021.

He returned to Shooting Stars in February 2022, signing a loan contract.

He joined Lynx in summer 2025 and scored four minutes into his debut, a 3–2 win over Glacis United. After a brief spell in the Czech Republic with Vysočina Jihlava, he returned to Lynx in summer 2026. However, he was sent off on his second debut in a 2–0 defeat to F.C. Magpies.

== International career ==
He made his international debut for Nigeria in 2018.
