= Aldin Čajić =

Bosnian footballer (born 1992)

Personal information
- Date of birth: 11 September 1992 (age 34)
- Place of birth: Konjic, Bosnia and Herzegovina
- Height: 1.82 m (6 ft 0 in)
- Position: Midfielder

Youth career
- Radnik Hadžići
- 2007–2010: Sparta Prague

Senior career*
Years	Team	Apps	(Gls)
2010–2014	Teplice	54	(2)
2014–2017	Dukla Prague	67	(6)
2017	Elazığspor	16	(5)
2017–2023	İstanbulspor	116	(25)
2020–2021	→ Tuzlaspor (loan)	27	(1)
2023	Kapaz	0	(0)
2023–2024	GOŠK Gabela	22	(1)
2024–2025	Sloboda Tuzla	12	(0)

International career
2008	Bosnia and Herzegovina U17	3	(0)
2012–2013	Bosnia and Herzegovina U21	9	(2)
- * Club domestic league appearances and goals as of 4 December 2024

Aldin Čajić (Bosnian pronunciation: [âldiːn tʃâːjitɕ]; born 11 September 1992) is a Bosnian professional footballer who plays as a midfielder.

Čajić started his professional career at Teplice, before joining Dukla Prague in 2014. Three years later, he moved to Elazığspor. Later that year, he signed with İstanbulspor.

== Club career ==
=== Early career ===
Čajić came through Sparta Prague's youth academy, which he joined in 2007 from a local club.

In July 2010, he moved to Teplice. He made his professional debut against Brno on 12 September at the age of 18. On 2 May 2011, he scored his first professional goal.

In May 2014, Čajić joined Dukla Prague.

In January 2017, he was transferred to Turkish side Elazığspor. On 14 May, he scored his first career hat-trick against Balıkesirspor.

In July 2017, Čajić signed with İstanbulspor. He helped İstanbulspor achieve promotion in the 2021–22 season for the first time in 17 years. He started in İstanbulspor return to the Süper Lig in a 2–0 season opening loss to Trabzonspor on 5 August 2022.

== International career ==
Čajić represented Bosnia and Herzegovina on various youth levels.

== Career statistics ==
=== Club ===
As of match played 8 October 2022

Appearances and goals by club, season and competition
Club	Season	League			Cup		Continental		Total	
Club	Season	Division	Apps	Goals	Apps	Goals	Apps	Goals	Apps	Goals
Teplice	2010–11	Czech First League	20	1	3	0	–		23	1
Teplice	2011–12	Czech First League	22	1	5	0	–		27	1
Teplice	2012–13	Czech First League	10	0	3	0	–		13	0
Teplice	2013–14	Czech First League	2	0	0	0	–		2	0
Teplice	Total		54	2	11	0	–		65	2
Dukla Prague	2014–15	Czech First League	26	3	1	0	–		27	3
Dukla Prague	2015–16	Czech First League	25	2	4	0	–		29	2
Dukla Prague	2016–17	Czech First League	16	1	3	0	–		19	1
Dukla Prague	Total		67	6	8	0	–		75	6
Elazığspor	2016–17	1. Lig	16	5	1	0	–		17	5
İstanbulspor	2017–18	1. Lig	28	7	5	2	–		33	9
İstanbulspor	2018–19	1. Lig	33	6	1	0	–		34	6
İstanbulspor	2019–20	1. Lig	29	9	1	0	–		30	9
İstanbulspor	2020–21	1. Lig	2	0	0	0	–		2	0
İstanbulspor	2021–22	1. Lig	16	3	1	0	–		17	3
İstanbulspor	2022–23	Süper Lig	4	0	0	0	–		4	0
İstanbulspor	Total		112	25	8	2	–		120	27
Tuzlaspor (loan)	2020–21	1. Lig	27	1	3	0	–		30	1
Career total			276	37	31	2	–		307	39
