= Adam Ševčík =

Czech footballer

Personal information
- Date of birth: 24 January 1993 (age 33)
- Place of birth: Olomouc, Czech Republic
- Height: 1.86 m (6 ft 1 in)
- Position: Forward

Youth career
- 2006–2012: Sigma Olomouc

Senior career*
Years	Team	Apps	(Gls)
2012–2017	Sigma Olomouc	1	(0)
2013	→ Znojmo (loan)	7	(0)
2013	→ Nitra (loan)	13	(2)
2014	→ Hanácká Slavia Kroměříž (loan)		
2015	→ Hanácká Slavia Kroměříž (loan)		
2017	→ Frýdek-Místek (loan)	13	(3)
2017–2019	Baník Sokolov	26	(4)
2019	→ Prostějov (loan)	9	(1)
2019–2020	Bayern Hof	19	(3)

International career
2012	Czech Republic U19	1	(0)
- * Club domestic league appearances and goals as of 26 January 2021

Adam Ševčík (born 24 January 1993) is a Czech footballer who last played as a forward for Bayern Hof.

== Youth career ==
=== Sigma Olomouc ===
Ševčík started his career with Sigma Olomouc. Ševčík was part of the squad of players born in 1993 that managed to win the U-17 as well as the U-19 Czech National Youth league. Adam Ševčík belonged to the key members of this victorious squad, scoring many important goals upon winning the titles.

== Club career ==
=== Sigma Olomouc ===
Ševčík made his debut for Sigma Olomouc in a friendly match on 12 July 2014, coming on as a substitute in the 64th minute in a 2–1 victory against the IFA international football team.

=== Loan to 1. SC Znojmo ===
On 30 January 2013 Ševčík was loaned out to Znojmo. At the age of 19 Adam Ševčík made persuasive performances, contributing to Znojmo's promotion to the Czech First League.

=== Loan to FC Nitra ===
On 1 July 2013 Ševčík was loaned out to Nitra playing the Slovak top division. Ševčík made his Corgoň Liga debut in a 4:0 loss against AS Trenčín. Ševčík went on to play 7 matches during his loan spell in Slovakia.

=== Loan to SK Hanácká Slavia Kroměříž ===
In August 2014, Ševčík was sent on loan to Hanácká Slavia Kroměříž for the fall part of the 2014/2015 season.

== International career ==
=== Czech Republic U19 ===
On 17 April 2012 Ševčík was called up for U-19 Czech National team. He made his debut in a 0:0 draw against Germany.
