= Bronislav Stáňa =

Czech footballer

Personal information
- Full name: Bronislav Stáňa
- Date of birth: 12 November 1993 (age 32)
- Place of birth: Znojmo, Czech Republic
- Height: 1.75 m (5 ft 9 in)
- Position: Right midfielder

Youth career
- 2005–2010: Znojmo
- 2010–2013: Zbrojovka Brno

Senior career*
Years	Team	Apps	(Gls)
2013–2016	Znojmo	53	(3)
2016–2019	Ostrava	45	(4)
2019–2021	SFC Opava	20	(2)
2020	→ Prostějov (loan)	11	(1)
2020–2021	→ Fotbal Třinec (loan)	18	(3)
2021–2022	Líšeň	11	(1)
- * Club domestic league appearances and goals

Bronislav Stáňa (born 12 November 1993) is a retired Czech football midfielder.

== Career ==
He joined Baník Ostrava, who were newly relegated to Czech National Football League, from Znojmo in June 2016. He helped his team gain promotion back into the Czech First League after just one year in the second-tier competition. He scored his first top flight goal in his first Czech First League appearance for Baník Ostrava.

On 2 January 2019, SFC Opava announced the signing of Stáňa. On 23 February 2020, Stáňa joined 1. SK Prostějov on loan for the rest of the season. He ended the loan spell with 11 games and one goals, before joining FK Fotbal Třinec on 19 August 2020 on a year-long loan deal.
