= Michal Malý =

Czech footballer

Personal information
- Date of birth: 29 May 1987 (age 39)
- Place of birth: Czechoslovakia
- Height: 1.83 m (6 ft 0 in)
- Position: Defender

Team information
- Current team: FC Tescoma Zlín
- Number: 2

Senior career*
Years	Team	Apps	(Gls)
2008–	FC Tescoma Zlín	46	(0)
- * Club domestic league appearances and goals as of 19 November 2011

Michal Malý (born 29 May 1987) is a Czech football player, who currently plays for FC Tescoma Zlín as a defender. He made his Gambrinus liga debut for Zlín against Mladá Boleslav on 10 August 2008.
