= Richard Vaněk =

Czech footballer

Personal information
- Date of birth: 11 June 1991 (age 35)
- Place of birth: Czechoslovakia
- Height: 1.79 m (5 ft 10 in)
- Position: Midfielder

Team information
- Current team: Fotbal Třinec
- Number: 6

Youth career
- 1997–2011: FC Baník Ostrava

Senior career*
Years	Team	Apps	(Gls)
2011–2012	FC Baník Ostrava	2	(0)
2012–2016	MFK Karviná	61	(2)
2015	→ MFK Frýdek-Místek (loan)	13	(1)
2016–2017	MFK Vítkovice	28	(1)
2017–	Fotbal Třinec	6	(0)
- * Club domestic league appearances and goals as of 31 December 2011

Richard Vaněk (born 11 June 1991) is a professional Czech football player who currently plays for Fotbal Třinec.
