= Wojciech Rybicki =

- Origin: Włocławek, Poland
- Genres: Classical music
- Occupations: Composer, pianist, chemistry engineer
- Years active: late 1950–present

Wojciech Rybicki (born in 1942) in Tomaszów Lubelski. He comes from Sanok. In 1959 he graduated from high school in Sanok and piano class at the State Primary Music School. During high school he performed as a pianist in a jazz band. He graduated from the Faculty of Chemistry at the Maria Curie-Skłodowska University in Lublin (1966). He also completed postgraduate studies at Warsaw University of Technology (1988). While studying at MCSU he continued his musical education in piano at the Music High School in Lublin.

As a chemist he worked between 1966 -2003 in chemical factory: in Puławy and since 1971 in Włocławek (Anwil SA company), where he lives with his wife Barbara - a chemical engineer. His children, Elizabeth and Jacek, M.Sc. in computer science carry out his professional career in Warsaw. For his work in the Chemical Industry he was awarded state awards - the Golden Cross of Merit and the Bronze Cross of Merit and a silver badge of Merit for the Chemical Industry.

Since 1999 he composes classical music and piano entertainment. Starting from 2004 he issued 290 compositions in 26 albums in Contra Music Publisher in Warsaw (currently Nieporęt). Since 2005 he is owner of poetic-musical soirées in the music schools, clubs and houses of culture in Poland.

He is also a writer. During many years he was a member of the Association of Writers and Pomorsko-Kujawski Włocławek Writers Union. He created 320 pieces that were issued in four volumes. His subsequent poems were published in regional newspapers and monthly Acanthus in Bydgoszcz. In 2014 he celebrated 15 years of work as a composer and 10 years of literary work.

== Music editions - piano works ==
- 26 Mazurkas for piano, issued in 2004, ISBN 83-7215-332-9, Publisher - Wydawnictwo Muzyczne Contra w Warszawie;
- Waltzes for piano - book no 1, issued in 2005, ISBN 83-7215-353-1, Publisher - Wydawnictwo Muzyczne Contra w Warszawie;
- Włocławian Stories - piano miniature, issued in 2005, ISBN 83-7215-338-8, Publisher - Wydawnictwo Muzyczne Contra w Warszawie;
- Waltzes for piano - book no 2, issued in 2006, ISBN 83-7215-364-7, Publisher - Wydawnictwo Muzyczne Contra w Warszawie;
- 26 Preludes for piano, issued in 2006, ISBN 83-7215-380-9, Publisher - Wydawnictwo Muzyczne Contra w Warszawie;
- Tangos for piano, issued in 2007, ISBN 83-7215-411-2, Publisher -Wydawnictwo Muzyczne Contra w Warszawie;
- Ewer of Love-Tangos, issued in 2007, ISBN 83-7215-433-3, Publisher -Wydawnictwo Muzyczne Contra w Warszawie;
- Etudes for piano, issued in 2008, ISBN 83-7215-477-5, Publisher - Wydawnictwo Muzyczne Contra w Warszawie;
- 20 Polish Folk Dances for piano, issued in 2008, ISBN 83-7215-449-X, Publisher - Wydawnictwo Muzyczne Contra w Warszawie;
- Sanok Impressions - piano miniature, issued in 2008, ISBN 83-7215-493-7, Publisher - Wydawnictwo Muzyczne Contra w Warszawie;
- 10 Lively Polish Fold Dances for piano, issued in 2008, ISBN 83-7215-492-9, Publisher - Wydawnictwo Muzyczne Contra w Nieporęcie;
- 10 Polkas for piano, issued in 2009, ISBN 83-7215-511-9, Publisher -Wydawnictwo Muzyczne Contra w Nieporęcie;
- Christmas Eve The Most Beautiful Time-carols, issued in 2009, ISBN 83-7215-542-9, Publisher - Wydawnictwo Muzyczne Contra w Warszawie;
- 10 Marches for piano - issued in 2010, ISBN 83-7215-572-0;
- Miniature Lublin memories - boston waltz- issued in 2010, ISBN 83-7215-573-9;
- Musical Rhythms - piano pieces - issued in 2010, ISBN 83-7215-581-X, Publisher -Wydawnictwo Muzyczne Contra;
- Puławskie fascynacje - miniature - issued 2011, ISBN 83-7215-600-X, Publisher-Wydawnictwo Muzyczne Contra;
- Fantazja h-minor - miniature - issued 2011, ISBN 83-7215-614-X, Publisher-Wydawnictwo Muzyczne Contra w Nieporęcie;
- Sonata F-major - issued 2011, ISBN 83-7215-617-4, Publisher-Wydawnictwo Muzyczne Contra w Nieporęcie;
- Ballad - piano miniatures - issued 2011, ISBN 83-7215-639-5, Publisher-Wydawnictwo Muzyczne Contra w Nieporęcie;
- Alchemy ballad - issued 2012, ISBN 83-7215-651-4, Publisher-Wydawnictwo Muzyczne Contra w Nieporęcie;
- Mazurka garden - 16 mazurkas for piano - issued 2012, ISBN 83-7215-658-1, Publisher-Wydawnictwo Muzyczne Contra w Nieporęcie;
- America's rhythms - dances for piano - issued 2012, ISBN 83-7215-682-4, Publisher-Wydawnictwo Muzyczne Contra w Nieporęcie;
- Romances - piano album - issued 2013, ISBN 83-7215-703-0, Publisher-Wydawnictwo Muzyczne Contra w Nieporęcie;
- Musical vein - songs and cantos with piano accompaniment, issued 2014, ISBN 83-7215-747-2, Publisher-Wydawnictwo Muzyczne Contra w Nieporęcie;
- Etudes for piano - second book - issued 2015, ISBN 83-7215-759-6, Publisher-Wydawnictwo Muzyczne Contra w Nieporęcie;
- 12 American Dances for piano - issued 2016, ISBN 978-83-63179-32-8, Publisher-Agencja Reklamowa TOP, Włocławek
- Trail of memories - piano works - issued 2019, ISBN 83-7215-889-4, Publisher-Wydawnictwo Muzyczne Contra w Nieporęcie;

== Literary works - poems ==
- Wierszowane Życie, issued in 2004, ISBN 83-89836-15-7, Publisher - Expol, P.Rybiński, J.Dąbek sp.j we Włocławku;
- Meetings with Musas, issued in 2007, ISBN 83-922812-5-X, Publisher -Miejska Biblioteka Publiczna im. Zdzisława Arentowicza we Włocławku;
- Wachlarz Spojrzeń, issued in 2009, ISBN 978-83-89836-23-6, Publisher -Expol, P.Rybiński, J.Dąbek, Spółka Jawna we Włocławku;
- Graffiti of everyday life, issued in 2011, ISBN 978-83-62459-20-9, Publisher - Miejska Biblioteka Publiczna we Włocławku
- In the landing place..., issued in 2020, ISBN 978-83-62459-09-4, Publisher - Miejska Biblioteka Publiczna we Włocławku

== Literary editions - books ==
- Following the Trail of Far Continents in reportage, poems and photography, together with Barbara Rybicka, Publisher - Advertising Agency TOP in Włocławek, 2018, ISBN 978-83-63179-67-0

== Phonograph records ==
- Musical moods, 13 piano pieces, issued in 2007, Publisher - Państwowa Szkoła Muzyczna I i II stopnia im. Wandy Kossakowej w Sanoku
- Wojciech Rybicki - Musical Fascinations, 12 piano pieces arranged by musical ensembles, issued in 2014, Publisher - Państwowa Szkoła Muzyczna I i II stopnia im. Wandy Kossakowej w Sanoku
