= Rafael Acosta (Uruguayan footballer) =

Uruguayan footballer (born 1990)

Alejandro Rafael Acosta
Personal information
- Full name: Alejandro Rafael Acosta
- Date of birth: 2 October 1990 (age 36)
- Place of birth: Maldonado, Uruguay
- Height: 1.70 m (5 ft 7 in)
- Position: Midfielder

Team information
- Current team: FK Jablonec
- Number: 18

Youth career
- –2012: Club Ituzaingó (Maldonado)

Senior career*
Years	Team	Apps	(Gls)
2012–2013	Deportivo Maldonado	23	(7)
2013–2016	Atenas	47	(8)
2015–2016	→ Bohemians 1905 (loan)	25	(6)
2016–2018	Veracruz	14	(0)
2018	→ FC Zbrojovka Brno (loan)	14	(2)
2018–	FK Jablonec	27	(1)
- * Club domestic league appearances and goals as of 6 August 2019

Alejandro Rafael Acosta Cabrera (born 2 October 1990) is a Uruguayan footballer currently playing for FK Jablonec in the Czech First League.

== Career ==
Acosta started his professional career playing for Deportivo Maldonado in October 2012. He made his debut on 13 October on a 0-0 home draw against Huracán F.C. on the first round of the 2012–13 season. On the third round he scored his first two goals against local derby Atenas De San Carlos winning the match 3-0 and being proclaimed man of the match.

In July 2013, he went to Argentina to be tested by Club Atlético Belgrano, but finally he did not stay at the club and returned to his country.

In early September 2013, Acosta signed a new contract with Atenas De San Carlos.

In July 2015, Acosta finally departed to Europe to play for Czech side Bohemians 1905 for 1-year loan.

On 23 June 2016, Acosta signed for Liga MX side Veracruz.
