= Michal Hubínek =

Czech footballer

Personal information
- Date of birth: 4 November 1994 (age 31)
- Place of birth: Třebíč, Czech Republic
- Height: 1.81 m (5 ft 11 in)
- Position: Midfielder

Team information
- Current team: Dynamo České Budějovice
- Number: 20

Youth career
- TJ Viktoria Vestec
- FŠ Optimum Sport Dobřejovice
- Bohemians 1905
- Sparta Prague

Senior career*
Years	Team	Apps	(Gls)
2013–2017	Bohemians 1905	46	(3)
2017–2021	Mladá Boleslav	74	(2)
2020–2021	→ Bruk-Bet Termalica (loan)	23	(0)
2021–2023	Bruk-Bet Termalica	54	(1)
2023–	Dynamo České Budějovice	77	(1)

International career
2016–2017	Czech Republic U21	10	(0)
- * Club domestic league appearances and goals as of 28 May 2026

Michal Hubínek (born 10 November 1994) is a Czech professional footballer who plays as a midfielder for Dynamo České Budějovice.

== Club career ==
He made his senior league debut for Bohemians 1905on 23 June 2015 in a Czech First League 3–2 home win against Viktoria Plzeň. He scored his first senior league goal on 17 October 2015 in a Czech First League home draw against Zbrojovka Brno.

On 5 October 2020, he joined Bruk-Bet Termalica Nieciecza in Poland on a season-long loan.

On 18 August 2023, Hubínek signed a three-year contract with last team of the league table Dynamo České Budějovice.
