= Ondřej Novotný =

Czech footballer

Personal information
- Date of birth: 5 February 1998 (age 28)
- Height: 1.83 m (6 ft 0 in)
- Position: Forward

Team information
- Current team: Kladno
- Number: 11

Youth career
- –2018: Sparta Prague

Senior career*
Years	Team	Apps	(Gls)
2018–2024	Sparta Prague	3	(0)
2018–2024	Sparta Prague B	36	(4)
2019	→ Vlašim (loan)	12	(0)
2019–2020	→ Ružomberok (loan)	15	(1)
2021–2022	→ Slovan Liberec (loan)	1	(0)
2022	→ 1. FK Příbram (loan)	13	(1)
2024	→ 1. FK Příbram (loan)	8	(1)
2024–2025	Silon Táborsko	4	(0)
2025–	Kladno	0	(0)

International career^{‡}
2016	Czech Republic U18	3	(0)
2016–2017	Czech Republic U19	9	(1)
- * Club domestic league appearances and goals as of 8 January 2025 ‡ National team caps and goals as of 2 July 2017

Ondřej Novotný (born 5 February 1998) is a Czech professional footballer who plays for Kladno.

== Club career ==
He was raised in the Sparta Prague youth teams and first was called up to the senior squad on 24 November 2016 for the Europa League game against Southampton. He remained on the bench.

He represented Sparta in 2016–17 and 2017–18 seasons of UEFA Youth League.

On 19 February 2019 he joined Sellier & Bellot Vlašim on loan. He made his professional FNL debut for Vlašim on 3 March 2019 in a game against Dynamo České Budějovice. He finished the loan with 12 appearances, 7 as a starter.

For the 2019–20 season he joined Slovak club Ružomberok, on a loan. He scored his first Fortuna Liga goal for Ružomberok on 17 August 2019 in a 2–2 draw against Senica, utilising the pass of Alexander Mojžiš and securing single point for Ružomberok in the 65th minute.

In January 2025, Novotný joined Kladno.
