= Václav Dudl =

Czech footballer (born 1999)

Personal information
- Full name: Václav Dudl
- Date of birth: 22 September 1999 (age 27)
- Place of birth: Hořovice, Czech Republic
- Height: 1.73 m (5 ft 8 in)
- Position: Left back

Team information
- Current team: Artis Brno B

Youth career
- Sparta Prague

Senior career*
| Years | Team | Apps | (Gls) |
| 2016–2019 | Sparta Prague | 5 | (0) |
| 2017 | → Vlašim (loan) | 5 | (0) |
| 2018 | → MAS Táborsko (loan) | 4 | (0) |
| 2019 | → Spartak Trnava (loan) | 4 | (0) |
| 2019–2022 | Sparta Prague B | 42 | (2) |
| 2020 | → Viktoria Žižkov (loan) | 7 | (0) |
| 2022–2024 | Příbram | 52 | (0) |
| 2024– | Artis Brno | 16 | (1) |
| 2025– | →→ Artis Brno B | 0 | (0) |

International career^{‡}
| 2014–2015 | Czech Republic U16 | 12 | (0) |
| 2015–2016 | Czech Republic U17 | 12 | (0) |
| 2016–2017 | Czech Republic U18 | 14 | (1) |
| 2017–2018 | Czech Republic U19 | 12 | (0) |
- * Club domestic league appearances and goals as of 4 January 2025 ‡ National team caps and goals as of 30 March 2018

Václav Dudl (born 22 September 1999) is a Czech footballer who plays for Artis Brno B as a left back.

== Club career ==
He made his senior league debut for Sparta Prague on 16 October 2016 in a Czech First League 3–0 home win against Vysočina Jihlava at the age of 17 years and 24 days.

== Honours ==
Spartak Trnava

- Slovak Cup: 2018–19
