= Roman Polom =

Czech footballer (born 1992)

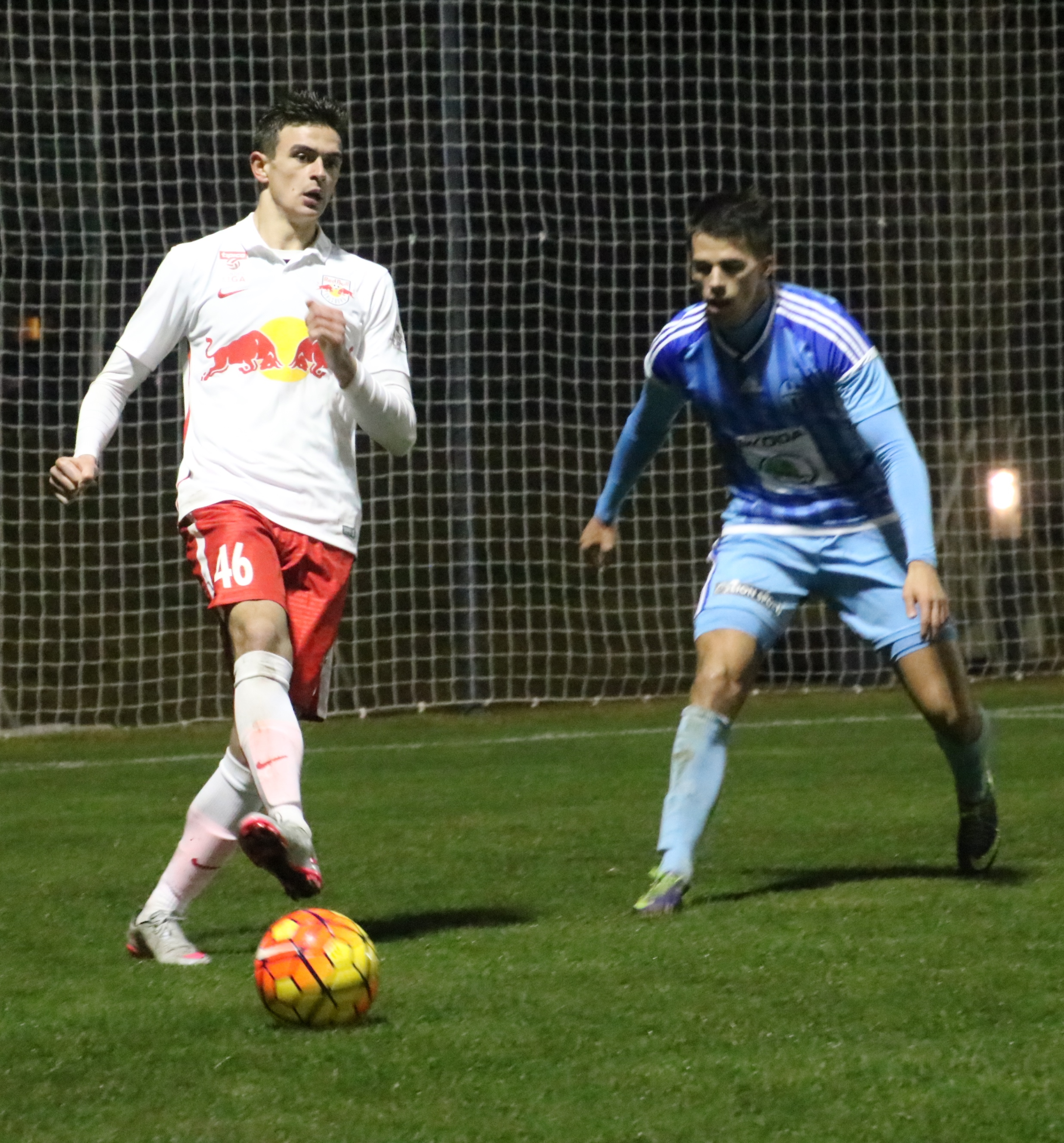
- Roman Polom (right) looked on, as Smail Prevljak (left) passed the ball during a match between Mladá Boleslav and Red Bull Salzburg in 2016.

Personal information
- Date of birth: 11 January 1992 (age 34)
- Place of birth: Sokolov, Czechoslovakia
- Height: 1.84 m (6 ft 0 in)
- Position: Centre-back

Youth career
- Sparta Prague

Senior career*
Years	Team	Apps	(Gls)
2010–2016	Sparta Prague	7	(0)
2010–2012	→ Sparta Prague B	40	(3)
2014–2015	→ Dukla Prague (loan)	19	(3)
2015–2016	→ Mladá Boleslav (loan)	9	(0)
2016–2018	Mladá Boleslav	0	(0)
2016–2017	→ Hradec Králové (loan)	8	(0)
2017–2018	→ Sigma Olomouc (loan)	6	(0)
2018–2019	Sigma Olomouc	11	(0)
2019–2020	České Budějovice	0	(0)

International career
2008	Czech Republic U16	3	(0)
2008–2009	Czech Republic U17	9	(1)
2009	Czech Republic U18	5	(2)
2009–2011	Czech Republic U19	12	(0)
2012	Czech Republic U20	1	(0)
2013–2015	Czech Republic U21	6	(0)
- * Club domestic league appearances and goals as of 14 August 2019

Roman Polom (born 11 January 1992) is a former Czech football player who last played for SK Dynamo České Budějovice in the Czech First League.

He represented the Czech Republic at under-21 level and was in the Czech squad for the 2011 UEFA European Under-19 Football Championship, where he played four of his country's matches.

He made his top league debut in the 2012–13 season for AC Sparta Prague. In May 2014 it was announced that Polom would join Dukla Prague on a year-long loan.

He announced his retirement in September 2020 after a long series of injuries at the age of 28.
