= Michal Petráň =

Czech footballer

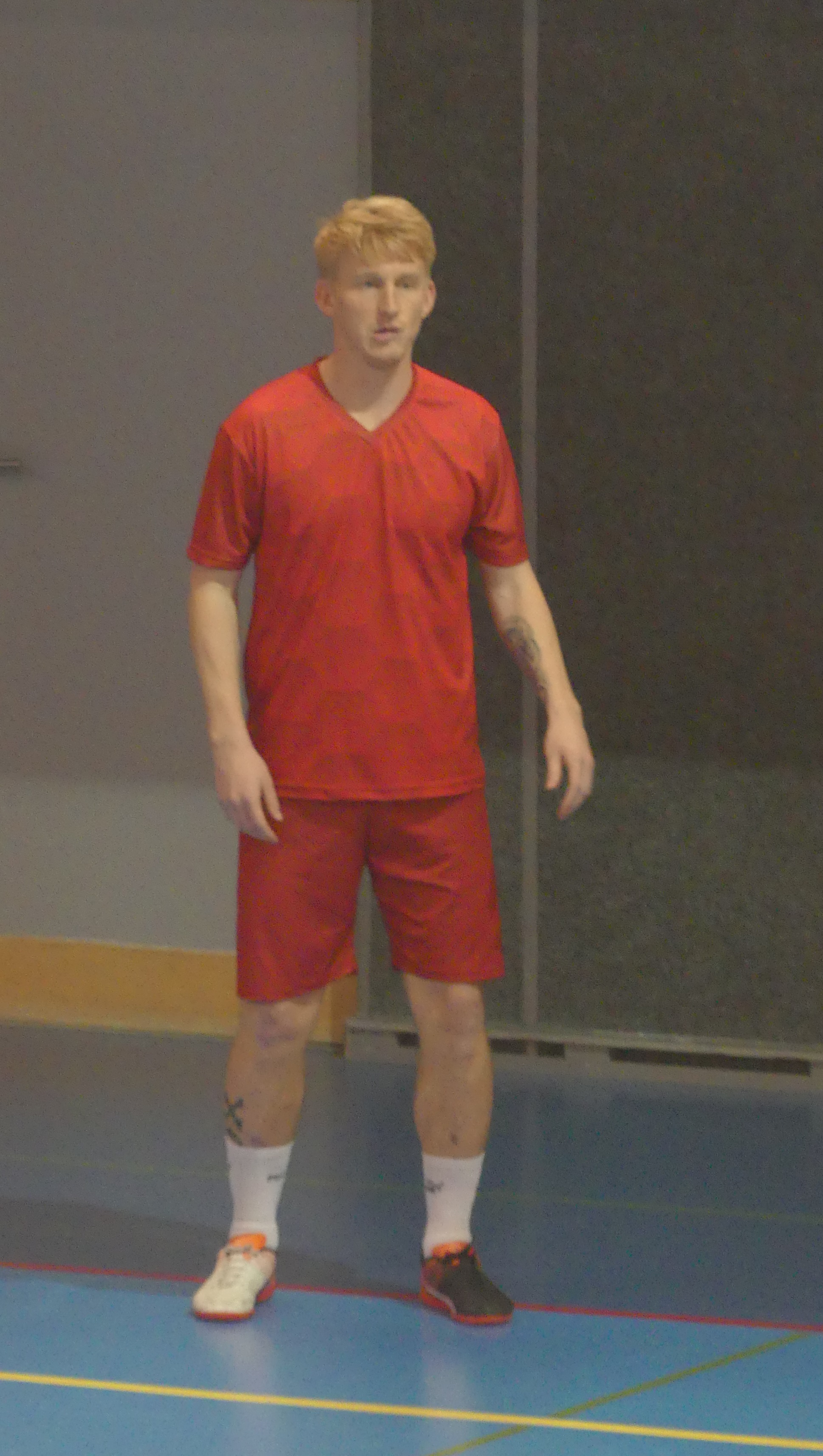

Personal information
- Date of birth: 26 June 1992 (age 34)
- Place of birth: Czechoslovakia
- Height: 1.84 m (6 ft 0 in)
- Position: Forward

Team information
- Current team: Viktoria Žižkov
- Number: 11

Youth career
- 2006–2010: Pardubice

Senior career*
Years	Team	Apps	(Gls)
2010–2015	České Budějovice	8	(0)
2013–2014	→ Strakonice (loan)		
2014–2015	→ Pardubice (loan)	20	(5)
2015–2022	Pardubice	114	(36)
2019–2020	→ Karviná (loan)	20	(3)
2021–2022	→ Fotbal Třinec (loan)	29	(6)
2022–	Viktoria Žižkov	14	(5)
- * Club domestic league appearances and goals as of 21:53, 9 April 2023 (UTC)

Michal Petráň (born 26 June 1992) is a Czech professional footballer who plays for Viktoria Žižkov.
