= Robert Bartolomeu =

Czech footballer

Personal information
- Full name: Robert Bartolomeu
- Date of birth: 3 December 1993 (age 32)
- Place of birth: Zlín, Czech Republic
- Height: 1.72 m (5 ft 8 in)
- Position: Midfielder

Team information
- Current team: Hanácká Slavia Kroměříž
- Number: 25

Youth career
- Viktoria Otrokovice
- Fastav Zlín

Senior career*
Years	Team	Apps	(Gls)
2012–2018	Fastav Zlín	86	(9)
2016–2017	→ Znojmo (loan)	10	(3)
2018	→ ViOn Zlaté Moravce (loan)	11	(0)
2018–2020	Zbrojovka Brno	23	(3)
2020–2021	Blansko	14	(1)
2021–2025	Prostějov	111	(14)
2025–	Hanácká Slavia Kroměříž	23	(1)

International career
	Czech Republic U18	2	(1)
	Czech Republic U19	2	(0)
- * Club domestic league appearances and goals as of 28 May 2026

Robert Bartolomeu (born 3 December 1993) is a Czech professional footballer who plays as a midfielder for Hanácká Slavia Kroměříž.

He made his career league debut for Fastav Zlín on 11 August 2012 in a Czech National Football League 0–4 away loss at Olomouc. He scored his first goal in Zlín's Czech National Football League 3–0 home win against Zenit Čáslav on 7 October 2012. On 17 May 2017, he scored the winning goal in Zlín's 1–0 victory against Opava in the Czech FA Cup final, helping his club to its first major trophy in its history.

On 1 July 2025, Bartolomeu signed a contract with Hanácká Slavia Kroměříž.

Bartolomeu is of Angolan ancestry.

== Honours ==
=== Club ===
Zlín

- Winner: Czech Cup 2016–17
