= Jakub Yunis =

Czech footballer (born 1996)

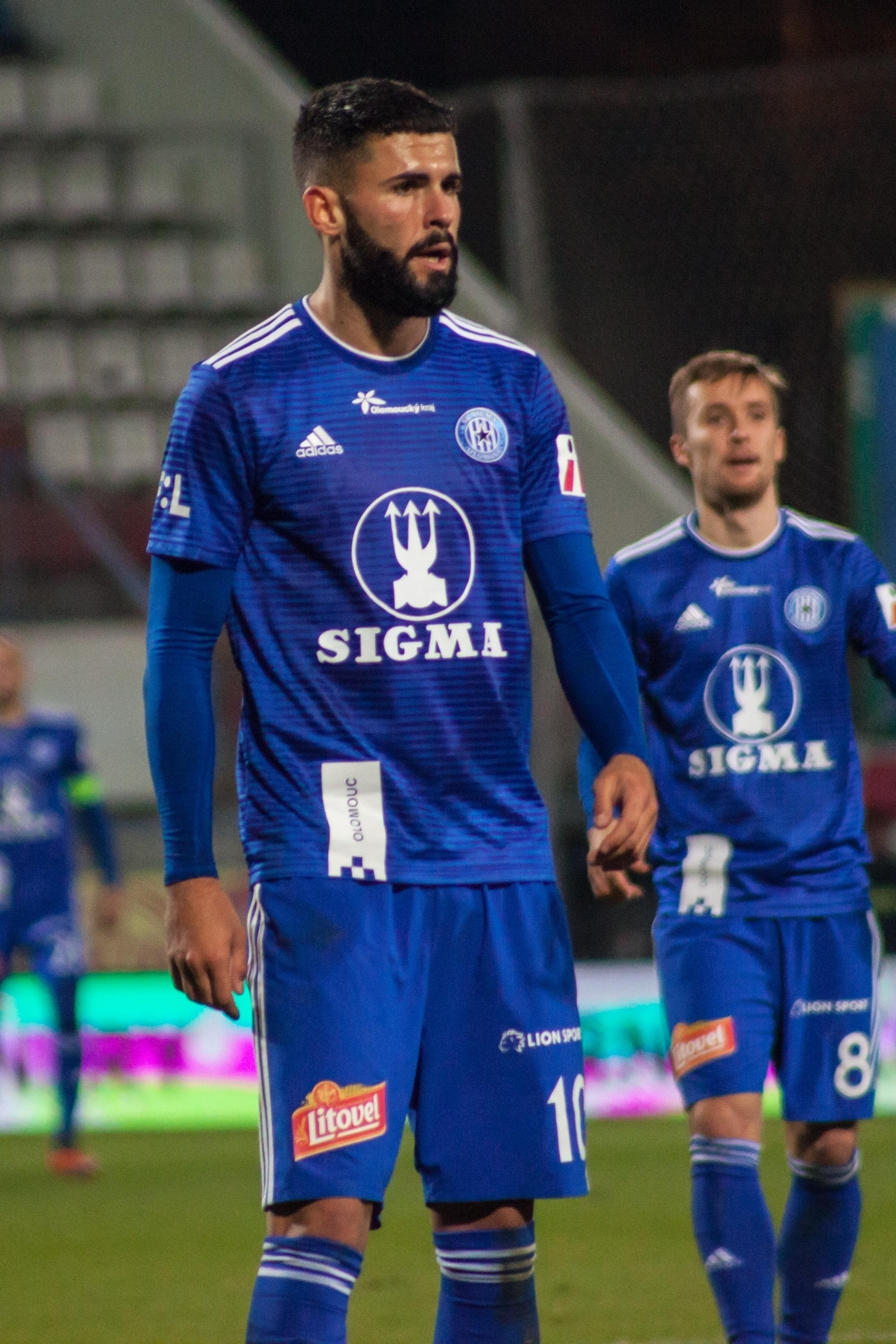
- Yunis with Sigma Olomouc

Personal information
- Date of birth: 25 March 1996 (age 30)
- Place of birth: Brno, Czech Republic
- Height: 1.90 m (6 ft 3 in)
- Position: Forward

Youth career
- Sigma Olomouc

Senior career*
| Years | Team | Apps | (Gls) |
| 2015–2022 | Sigma Olomouc | 87 | (7) |
| 2015 | → Mohelnice (loan) | 9 | (3) |
| 2017 | → GKS Katowice (loan) | 6 | (1) |
| 2022–2023 | Opava | 16 | (1) |
| 2023 | Erbil | 0 | (0) |

International career
| 2012 | Czech Republic U16 | 10 | (2) |
| 2012 | Czech Republic U17 | 1 | (0) |
| 2014 | Czech Republic U18 | 2 | (0) |
| 2014–2015 | Czech Republic U19 | 11 | (1) |
| 2015–2016 | Czech Republic U20 | 8 | (2) |
- * Club domestic league appearances and goals as of 25 March 2024

Jakub Yunis (born 25 March 1996) is a Czech professional footballer who plays as a forward.

== Career ==
Sigma Olomouc coach Václav Jílek described him as a natural defensive forward. He made his league debut in Sigma Olomouc's Czech National Football League 5–1 loss at Třinec on 1 August 2015. He made his first starting 11 appearance in October 2016, scoring two goals in a 2–1 comeback win at Vítkovice.

In the 2023 transfer window, Jakub Yunis signed for Iraqi side Erbil SC. He had completed his Iraqi paperwork so he qualifies as a local player.

== International career ==
Jakub Younis is eligible to represent the Czech Republic, through his mother as well as his place of birth, and Iraq through his father, who originates from the city of Mosul. He has represented Czechia at many youth levels but has not represented them at senior level.

In September 2015, he scored the winning goal in Czech Republic Under-20 national team's 1–0 victory against England.

In 2023, Yunis obtained an Iraqi passport so he is eligible to play for Iraq, subject to FIFA transferring his paperwork from the Czech FA to the Iraqi FA.
