= Lukáš Pazdera =

Czech footballer

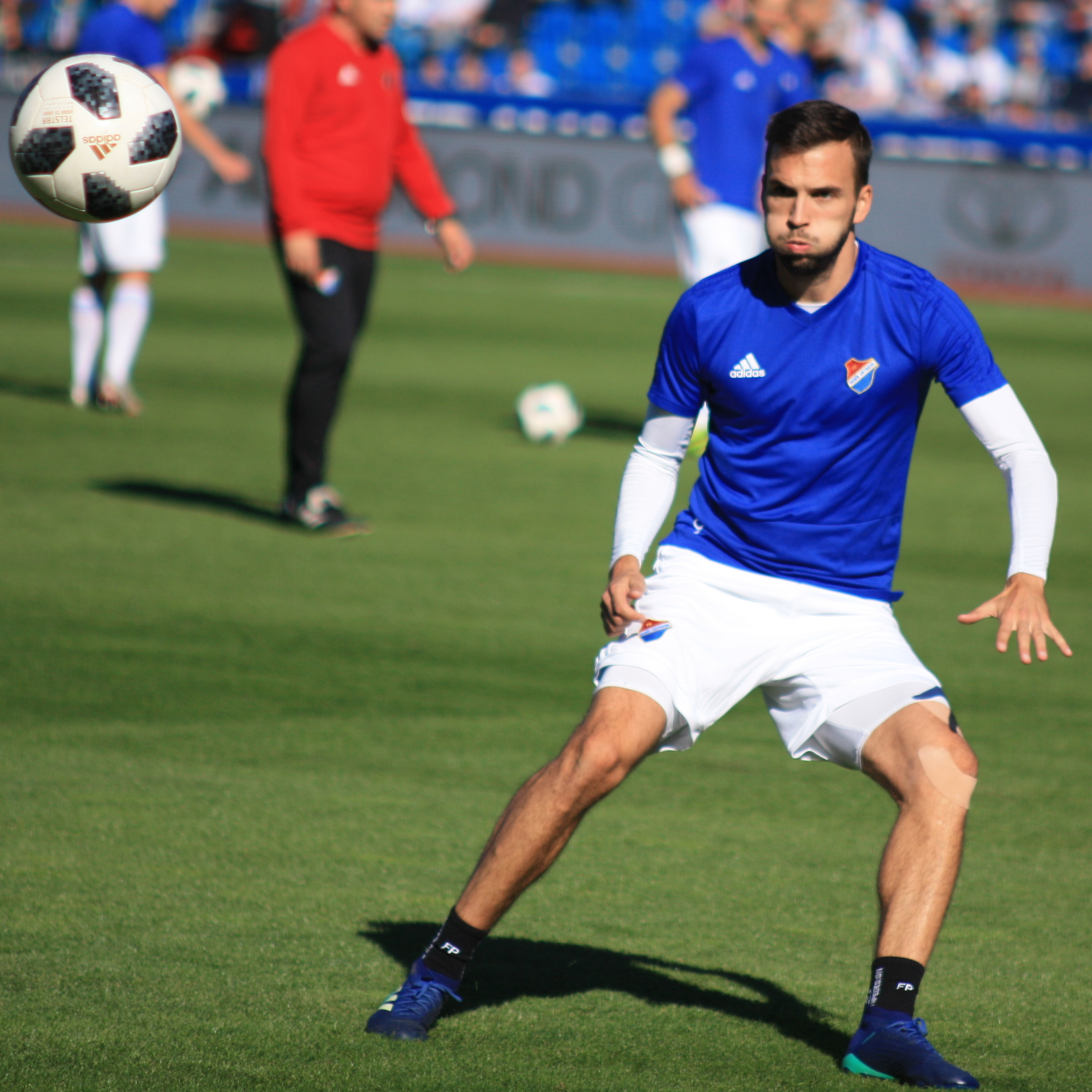

Personal information
- Date of birth: 6 March 1987 (age 39)
- Place of birth: Czechoslovakia
- Height: 1.83 m (6 ft 0 in)
- Position: Right back

Team information
- Current team: Příbram
- Number: 9

Youth career
- Fastav Zlín

Senior career*
Years	Team	Apps	(Gls)
2007–2017	Fastav Zlín	191	(7)
2017–2020	Baník Ostrava	50	(2)
2020–	Příbram	12	(0)
- * Club domestic league appearances and goals as of 17:01, 8 August 2020 (UTC)

Lukáš Pazdera (born 6 March 1987) is a Czech football player, who currently plays for 1. FK Příbram as a defender. He made his Gambrinus liga debut for Zlín against Brno on 5 August 2007.

== Career ==
=== Club career ===
On 9 January 2020, Pazdera moved to Czech First League club 1. FK Příbram on a deal until the summer 2021.
