= Prague 20 =

Prague 20 Praha 20
- Municipal District of Prague; Administrative District of Prague
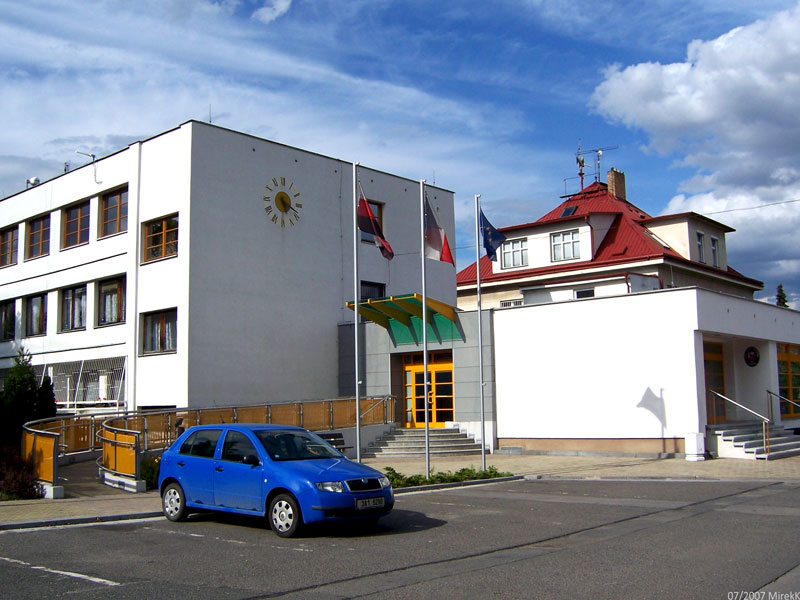
- Prague 20 town hall

- Flag Coat of arms

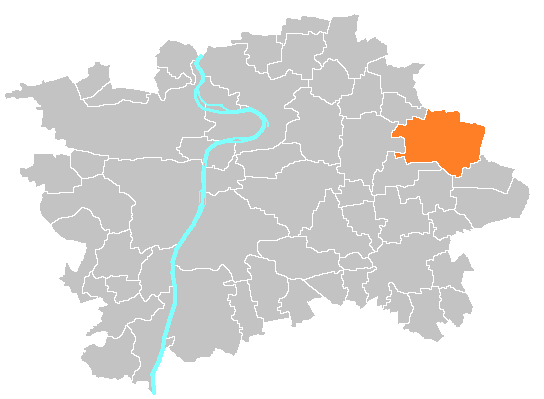
- Location of Prague 20 in Prague
- Coordinates: 50°6′53″N 14°36′45″E
- Country: Czech Republic
- Region: Prague

Government
  - Mayor: Petr Měšťan

Area
  - Total: 16.95 km^{2} (6.54 sq mi)

Population (2021)
  - Total: 15,303
  - Density: 902.8/km^{2} (2,338/sq mi)
- Time zone: UTC+1 (CET)
  - Summer (DST): UTC+2 (CEST)
- Postal code: 193 00
- Website: http://www.pocernice.cz/

Prague 20, also known as Horní Počernice (German Ober Potschernitz), is a municipal district (městská část) in Prague. It is located in the eastern part of the city. It is formed by one cadastre Horní Počernice. As of 2021, there were 15,303 inhabitants living in Prague 20.

The administrative district (správní obvod) of the same name is identical with the municipal district Prague 20.

== Demographics ==
Historical population
Year	Pop.	±%
1869	1,710	—
1880	1,868	+9.2%
1890	1,938	+3.7%
1900	2,064	+6.5%
1910	2,178	+5.5%
1921	2,748	+26.2%
1930	6,324	+130.1%
1950	7,698	+21.7%
1961	8,358	+8.6%
1970	9,043	+8.2%
1980	10,836	+19.8%
1991	12,162	+12.2%
2001	13,036	+7.2%
2011	15,262	+17.1%
2021	15,303	+0.3%
Source: Censuses

== Twin towns ==
- Brunsbüttel, Germany (2004)
