= Petr Rybička =

Czech footballer

Personal information
- Date of birth: 14 January 1996 (age 30)
- Place of birth: Chrudim, Czech Republic
- Height: 1.86 m (6 ft 1 in)
- Position: Forward

Team information
- Current team: FC Hradec Králové

Youth career
- 2003−2008: FK Kameničky
- 2008−2014: Chrudim

Senior career*
Years	Team	Apps	(Gls)
2014−2016	Chrudim	40	(25)
2016–2019	Zbrojovka Brno	2	(0)
2016–2017	→ Znojmo (loan)	14	(5)
2017	→ Pardubice (loan)	7	(0)
2018–2019	→ Chrudim (loan)	43	(14)
2019−2022	Chrudim	16	(1)
2022−	FC Hradec Králové	18	(1)
2023−	→ Opava (loan)	6	(0)

International career
2016	Czech Republic U-20	2	(0)
- * Club domestic league appearances and goals as of 19 June 2023

Petr Rybička (born 14 January 1996) is a Czech football player who currently plays for Czech First League side FC Hradec Králové.

== Honours ==
- MFK Chrudim
  - ČFL top-goalscorer: 2015-2016
