= Pavel Moulis =

Czech footballer

Personal information
- Date of birth: 7 April 1991 (age 35)
- Place of birth: Teplice, Czechoslovakia
- Height: 1.82 m (6 ft 0 in)
- Position: Midfielder

Team information
- Current team: Ústí nad Labem
- Number: 14

Youth career
- 1997–2002: Duchcov
- 2002–2010: Teplice

Senior career*
Years	Team	Apps	(Gls)
2010–2013	Teplice	0	(0)
2011–2013	→ Ústí nad Labem (loan)	65	(13)
2014–2015	Jablonec	12	(1)
2015	→ Příbram (loan)	9	(1)
2015–2018	Sigma Olomouc	33	(2)
2016–2017	→ Ústí nad Labem (loan)	28	(10)
2018–2022	Teplice	93	(9)
2022–2025	Dukla Prague	62	(12)
2025	→ Ústí nad Labem (loan)	14	(6)
2025–	Ústí nad Labem	30	(6)
- * Club domestic league appearances and goals as of 28 May 2026

Pavel Moulis (born 7 April 1991) is a Czech professional footballer who plays for Ústí nad Labem.

Moulis scored for Ústí nad Labem in the playoff final after the end of the 2024–25 Bohemian Football League season, helping his team achieve promotion to the following season's Czech National Football League.
