= 2017–18 FK Dukla Prague season =

Dukla Prague
2017–18 season
- Chairman: Michal Prokeš
- Manager: Jaroslav Hynek
- Stadium: Stadion Juliska
- Czech First League: 11th
- Czech Cup: Third Round
- Top goalscorer: League: Jan Holenda (7); All: Jan Holenda (9)
- Highest home attendance: 7,324 v Slavia Prague (14 May 2018)
- Lowest home attendance: 827 v Jablonec (23 February 2018)
- Average home league attendance: 2,819
Home colours	Away colours

The 2017–18 season was Dukla Prague's seventh consecutive season in the Czech First League.

== Players ==
=== Squad information ===
As of 6 October 2017.

Note: Flags indicate national team as defined under FIFA eligibility rules; some limited exceptions apply. Players may hold more than one non-FIFA nationality.

No.	Pos.	Nation	Player
1	GK	(Czech Republic) CZE	Filip Rada
3	FW	(Czech Republic) CZE	Štěpán Koreš
4	MF	(Czech Republic) CZE	Ondřej Brejcha
5	MF	(Czech Republic) CZE	Marek Hanousek
6	DF	(Czech Republic) CZE	David Douděra
8	FW	(Czech Republic) CZE	Patrik Brandner
9	FW	(Czech Republic) CZE	Jan Holenda
10	MF	(Slovakia) SVK	Frederik Bilovský
11	MF	(Bosnia and Herzegovina) BIH	Zinedin Mustedanagić
14	DF	(Serbia) SRB	Ivan Ostojić
15	MF	(Czech Republic) CZE	Daniel Tetour
16	MF	(Slovakia) SVK	Róbert Kovaľ
19	MF	(Czech Republic) CZE	Lukáš Holík
20	DF	(Serbia) SRB	Branislav Milošević

No.	Pos.	Nation	Player
22	DF	(Czech Republic) CZE	Mario Holek
23	DF	(Montenegro) MNE	Uroš Đuranović
25	MF	(Czech Republic) CZE	Michal Bezpalec
26	FW	(Slovakia) SVK	Ivan Schranz
27	DF	(Czech Republic) CZE	Dominik Preisler
28	FW	(Czech Republic) CZE	Adam Vlček
29	GK	(Slovakia) SVK	Matúš Hruška
30	GK	(Czech Republic) CZE	Patrik Czehowsky
33	DF	(Czech Republic) CZE	Ondřej Kušnír
39	DF	(Czech Republic) CZE	Jakub Podaný
52	DF	(Czech Republic) CZE	Martin Jiránek
—	MF	(Slovakia) SVK	Samuel Dancák
—	MF	(Czech Republic) CZE	Daniel Kozel
—	DF	(Czech Republic) CZE	David Šimek

=== Transfers ===
==== In ====
Over the summer, forwards Ivan Schranz arrived from Slovak outfit Trnava, and Uroš Đuranović signed from FK Dečić.

The defence was strengthened with Ivan Ostojić signing a two-year deal, arriving from Cypriot side Karmiotissa, as well as Martin Jiránek arriving from Příbram.

Ladislav Vopat returned to the club after his loan at České Budějovice. There were further arrivals in September: midfielder Lukáš Holík joined from Zlín and former national team defender Mario Holek joined on loan from Sparta Prague.

In January 2018 Ivorian midfielder Mohamed Doumbia joined the club from Finnish second-tier side Ekenäs IF, signing a contract until the end of the 2018–19 season. Former Dukla striker Néstor Albiach joined the club on a short-term loan from Sparta Prague in February 2018.

==== Out ====
Three defenders left the club over the summer: Lukáš Štetina left to join Sparta Prague, Jan Šimůnek moved to Vasas SC in Hungary, while Michal Smejkal finished his professional career. Midfielder Jan Juroška joined league rivals Slovácko. Emmanuel Edmond also left the club. Striker Peter Olayinka returned to Ghent after the end of his year-long loan.

In the winter break, midfielder Zinedin Mustedanagić returned to Sparta Prague after the expiry of his loan. Róbert Kovaľ, also a midfielder, went out on loan to former club Zemplín Michalovce.

== Management and coaching staff ==
Position	Name
Manager	Jaroslav Hynek
Coach	Pavel Drsek
Goalkeeping Coach	Tomáš Obermajer
Fitness Coach	Lukáš Stránský
Team Leader	Petr Malý
Masseur	Radek Havala, Daniel Kotek
Doctor	Ladislav Šindelář
Custodian	Jan Švestka

== Statistics ==
=== Home attendance ===
The club had the lowest average attendance in the league.

Competition	Average Attendance	Games
Czech First League	2,819	15
Cup	0	0
Average	2,819	15

== Czech First League ==
=== Results by round ===
Round	1	2	3	4	5	6	7	8	9	10	11	12	13	14	15	16	17	18	19	20	21	22	23	24	25	26	27	28	29	30
Ground	A	A	H	A	H	A	H	A	H	A	H	A	H	A	H	H	A	H	A	H	A	H	A	H	A	H	A	H	A	H
Result	L	L	W	D	W	L	W	L	D	L	D	D	W	L	W	L	D	L	L	L	W	L	L	W	L	W	W	L	L	L
Position	16	16	12	12	7	10	8	9	9	10	10	11	11	11	10	10	10	11	11	13	10	12	13	10	13	10	9	9	10	11

Source: fortunaliga.cz
A = Away; H = Home; W = Win; D = Draw; L = Loss

=== Results summary ===
Overall								Home						Away					
Pld	W	D	L	GF	GA	GD	Pts	W	D	L	GF	GA	GD	W	D	L	GF	GA	GD
30	9	5	16	32	55	−23	32	7	2	6	21	21	0	2	3	10	11	34	−23

Source: fortunaliga.cz

=== League table ===
Pos	Team	Pld	W	D	L	GF	GA	GD	Pts
9	Mladá Boleslav	30	9	7	14	31	43	−12	34
10	Fastav Zlín	30	8	9	13	31	48	−17	33
11	Dukla Prague	30	9	5	16	32	55	−23	32
12	Slovácko	30	6	13	11	23	32	−9	31
13	Baník Ostrava	30	7	10	13	36	43	−7	31

Source: Fortuna liga, Soccerway
Rules for classification: 1) Points; 2) Head-to-head points; 3) Head-to-head goal difference; 4) Head-to-head goals scored; 5) Goal difference; 6) Goals scored; 7) Play-off (only if deciding champion, UEFA competitions, or relegation); 8) Draw.

=== Matches ===
==== July ====
29 July 2017 Round 1	Viktoria Plzeň	4 – 0	Dukla Prague	Plzeň
	Hejda 10'; Hrošovský 16'; Krmenčík 33'; Hořava 42'	Report		Stadium: Doosan Arena; Attendance: 9,624; Referee: Bolek

==== August ====
5 August 2017 Round 2	Teplice	3 – 1	Dukla Prague	Teplice
	Ljevaković 29'; Vaněček 32', 60'	Report	73' Milošević	Stadium: Na Stínadlech; Attendance: 4,251; Referee: Zelinka

13 August 2017 Round 3	Dukla Prague	1 – 0	Zlín	Prague
	Kušnír 24'	Report		Stadium: Stadion Juliska; Attendance: 2,359; Referee: Ginzel

20 August 2017 Round 4	Jablonec	2 – 2	Dukla Prague	Jablonec nad Nisou
	Tecl 15'; Mehanović 30'	Report	32' Schranz; 78' Holenda	Stadium: Stadion Střelnice; Attendance: 2,812; Referee: Houdek

25 August 2017 Round 5	Dukla Prague	2 – 0	Bohemians 1905	Prague
	Kovaľ 24'; Mustedanagić 82'	Report		Stadium: Stadion Juliska; Attendance: 5,127; Referee: Nenadál

==== September ====
10 September 2017 Round 6	Vysočina Jihlava	3 – 2	Dukla Prague	Jihlava
	Fulnek 22'; Dvořák 88'; Ikaunieks 90'	Report	23' (o.g.) Krejčí; 71' Brandner	Stadium: Stadion v Jiráskově ulici Attendance: 2,462; Referee: Berka

15 September 2017 Round 7	Dukla Prague	2 – 0	Baník Ostrava	Prague
	Holenda 4', 72'	Report		Stadium: Stadion Juliska; Attendance: 3,359; Referee: Franěk

23 September 2017 Round 8	Olomouc	3 – 0	Dukla Prague	Olomouc
	Plšek 17', 32'; Sladký 79'	Report		Stadium: Andrův stadion Attendance: 3,657; Referee: Berka

30 September 2017 Round 9	Dukla Prague	0 – 0	Sparta Prague	Prague
		Report		Stadium: Stadion Juliska; Attendance: 6,547; Referee: Hrubeš

==== October ====
14 October 2017 Round 10	Liberec	3 – 0	Dukla Prague	Liberec
	Kerbr 25' (pen.), 77'; Graiciar 48'	Report		Stadium: Stadion u Nisy; Attendance: 3,929; Referee: Matějček

19 October 2017 Round 11	Dukla Prague	1 – 1	Slovácko	Prague
	Podaný 79'	Report	42' Zajíc	Stadium: Stadion Juliska; Attendance: 1,332; Referee: Orel

28 October 2017 Round 12	Zbrojovka Brno	0 – 0	Dukla Prague	Brno
		Report		Stadium: Městský fotbalový stadion Srbská; Attendance: 3,012; Referee: Ardeleánu

==== November ====
4 November 2017 Round 13	Dukla Prague	3 – 2	Karviná	Prague
	Preisler 62'; Holenda 85'; Holík 89'	Report	38' Panák; 55' Budínský	Stadium: Stadion Juliska; Attendance: 1,626; Referee: Pechanec

18 November 2017 Round 14	Slavia Prague	5 – 0	Dukla Prague	Prague
	Škoda 9', 32'; Zmrhal 54', 65'; Souček 82'	Report		Stadium: Eden Arena; Attendance: 10,505; Referee: Královec

25 November 2017 Round 15	Dukla Prague	4 – 1	Mladá Boleslav	Prague
	Podaný 4'; Đuranović 6', 70'; Holenda 51'	Report	26' Přikryl	Stadium: Stadion Juliska; Attendance: 1,391; Referee: Julínek

==== December ====
2 December 2017 Round 16	Dukla Prague	0 – 2	Teplice	Prague
		Report	31' Fillo; 48' Rezek	Stadium: Stadion Juliska; Attendance: 1,322; Referee: Příhoda

==== February ====
17 February 2018 Round 17	Zlín	1 – 1	Dukla Prague	Zlín
	Hronek 73'	Report	62' Tetour	Stadium: Letná Stadion; Attendance: 3,024; Referee: Příhoda

23 February 2018 Round 18	Dukla Prague	0 – 1	Jablonec	Prague
		Report	64' Lischka	Stadium: Stadion Juliska; Attendance: 827; Referee: Zelinka

==== March ====
2 March 2018 Round 19	Bohemians 1905	2 – 0	Dukla Prague	Prague
	Mašek 28' (pen.); Tetteh 86'	Report		Stadium: Ďolíček; Attendance: 1,905; Referee: Berka

9 March 2018 Round 20	Dukla Prague	1 – 3	Jihlava	Prague
	Holenda 85'	Report	10' Ikaunieks; 30' Zoubele; 69' Urblík	Stadium: Stadion Juliska; Attendance: 1,154; Referee: Machálek

17 March 2018 Round 21	Baník Ostrava	1 – 2	Dukla Prague	Ostrava
	Baroš 90'	Report	38' Brandner; 67' Kušnír	Stadium: Městský stadion Attendance: 3,916; Referee: Nenadál

30 March 2018 Round 22	Dukla Prague	2 – 3	Olomouc	Prague
	Schranz 27'; Kušnír 71'	Report	31', 58', 68' Řezníček	Stadium: Stadion Juliska; Attendance: 1,761; Referee: Franěk

==== April ====
7 April 2018 Round 23	Sparta Prague	3 – 0	Dukla Prague	Prague
	Šural 3', 80'; Plavšić 14'	Report		Stadium: Generali Arena; Attendance: 11,123; Referee: Julínek

14 April 2018 Round 24	Dukla Prague	2 – 0	Liberec	Prague
	Schranz 55'; Holík 82'	Report		Stadium: Stadion Juliska; Attendance: 2,796; Referee: Hrubeš

21 April 2018 Round 25	Slovácko	2 – 0	Dukla Prague	Uherské Hradiště
	Havlík 39', 45' (pen.)	Report		Stadium: Městský fotbalový stadion Miroslava Valenty; Attendance: 4,362; Referee: Královec

27 April 2018 Round 26	Dukla Prague	2 – 1	Zbrojovka Brno	Prague
	Holík 43'; Schranz 57'	Report	31' Škoda	Stadium: Stadion Juliska; Attendance: 2,527; Referee: Příhoda

==== May ====
5 May 2018 Round 27	Karviná	1 – 3	Dukla Prague	Karviná
	Kalabiška 48'	Report	30' Đuranović; 50' Holík; 61' Milošević	Stadium: Městský stadion Attendance: 3,117; Referee: Julínek

14 May 2018 Round 28	Dukla Prague	0 – 2	Slavia Prague	Prague
		Report	11' Sýkora; 90' Stoch	Stadium: Stadion Juliska; Attendance: 7,324; Referee: Ardeleanu

19 May 2018 Round 29	Mladá Boleslav	1 – 0	Dukla Prague	Mladá Boleslav
	Komlichenko 22'	Report		Stadium: Městský stadion Attendance: 1,990; Referee: Ginzel

26 May 2018 Round 30	Dukla Prague	1 – 5	Viktoria Plzeň	Prague
	Preisler 37'	Report	3', 14', 59' Krmenčík; 30' Čermák; 66' Štursa	Stadium: Stadion Juliska; Attendance: 2,841; Referee: Dubravský

== Cup ==
As a First League team, Dukla entered the Cup at the second round stage. In the second round, Dukla faced Bohemian Football League side Převýšov, the same opponent at the same stage in the previous season. Dukla won the match 2–0 away from home. The third round match was away against Jiskra Domažlice, a team which had beaten Dukla in the second round of the 2014–15 competition. Despite taking a 1–0 lead into half time, Dukla conceded three goals in the second half and lost 3–2, signalling the end of this season's cup run.

9 August 2017 Second Round	SK Převýšov	0 – 2	Dukla Prague	Převýšov
		Report	38' Holenda; 88' Đuranović	Attendance: 550; Referee: Berka

20 September 2017 Third Round	Jiskra Domažlice	3 – 2	Dukla Prague	Velké Meziříčí
	Hrubý 52'; Mužík 55', 67'	Report	18' Ostojić; 64' Holenda	Attendance: 1,021; Referee: Rejžek
