= 2016–17 FK Dukla Prague season =

Dukla Prague
2016–17 season
- Chairman: Michal Prokeš
- Manager: Jaroslav Šilhavý (until 5 September 2016); Jaroslav Hynek (from 5 September 2016)
- Stadium: Stadion Juliska
- Czech First League: 7th
- Czech Cup: Fourth Round
- Top goalscorer: League: Jan Holenda (6); All: Jan Holenda (6); Peter Olayinka (6)
- Highest home attendance: 6,243 v Sparta Prague (28 August 2016)
- Lowest home attendance: 542 v Slovácko (4 December 2016)
- Average home league attendance: 2,199
Home colours	Away colours

The 2016–17 season was Dukla Prague's sixth consecutive season in the Czech First League.

== Players ==
=== Squad information ===
As of 15 September 2016.

Note: Flags indicate national team as defined under FIFA eligibility rules; some limited exceptions apply. Players may hold more than one non-FIFA nationality.

No.	Pos.	Nation	Player
1	GK	(Czech Republic) CZE	Filip Rada
3	FW	(Czech Republic) CZE	Štěpán Koreš
5	MF	(Czech Republic) CZE	Marek Hanousek
6	DF	(Czech Republic) CZE	Jan Juroška
7	MF	(Slovakia) SVK	Jakub Považanec
8	MF	(Bosnia and Herzegovina) BIH	Aldin Čajić
9	FW	(France) FRA	Jean-David Beauguel
10	FW	(Spain) ESP	Néstor Albiach Roger
11	FW	(Democratic Republic of the Congo) COD	Budge Manzia
12	MF	(Czech Republic) CZE	Michal Bezpalec
12	MF	(Czech Republic) CZE	Ondřej Brejcha
13	FW	(Czech Republic) CZE	Ladislav Vopat

No.	Pos.	Nation	Player
14	FW	(Nigeria) NGA	Peter Olayinka
15	MF	(Czech Republic) CZE	Daniel Tetour
16	MF	(Slovakia) SVK	Róbert Kovaľ
19	DF	(Slovakia) SVK	Lukáš Štetina
20	DF	(Serbia) SRB	Branislav Milošević
21	DF	(Czech Republic) CZE	Michal Smejkal
22	DF	(Czech Republic) CZE	Jan Šimůnek
23	DF	(Czech Republic) CZE	Ondřej Vrzal
27	DF	(Czech Republic) CZE	Dominik Preisler
30	GK	(Slovakia) SVK	Lukáš Hroššo
33	DF	(Czech Republic) CZE	Ondřej Kušnír
39	DF	(Czech Republic) CZE	Jakub Podaný

=== Transfers ===
==== In ====
In the summer of 2016, striker Peter Olayinka arrived on a year-long loan from Belgian side Ghent. Defenders Ondřej Kušnír, Jakub Podaný and Jan Šimůnek joined as free agents. Other players to arrive were Štěpán Koreš, Ondřej Brejcha and Ladislav Vopat. Midfielder Jan Juroška returned to the club after a loan period at Táborsko.

In January 2017 Příbram midfielder Patrik Brandner joined the club, signing a contract until the end of the 2018–19 season. Striker Jan Holenda signed a contract with Dukla until the summer of 2019. Two players arrived from Slovak side Myjava: goalkeeper Matúš Hruška and midfielder Frederik Bilovský. Bosnian midfielder Zinedin Mustedanagić joined on loan from Sparta.

==== Out ====
Long-serving midfielder Tomáš Berger left the club to join local rivals Bohemians 1905. Goalkeeper David Tetour, forward Jakub Mareš, defenders Josip Jurendić and Kaspars Gorkšs, as well as midfielder Marek Hlinka also left the club in the summer.

Three strikers left Dukla in the middle of the season: Spanish striker Néstor Albiach left to join Sparta Prague having scored five league goals in the season so far, French forward Jean-David Beauguel joined league rivals Zlín, while Congolese Budge Manzia joined second-tier side Olomouc. Bosnian midfielder Aldin Čajić departed for Turkish side Elazığspor. Slovak midfielder Jakub Považanec transferred to Jablonec. Slovak goalkeeper Lukáš Hroššo left for Slovak side Nitra, having kept two clean sheets in nine league matches. Ondřej Vrzal joined Bohemians 1905 on loan, while Ladislav Vopat was loaned to České Budějovice.

== Management and coaching staff ==
Position	Name
Manager	Jaroslav Šilhavý (until 5 September 2016); Jaroslav Hynek (from 5 September 2016)
Coach	Jiří Chytrý (until 5 September 2016); Pavel Drsek (from 5 September 2016)
Coach	Jaroslav Hynek (until 5 September 2016)
Goalkeeping Coach	Milan Veselý (until 5 September 2016); Tomáš Obermajer (from 5 September 2016)
Fitness Coach	Lukáš Stránský
Team Leader	Petr Malý
Masseur	Radek Havala, Jaroslav Šefl
Doctor	Ladislav Šindelář
Custodian	Jan Švestka

== Statistics ==
=== Home attendance ===
The club had the lowest average attendance in the league.

Competition	Average Attendance	Games
Czech First League	2,199	15
Cup	0	0
Average	2,199	15

== Czech First League ==
=== Results by round ===
Round	1	2	3	4	5	6	7	8	9	10	11	12	13	14	15	16	17	18	19	20	21	22	23	24	25	26	27	28	29	30
Ground	H	A	H	A	H	A	H	H	A	H	A	H	A	H	A	H	A	H	A	H	A	A	H	A	H	A	H	A	H	A
Result	L	D	W	L	L	D	W	W	L	D	D	L	L	L	W	L	W	D	L	W	W	D	L	L	W	L	W	D	W	W
Position	11	10	8	11	13	12	10	6	7	8	9	10	12	14	10	11	9	9	10	9	9	9	10	10	8	10	8	8	7	7

Source: fortunaliga.cz
A = Away; H = Home; W = Win; D = Draw; L = Loss

=== Results summary ===
Overall								Home						Away					
Pld	W	D	L	GF	GA	GD	Pts	W	D	L	GF	GA	GD	W	D	L	GF	GA	GD
30	11	7	12	39	35	+4	40	7	2	6	24	16	+8	4	5	6	15	19	−4

Source: fortunaliga.cz

=== League table ===
Pos	Team	Pld	W	D	L	GF	GA	GD	Pts	Qualification or relegation
5	Teplice	30	13	9	8	38	25	+13	48	
6	Fastav Zlín	30	11	8	11	34	35	−1	41	Qualification for the Europa League group stage (Note: Fastav Zlín qualified for the Europa League group stage by winning the 2016–17 Czech Cup.)
7	Dukla Prague	30	11	7	12	39	35	+4	40	
8	Jablonec	30	9	12	9	43	38	+5	39 (Note: Head-to-head record: Slovan 1–1 Jablonec, Jablonec 4–0 Slovan.)	
9	Slovan Liberec	30	10	9	11	31	28	+3	39	

Source: Fortuna liga, Soccerway
Rules for classification: 1) Points; 2) Head-to-head points; 3) Head-to-head goal difference; 4) Head-to-head goals scored; 5) Goal difference; 6) Goals scored; 7) Play-off (only if deciding champion, UEFA competitions, or relegation); 8) Draw.

=== Matches ===
==== July ====
29 July 2016 Round 1	Dukla Prague	0 – 1	Teplice	Prague
		Report	46' Potočný	Stadium: Stadion Juliska; Attendance: 2,508; Referee: Hrubeš

==== August ====
6 August 2016 Round 2	Slovácko	2 – 2	Dukla Prague	Uherské Hradiště
	Košút 78'; Zajíc 90'	Report	30' Olayinka; 62' (pen.) Néstor	Stadium: Městský fotbalový stadion Miroslava Valenty; Attendance: 3,652; Referee: Královec

14 August 2016 Round 3	Dukla Prague	3 – 0	Hradec Králové	Prague
	Smejkal 5'; Néstor 75' (pen.); Preisler 86'	Report		Stadium: Stadion Juliska; Attendance: 1,415; Referee: Julínek

20 August 2016 Round 4	Karviná	2 – 1	Dukla Prague	Karviná
	Dreksa 57'; Galuška 85'	Report	90' Hanousek	Stadium: Městský stadion Attendance: 4,126; Referee: Zelinka

28 August 2016 Round 5	Dukla Prague	0 – 2	Sparta Prague	Prague
		Report	58', 78' Frýdek	Stadium: Stadion Juliska; Attendance: 6,243; Referee: Proske

==== September ====
11 September 2016 Round 6	Jablonec	1 – 1	Dukla Prague	Jablonec nad Nisou
	Mihálik 52'	Report	14' Považanec	Stadium: Stadion Střelnice; Attendance: 2,048; Referee: Franěk

17 September 2016 Round 7	Dukla Prague	4 – 1	Bohemians 1905	Prague
	Dostál 23' (o.g.); Považanec 66'; Kušnír 80'; Néstor 90'	Report	13' Mašek	Stadium: Stadion Juliska; Attendance: 3,147; Referee: Příhoda

24 September 2016 Round 8	Dukla Prague	4 – 2	Zbrojovka Brno	Prague
	Beauguel 2'; Štetina 11', 69'; Juroška 63'	Report	37', 46' Škoda	Stadium: Stadion Juliska; Attendance: 1,432; Referee: Macháček

==== October ====
1 October 2016 Round 9	Mladá Boleslav	1 – 0	Dukla Prague	Mladá Boleslav
	Klobása 84'	Report		Stadium: Městský stadion Attendance: 3,789; Referee: Julínek

15 October 2016 Round 10	Dukla Prague	0 – 0	Liberec	Prague
		Report		Stadium: Stadion Juliska; Attendance: 1,631; Referee: Zelinka

21 October 2016 Round 11	Vysočina Jihlava	1 – 1	Dukla Prague	Jihlava
	Zoubele 38'	Report	71' Olayinka	Stadium: Stadion v Jiráskově ulici Attendance: 2,903; Referee: Berka

30 October 2016 Round 12	Dukla Prague	0 – 1	Viktoria Plzeň	Prague
		Report	18' Hořava	Stadium: Stadion Juliska; Attendance: 2,782; Referee: Jílek

==== November ====
5 November 2016 Round 13	Příbram	3 – 1	Dukla Prague	Příbram
	Brandner 16'; Pilík 65', 68'	Report	13' Néstor	Stadium: Na Litavce; Attendance: 1,286; Referee: Orel

18 November 2016 Round 14	Dukla Prague	1 – 2	Slavia Prague	Prague
	Čajić 45'	Report	53' Mešanović; 63' Škoda	Stadium: Stadion Juliska; Attendance: 5,273; Referee: Královec

26 November 2016 Round 15	Zlín	0 – 1	Dukla Prague	Zlín
		Report	8' Olayinka	Stadium: Letná Stadion; Attendance: 4,589; Referee: Julínek

==== December ====
4 December 2016 Round 16	Dukla Prague	2 – 3	Slovácko	Prague
	Néstor 12'; Olayinka 43'	Report	30' Tetteh; 80' Koné; 82' Zajíc	Stadium: Stadion Juliska; Attendance: 542; Referee: Franěk

==== February ====
19 February 2017 Round 17	Hradec Králové	0 – 2	Dukla Prague	Hradec Králové
		Report	67' Podaný; 90' Holenda	Stadium: Všesportovní stadion Attendance: 2,122; Referee: Příhoda

25 February 2017 Round 18	Dukla Prague	0 – 0	Karviná	Prague
		Report		Stadium: Stadion Juliska; Attendance: 1,613; Referee: Marek

==== March ====
4 March 2017 Round 19	Sparta Prague	1 – 0	Dukla Prague	Prague
	Šural 5'	Report		Stadium: Generali Arena; Attendance: 8,936; Referee: Hrubeš

11 March 2017 Round 20	Dukla Prague	1 – 0	Jablonec	Prague
	Mustedanagić 2'	Report		Stadium: Stadion Juliska; Attendance: 1,458; Referee: Matějček

19 March 2017 Round 21	Bohemians 1905	1 – 2	Dukla Prague	Prague
	Marković 1'	Report	54' Holenda; 80' Bezpalec	Stadium: Ďolíček; Attendance: 4,202; Referee: Franěk

==== April ====
1 April 2017 Round 22	Zbrojovka Brno	0 – 0	Dukla Prague	Brno
		Report		Stadium: Městský fotbalový stadion Srbská; Attendance: 3,216; Referee: Ginzel

7 April 2017 Round 23	Dukla Prague	1 – 2	Mladá Boleslav	Prague
	Olayinka 48'	Report	45' Železník; 57' (o.g.) Podaný	Stadium: Stadion Juliska; Attendance: 1,291; Referee: Severýn

16 April 2017 Round 24	Liberec	3 – 1	Dukla Prague	Liberec
	Mikula 21'; Kerbr 81'; Kouřil 89'	Report	74' Olayinka	Stadium: Stadion u Nisy; Attendance: 3,712; Referee: Julínek

21 April 2017 Round 25	Dukla Prague	4 – 1	Jihlava	Prague
	Kušnír 76'; Milošević 18', 54'; Holenda 29'	Report	5' Hronek	Stadium: Stadion Juliska; Attendance: 1,032; Referee: Jílek

29 April 2017 Round 26	Viktoria Plzeň	2 – 0	Dukla Prague	Plzeň
	Petržela 21'; Bakoš 25' (pen.)	Report		Stadium: Doosan Arena; Attendance: 10,329; Referee: Franěk

==== May ====
5 May 2017 Round 27	Dukla Prague	3 – 1	Příbram	Prague
	Holenda 12', 62'; Bilovský 90'	Report	36' Suchan	Stadium: Stadion Juliska; Attendance: 1,264; Referee: Marek

13 May 2017 Round 28	Slavia Prague	2 – 2	Dukla Prague	Prague
	Mešanović 17'; Barák 69' (pen.)	Report	30' Koreš; 80' Edmond	Stadium: Eden Arena; Attendance: 13,974; Referee: Příhoda

20 May 2017 Round 29	Dukla Prague	1 – 0	Zlín	Prague
	Holenda 58'	Report		Stadium: Stadion Juliska; Attendance: 1,352; Referee: Nenadál

27 May 2017 Round 30	Teplice	0 – 1	Dukla Prague	Teplice
		Report	90' Preisler	Stadium: Na Stínadlech; Attendance: 10,125; Referee: Houdek

== Cup ==
As a First League team, Dukla entered the Cup at the second round stage. In the second round, Dukla faced Bohemian Football League side Převýšov, winning 3–0 away from home. The third round match against third-tier side FC Velké Meziříčí resulted in a 2–1 win for Dukla as the visiting team.

In the fourth round, Dukla faced fellow First League team MFK Karviná, again away from home. 1–1 at full time, the game entered extra time, where each team scored once more. Karviná prevailed 4–2 in the ensuing penalty shootout to end Dukla's cup run for another season.

10 August 2016 Second Round	SK Převýšov	0 – 3	Dukla Prague	Převýšov
		Report	6' Olayinka; 54' Hanousek; 81' Kovaľ

21 September 2016 Third Round	FC Velké Meziříčí	1 – 2	Dukla Prague	Velké Meziříčí
	Demeter 65' (pen.)	Report	62' Milošević; 69' (pen.) Hanousek	Attendance: 1,620; Referee: Marek

30 November 2016 Fourth Round	MFK Karviná	2 – 2 (4–2 p)	Dukla Prague	Karviná
	Panák 57'; Janečka 115'	Report	67' Edmond; 118' Považanec	Stadium: Městský stadion Attendance: 1,072; Referee: Dubravský
