= 2018–19 FK Dukla Prague season =

Dukla Prague
2018–19 season
- Chairman: Michal Prokeš
- Manager: Pavel Drsek (until 7 September 2018); Roman Skuhravý (from 7 September 2018)
- Stadium: Stadion Juliska
- Czech First League: 16th (relegated)
- Czech Cup: Fourth Round
- Top goalscorer: League: Uroš Đuranović (6); All: Uroš Đuranović (6)
- Highest home attendance: 7,765 v Slavia Prague (6 April 2019)
- Lowest home attendance: League: 654 v Slovácko (18 May 2019); Cup: 374 v Teplice (16 November 2018)
- Average home league attendance: 2,682
Home colours	Away colours

The 2018–19 season was Dukla Prague's eighth consecutive season in the Czech First League and culminated in their relegation. The club made the worst start ever by any club in the first league, losing seven consecutive matches at the beginning of the season under Pavel Drsek, who was replaced in September 2018 by Roman Skuhravý.

== Players ==
=== Squad information ===
As of January 2019.

Note: Flags indicate national team as defined under FIFA eligibility rules; some limited exceptions apply. Players may hold more than one non-FIFA nationality.

No.	Pos.	Nation	Player
1	GK	CZE	Filip Rada
3	MF	CZE	Tomáš Kott
5	MF	CZE	Marek Hanousek
6	MF	CIV	Mohamed Doumbia
8	DF	CZE	Daniel Kozma
9	FW	CZE	Jan Holenda
10	FW	ESP	Pablo González
13	MF	CZE	Štěpán Krunert
14	DF	SRB	Ivan Ostojić
15	MF	CZE	Daniel Tetour
18	DF	CZE	Daniel Souček

No.	Pos.	Nation	Player
16	MF	SVK	Róbert Kovaľ
19	MF	CZE	Lukáš Holík
20	DF	SRB	Branislav Milošević
21	DF	CZE	David Douděra
23	DF	MNE	Uroš Đuranović
25	MF	CZE	Michal Bezpalec
26	MF	SVK	Samuel Dancák
27	FW	CZE	Vojtěch Hadaščok
29	GK	SVK	Matúš Hruška
39	DF	CZE	Jakub Podaný
44	DF	SVK	Ján Ďurica

=== Transfers ===
==== In ====
Dukla signed four players permanently in the summer; as well as midfielder Štěpán Krunert joining from Bohemians 1905, three defenders arrived: Dávid Bobál signed from Budapest Honvéd FC, Martin Chlumecký arrived from Liberec, and Daniel Souček joined from Slavia Prague. Midfielder David Breda and forward Ondřej Štursa joined on loan from Jablonec and Viktoria Plzen respectively. Defenders Ján Ďurica and Nikola Raspopović joined in September 2018.

In the winter break, Spanish midfielder Pablo González joined the club from Salamanca. Czech striker Vojtěch Hadaščok and Czech defender Daniel Kozma also joined the club. Lukáš Holík and Róbert Kovaľ returned to Dukla for the second half of the season after their loans expired. Samuel Dancák returned from his loan ahead of schedule to join Dukla for the second half of the season.

==== Out ====
In the summer, defenders Martin Jiránek and Ondřej Kušnír, and midfielder Štěpán Koreš left Dukla after the expiry of their contracts. Mario Holek and Néstor Albiach returned to Sparta Prague after their loans at Dukla expired. Dominik Preisler joined FC Vysočina Jihlava on loan, while Lukáš Holík was loaned to his previous club, Zlín. Samuel Dancák went out on a season-long loan to Olympia Radotín.

Striker Ivan Schranz and midfielder Frederik Bilovský left in the mid-season break to join AEL Limassol and FC Nitra respectively. Defender Dávid Bobál left after the expiry of his contract. David Breda and Ondřej Štursa returned to their parent clubs after the expiry of their loans. David Bezdička left to join Teplice on loan, while Martin Chlumecký was loaned to FC Vysočina Jihlava.

== Management and coaching staff ==
Position	Name
Manager	Pavel Drsek (until 7 September 2018); Roman Skuhravý (from 7 September 2018)
Coach	Richard Polák
Coach	Tomáš Kulvajt
Goalkeeping Coach	Tomáš Obermajer
Fitness Coach	Michal Dragijský
Team Leader	Petr Malý
Masseur	Radek Havala, Jakub Výmola
Doctor	Ladislav Šindelář
Physiotherapist	Petr Routner
Custodian	Jan Švestka

== Statistics ==
=== Home attendance ===
The club had the lowest average attendance in the league.

Competition	Average Attendance	Games
Czech First League	2,682	17
Cup	374	1
Average	2,554	18

== Czech First League ==
=== Regular season ===
==== Results by round ====
Round	1	2	3	4	5	6	7	8	9	10	11	12	13	14	15	16	17	18	19	20	21	22	23	24	25	26	27	28	29	30
Ground	H	A	H	A	H	A	A	H	A	H	A	H	A	H	A	H	A	H	A	H	H	A	H	A	H	A	H	A	H	A
Result	L	L	L	L	L	L	L	W	L	D	W	W	L	L	D	W	D	L	L	D	L	L	L	L	W	L	L	L	D	L
Position	14	14	16	16	16	16	16	16	16	16	16	15	15	16	16	15	15	16	16	16	16	16	16	16	15	16	16	16	16	16

Source: fortunaliga.cz
A = Away; H = Home; W = Win; D = Draw; L = Loss

==== Results summary ====
Overall								Home						Away					
Pld	W	D	L	GF	GA	GD	Pts	W	D	L	GF	GA	GD	W	D	L	GF	GA	GD
30	5	5	20	25	62	−37	20	4	3	8	18	31	−13	1	2	12	7	31	−24

Source: fortunaliga.cz

==== League table ====
Pos	Team	Pld	W	D	L	GF	GA	GD	Pts	Qualification or relegation
12	Slovácko	30	10	4	16	32	45	−13	34	Qualification for the relegation group
13	Opava	30	9	6	15	39	49	−10	33	Qualification for the relegation group
14	Příbram	30	8	7	15	33	63	−30	31	Qualification for the relegation group
15	Karviná	30	8	5	17	39	53	−14	29	Qualification for the relegation group
16	Dukla Prague	30	5	5	20	25	62	−37	20	Qualification for the relegation group

Source: Fortuna liga, Soccerway
Rules for classification: 1) Points; 2) Head-to-head points; 3) Head-to-head goal difference; 4) Head-to-head goals scored; 5) Goal difference; 6) Goals scored; 7) Fair-play ranking; 8) Draw.

==== Matches ====
20 July 2018 1	Dukla Prague	1–3	Viktoria Plzeň	Prague
18:30 CEST (UTC+2)	Douděra 7'	Report	Hořava 69'; Podaný 71' (o.g.); Krmenčík 88' (pen.)	Stadium: Stadion Juliska; Attendance: 5,039; Referee: Pavel Franěk

29 July 2018 2	Teplice	5–2	Dukla Prague	Teplice
15:00 CEST (UTC+2)	Vaněček 19', 80'; Vondrášek 38'; Hora 50', 56'	Report	Schranz 66'; Holík 89'	Stadium: Na Stínadlech; Attendance: 3,116; Referee: Martin Nenadál

6 August 2018 3	Dukla Prague	0–1	Bohemians 1905	Prague
18:00 CEST (UTC+2)		Report	Chlumecký 25' (o.g.)	Stadium: Stadion Juliska; Attendance: 5,262; Referee: Miroslav Zelinka

11 August 2018 4	Příbram	4–0	Dukla Prague	Příbram
17:00 CEST (UTC+2)	Skácel 53'; Slepička 55'; Matoušek 78'; Fantiš 79'	Report		Stadium: Na Litavce; Attendance: 4,156; Referee: Jiří Houdek

17 August 2018 5	Dukla Prague	1–2	Slovácko	Prague
18:30 CEST (UTC+2)	Schranz 15' (pen.)	Report	Chlumecký 13' (o.g.), 90' (o.g.)	Stadium: Stadion Juliska; Attendance: 1,287; Referee: Jan Jílek

25 August 2018 6	Baník Ostrava	2–0	Dukla Prague	Ostrava
17:00 CEST (UTC+2)	Šašinka 12'; Diop 43'	Report		Stadium: Městský Stadion; Attendance: 10,405; Referee: Jan Machálek

31 August 2018 7	Sparta Prague	2–0	Dukla Prague	Prague
18:30 CEST (UTC+2)	Tetteh 45'; Kanga 82'	Report		Stadium: Generali Arena; Attendance: 9,824; Referee: Ondřej Pechanec

16 September 2018 8	Dukla Prague	2–0	Slovan Liberec	Prague
15:00 CEST (UTC+2)	Đuranović 62'; Schranz 88' (pen.)	Report		Stadium: Stadion Juliska; Attendance: 2,376; Referee: Pavel Franěk

22 September 2018 9	Sigma Olomouc	1–0	Dukla Prague	Olomouc
15:00 CEST (UTC+2)	Jemelka 33'	Report		Stadium: Andrův stadion Attendance: 2,924; Referee: Pavel Orel

29 September 2018 10	Dukla Prague	1–1	Fastav Zlín	Prague
15:00 CEST (UTC+2)	Tetour 19'	Report	Beauguel 48'	Stadium: Stadion Juliska; Attendance: 1,831; Referee: Ondřej Lerch

7 October 2018 11	Karviná	0–2	Dukla Prague	Karviná
15:00 CEST (UTC+2)		Report	Ďurica 64'; Bilovský 90'	Stadium: Městský stadion Attendance: 3,612; Referee: Petr Ardeleánu

21 October 2018 12	Dukla Prague	1–0	Opava	Prague
15:00 CEST (UTC+2)	Ďurica 89'	Report		Stadium: Stadion Juliska; Attendance: 3,144; Referee: Pavel Královec

29 October 2018 13	Slavia Prague	4–1	Dukla Prague	Prague
18:00 CET (UTC+1)	Coufal 14'; Stoch 21', 85'; Olayinka 50'	Report	Schranz 66' (pen.)	Stadium: Eden Arena; Attendance: 11,108; Referee: Miroslav Zelinka

3 November 2018 14	Dukla Prague	2–6	Jablonec	Prague
17:00 CET (UTC+1)	Đuranović 59'; Podaný 74'	Report	Masopust 9'; Doležal 14'; Trávník 21' (pen.); Acosta 54'; Hovorka 65'; Kratochvíl 86'	Stadium: Stadion Juliska; Attendance: 1,626; Referee: Martin Nenadál

9 November 2018 15	Mladá Boleslav	0–0	Dukla Prague	Mladá Boleslav
18:00 CET (UTC+1)		Report		Stadium: Městský Stadion; Attendance: 1,683; Referee: Ondřej Berka

23 November 2018 16	Dukla Prague	1–0	Teplice	Prague
18:00 CET (UTC+1)	Đuranović 17'	Report		Stadium: Stadion Juliska; Attendance: 728; Referee: Ondřej Ginzel

2 December 2018 17	Bohemians 1905	0–0	Dukla Prague	Prague
15:00 CET (UTC+1)		Report		Stadium: Ďolíček; Attendance: 3,101; Referee: Jan Jílek

7 December 2018 18	Dukla Prague	1–2	Příbram	Prague
18:00 CET (UTC+1)	Đuranović 56'	Report	Rezek 69' (pen.); Fantiš 77'	Stadium: Stadion Juliska; Attendance: 879; Referee: Petr Ardeleánu

15 December 2018 19	Slovácko	1–0	Dukla Prague	Uherské Hradiště
15:00 CET (UTC+1)	Zajíc 12'	Report		Stadium: Městský fotbalový stadion Miroslava Valenty; Attendance: 3,112; Referee: Pavel Franěk

8 February 2019 20	Dukla Prague	1–1	Baník Ostrava	Prague
18:00 CET (UTC+1)	Podaný 14'	Report	Kuzmanović 31'	Stadium: Stadion Juliska; Attendance: 2,863; Referee: Karel Hrubeš

18 February 2019 21	Dukla Prague	2–3	Sparta Prague	Prague
18:00 CET (UTC+1)	Milošević 3'; Plechatý 56' (o.g.)	Report	Kanga 12'; Zahustel 64'; Tetteh 81'	Stadium: Stadion Juliska; Attendance: 6,122; Referee: Pavel Královec

22 February 2019 22	Slovan Liberec	2–0	Dukla Prague	Liberec
18:00 CET (UTC+1)	Hybš 60'; Kozák 88'	Report		Stadium: Stadion u Nisy; Attendance: 2,777; Referee: Ondřej Pechanec

2 March 2019 23	Dukla Prague	0–4	Sigma Olomouc	Prague
15:00 CET (UTC+1)		Report	Zahradníček 35'; Kalvach 41', 90'; Nešpor 86'	Stadium: Stadion Juliska; Attendance: 1,413; Referee: Ondřej Berka

9 March 2019 24	Fastav Zlín	2–1	Dukla Prague	Zlín
15:00 CET (UTC+1)	Ostojić 21' (o.g.); Poznar 90' (pen.)	Report	Hadaščok 29'	Stadium: Letná Stadion; Attendance: 3,164; Referee: Zbyněk Proske

15 March 2019 25	Dukla Prague	2–1	Karviná	Prague
18:00 CET (UTC+1)	Đuranović 2' (pen.); Milošević 5'	Report	Wágner 32'	Stadium: Stadion Juliska; Attendance: 1,123; Referee: Pavel Julínek

30 March 2019 26	Opava	2–0	Dukla Prague	Opava
15:00 CET (UTC+1)	Smola 6'; Stáňa 72'	Report		Stadium: Stadion v Městských sadech Attendance: 4,062; Referee: Pavel Orel

6 April 2019 27	Dukla Prague	1–5	Slavia Prague	Prague
19:00 CEST (UTC+2)	Doudera 77'	Report	Masopust 13'; Stoch 18'; Hušbauer 22', 54'; Souček 90'	Stadium: Stadion Juliska; Attendance: 7,765; Referee: Pavel Franěk

14 April 2019 28	Jablonec	2–1	Dukla Prague	Jablonec nad Nisou
15:30 CEST (UTC+2)	Chramosta 41'; Hübschman 58'	Report	Holík 22'	Stadium: Stadion Střelnice; Attendance: 2,385; Referee: Ondřej Ginzel

21 April 2019 29	Dukla Prague	2–2	Mladá Boleslav	Prague
17:00 CEST (UTC+2)	Đuranović 79'; Tetour 88'	Report	Komlichenko 25'; Mašek 75'	Stadium: Stadion Juliska; Attendance: 769; Referee: Jiří Houdek

27 April 2019 30	Viktoria Plzeň	4–0	Dukla Prague	Plzeň
17:00 CEST (UTC+2)	Procházka 6'; Kopic 36', 40'; Hořava 90'	Report		Stadium: Doosan Arena; Attendance: 8,104; Referee: Milan Matějček

=== Relegation group ===
==== League table ====
Pos	Team	Pld	W	D	L	GF	GA	GD	Pts	Qualification or relegation
11	Slovácko	35	13	6	16	43	47	−4	45	
12	Opava	35	12	7	16	47	57	−10	43	
13	Bohemians 1905	35	9	13	13	33	43	−10	40	
14	Příbram (O)	35	11	7	17	43	73	−30	40	Qualification for the relegation play-offs
15	Karviná (O)	35	9	5	21	42	58	−16	32	Qualification for the relegation play-offs
16	Dukla Prague (R)	35	5	7	23	30	72	−42	22	Relegation to FNL

Source: Fortuna liga, Soccerway
Rules for classification: 1) Points; 2) Head-to-head points; 3) Head-to-head goal difference; 4) Head-to-head goals scored; 5) Goal difference; 6) Goals scored; 7) Fair-play ranking; 8) Draw.
(O) Play-off winners; (R) Relegated

==== Matches ====
3 May 2019 31	Dukla Prague	1–1	Bohemians 1905	Prague
	Tetour 69'	Report	83' Hůlka	Stadium: Stadion Juliska; Attendance: 2,714; Referee: Lerch

11 May 2019 32	Opava	3–2	Dukla Prague	Opava
	Svozil 43'; Zavadil 48'; Jurečka 65'	Report	51' Holenda; 87' Milošević	Stadium: Stadion v Městských sadech Attendance: 3,241; Referee: Pechanec

14 May 2019 33	Karviná	3–0	Dukla Prague	Karviná
	Wágner 22', 79'; Guba 42'	Report		Stadium: Městský stadion Attendance: 1,942; Referee: Houdek

18 May 2019 34	Dukla Prague	0–0	Slovácko	Prague
		Report		Stadium: Stadion Juliska; Attendance: 654; Referee: Adámková

25 May 2019 35	Příbram	3–2	Dukla Prague	Příbram
	Keita 35'; Matoušek 60' (pen.), 65' (pen.)	Report	14' Krunert; 57' Hadaščok	Stadium: Na Litavce; Attendance: 1,266; Referee: Zelinka

== Czech Cup ==
As a First League team, Dukla entered the Cup at the second round stage. In the second round, Dukla travelled to Bohemian Football League side Písek, Dukla winning 2–0 with both goals coming in the first half of the match. The third round match was away against Viktoria Žižkov of the Czech National Football League. The game was decided by Frederik Bilovský's 81st-minute goal. In the fourth round, Dukla hosted league rivals Teplice and lost 3–1, concluding their cup run for another season.

4 September 2018 Second round	Písek	0–2	Dukla Prague	Písek
		Report	25' Schranz; 38' Breda	Attendance: 1,580; Referee: Matějček

12 October 2018 Third round	Viktoria Žižkov	0–1	Dukla Prague	Prague
		Report	81' Bilovský	Stadium: FK Viktoria Stadion; Attendance: 1,121; Referee: Berka

16 November 2018 Fourth round	Dukla Prague	1–3	Teplice	Prague
	Brandner 86'	Report	11', 45', 64' Jindráček	Stadium: Stadion Juliska; Attendance: 374; Referee: Královec
