= 2015–16 FK Dukla Prague season =

Dukla Prague
2015–16 season
- Chairman: Michal Prokeš
- Manager: Luboš Kozel
- Stadium: Stadion Juliska
- Czech First League: 10th
- Czech Cup: Quarter-finals
- Top goalscorer: League: Tomáš Berger (10); All: Tomáš Berger (11)
- Highest home attendance: 7,753 v Slavia Prague (3 April 2016)
- Lowest home attendance: League: 831 v Slovácko (14 May 2016); Cup: 382 v Jablonec (3 March 2016)
- Average home league attendance: 2,642
Home colours	Away colours

The 2015–16 season was Dukla Prague's fifth consecutive season in the Czech First League.

== Players ==
=== Squad information ===
As of 22 September 2015.

Note: Flags indicate national team as defined under FIFA eligibility rules; some limited exceptions apply. Players may hold more than one non-FIFA nationality.

No.	Pos.	Nation	Player
1	GK	CZE	Filip Rada
2	DF	CZE	Michal Jeřábek
5	MF	CZE	Marek Hanousek
7	MF	SVK	Jakub Považanec
8	MF	BIH	Aldin Čajić
9	FW	FRA	Jean-David Beauguel
10	FW	ESP	Néstor Albiach
11	FW	CZE	Michal Krmenčík (on loan from Viktoria Plzeň)
13	FW	CZE	Tomáš Berger
15	MF	CZE	Daniel Tetour
16	MF	SVK	Róbert Kovaľ

No.	Pos.	Nation	Player
17	DF	CRO	Josip Jurendić
19	DF	SVK	Lukáš Štetina
20	DF	SRB	Branislav Milošević
23	DF	CZE	Ondřej Vrzal
26	FW	CZE	Jakub Mareš
27	DF	CZE	Dominik Preisler
29	GK	CZE	David Tetour
30	GK	SVK	Martin Chudý
31	DF	LAT	Kaspars Gorkšs
32	FW	CZE	Tomáš Přikryl (on loan from Sparta Prague)

== Management and coaching staff ==
Position	Name
Manager	Luboš Kozel
Coach	Jan Suchopárek
Goalkeeping Coach	Tomáš Obermajer
Fitness Coach	Antonín Čepek
Team Leader	Jiří Blažek
Club Physio	Pavel Hrásky, Petr Král
Masseur	Radek Havala
Doctor	Ladislav Šindelář
Custodian	Jan Švestka

== Statistics ==
=== Appearances and goals ===
- Start and Substitute appearances.

No.	Pos	Nat	Player	Total		League		Cup	
No.	Pos	Nat	Player	Apps	Goals	Apps	Goals	Apps	Goals
1	GK	(Czech Republic) CZE	Filip Rada	26	0	26+0	0	0+0	0
2	DF	(Czech Republic) CZE	Michal Jeřábek	17	1	10+3	0	4+0	1
4	DF	(Czech Republic) CZE	Matěj Hanousek	0	0	0+0	0	0+0	0
5	MF	(Czech Republic) CZE	Marek Hanousek	34	3	29+0	1	5+0	2
7	FW	(Slovakia) SVK	Jakub Považanec	36	0	29+1	0	2+4	0
8	FW	(Bosnia and Herzegovina) BIH	Aldin Čajić	30	2	17+8	2	3+2	0
9	DF	(France) FRA	Jean-David Beauguel	24	1	8+12	0	2+2	1
10	FW	(Spain) ESP	Néstor Albiach	19	3	10+8	3	1+0	0
11	FW	(Czech Republic) CZE	Michal Krmenčík	16	7	8+4	5	3+1	2
13	MF	(Czech Republic) CZE	Tomáš Berger	30	11	25+1	10	3+1	1
14	FW	(Czech Republic) CZE	David Bezdička	2	0	0+1	0	0+1	0
15	DF	(Czech Republic) CZE	Daniel Tetour	33	3	18+10	3	5+0	0
16	FW	(Slovakia) SVK	Róbert Kovaľ	7	1	1+1	0	5+0	1
17	FW	(Croatia) CRO	Josip Jurendić	22	0	13+4	0	5+0	0
18	FW	(Czech Republic) CZE	Václav Vašíček	10	0	4+4	0	1+1	0
19	MF	(Slovakia) SVK	Lukáš Štetina	30	3	25+0	2	5+0	1
20	FW	(Serbia) SRB	Branislav Milošević	28	0	20+4	0	3+1	0
21	FW	(Democratic Republic of the Congo) COD	Budge Manzia	10	2	5+4	2	1+0	0
22	DF	(Czech Republic) CZE	Michal Smejkal	6	0	0+5	0	1+0	0
23	DF	(Czech Republic) CZE	Ondřej Vrzal	25	5	22+1	5	2+0	0
26	DF	(Czech Republic) CZE	Jakub Mareš	29	5	18+7	4	3+1	1
27	DF	(Czech Republic) CZE	Dominik Preisler	8	0	1+4	0	2+1	0
29	GK	(Czech Republic) CZE	David Tetour	0	0	0+0	0	0+0	0
30	GK	(Slovakia) SVK	Martin Chudý	4	0	0+0	0	4+0	0
30	GK	(Slovakia) SVK	Lukáš Hroššo	6	0	4+0	0	2+0	0
31	DF	(Latvia) LAT	Kaspars Gorkšs	24	3	23+0	3	1+0	0
32	FW	(Czech Republic) CZE	Tomáš Přikryl	12	5	8+2	3	2+0	2
32	DF	(Czech Republic) CZE	Michal Breznaník	7	0	5+1	0	1+0	0
33	FW	(Slovakia) SVK	Marek Hlinka	1	0	1+0	0	0+0	0
	MF	(Czech Republic) CZE	Michal Bezpalec	2	0	0+2	0	0+0	0
	MF	(Czech Republic) CZE	Pavel Čapek	1	0	0+0	0	0+1	0
	MF	(Czech Republic) CZE	Jan Mejdr	2	0	0+0	0	0+2	0

=== Home attendance ===
The club had the lowest average attendance in the league.

Competition	Average Attendance	Games
Czech First League	2,642	15
Cup	399	2
Average	2,378	17

== Czech First League ==
=== Results by round ===
Round	1	2	3	4	5	6	7	8	9	10	11	12	13	14	15	16	17	18	19	20	21	22	23	24	25	26	27	28	29	30
Ground	A	H	A	H	A	H	A	H	A	H	A	H	H	A	H	A	H	A	A	H	A	H	A	H	H	A	A	H	A	H
Result	L	W	D	D	L	W	D	L	D	D	D	W	L	D	W	L	W	L	W	L	L	L	D	W	L	D	D	W	D	L
Position	11	7	9	8	11	13	10	12	11	11	12	10	12	12	9	11	8	10	10	9	9	10	10	9	9	9	9	8	10	10

Source: FKDukla.cz
A = Away; H = Home; W = Win; D = Draw; L = Loss

=== Results summary ===
Overall								Home						Away					
Pld	W	D	L	GF	GA	GD	Pts	W	D	L	GF	GA	GD	W	D	L	GF	GA	GD
30	8	11	11	44	41	+3	35	7	2	6	25	13	+12	1	9	5	19	28	−9

Source: synotliga.cz

=== League table ===
Pos	Team	Pld	W	D	L	GF	GA	GD	Pts
8	Slovácko	30	12	4	14	37	51	−14	40
9	Bohemians 1905	30	8	13	9	35	37	−2	37
10	Dukla Prague	30	8	11	11	44	41	+3	35
11	Vysočina Jihlava	30	8	7	15	31	54	−23	31
12	Teplice	30	7	9	14	37	52	−15	30 (Note: Teplice ahead of Zlín on head-to-head record; Zlín–Teplice 1–2, Teplice–Zlín 2–2.)

Source: Fortuna liga, Soccerway
Rules for classification: 1) Points; 2) Head-to-head points; 3) Head-to-head goal difference; 4) Head-to-head goals scored; 5) Goal difference; 6) Goals scored; 7) Play-off (only if deciding champion, UEFA competitions, or relegation); 8) Draw.

=== Matches ===
25 July 2015 1	Slovácko	4–3	Dukla Prague	Uherské Hradiště
17:00 CEST (UTC+2)	Havlík 25'; Došek 58', 73', 87'	Report	Berger 17'; Dan. Tetour 75'; Krmenčík 89'	Stadium: Městský fotbalový stadion Miroslava Valenty; Attendance: 3,726; Referee: Zbyněk Proske

1 August 2015 2	Dukla Prague	1–0	Viktoria Plzeň	Prague
20:15 CEST (UTC+2)	Berger 77'	Report		Stadium: Stadion Juliska; Attendance: 5,182; Referee: Ondřej Lerch

10 August 2015 3	Slovan Liberec	1–1	Dukla Prague	Liberec
19:00 CEST (UTC+2)	Šural 45'	Report	Berger 63' (pen.)	Stadium: Stadion u Nisy; Attendance: 7,100; Referee: Ondřej Pechanec

15 August 2015 4	Dukla Prague	2–2	Bohemians 1905	Prague
20:15 CEST (UTC+2)	Berger 43', 44'	Report	Jindřišek 72' (pen.); Zlámal 90'	Stadium: Stadion Juliska; Attendance: 5,068; Referee: Jan Jílek

23 August 2015 5	Sparta Prague	2–0	Dukla Prague	Prague
19:15 CEST (UTC+2)	Krejčí 41'; Lafata 56'	Report		Stadium: Stadion Letná; Attendance: 9,142; Referee: Miroslav Zelinka

14 September 2015 6	Dukla Prague	4–1	Baník Ostrava	Prague
18:00 CEST (UTC+2)	Přikryl 4'; Vrzal 10'; Berger 18'; Hanousek 90'	Report	Narh 54'	Stadium: Stadion Juliska; Attendance: 2,046; Referee: Zbyněk Proske

18 September 2015 7	Vysočina Jihlava	2–2	Dukla Prague	Jihlava
18:00 CEST (UTC+2)	Mešanović 10', 81'	Report	Přikryl 71'; Krmenčík 74'	Stadium: Stadion v Jiráskově ulici Attendance: 2,893; Referee: Jiří Jech

26 September 2015 8	Dukla Prague	1–2	Zbrojovka Brno	Prague
15:30 CEST (UTC+2)	Berger 39'	Report	Řezníček 63', 73'	Stadium: Stadion Juliska; Attendance: 1,850; Referee: Pavel Orel

4 October 2015 9	Slavia Prague	1–1	Dukla Prague	Prague
14:30 CEST (UTC+2)	Škoda 63'	Report	Krmenčík 5'	Stadium: Fortuna Arena; Attendance: 10,547; Referee: Pavel Královec

16 October 2015 10	Dukla Prague	1–1	Mladá Boleslav	Prague
20:15 CEST (UTC+2)	Čajić 40'	Report	Magera 80' (pen.)	Stadium: Stadion Juliska; Attendance: 1,353; Referee: Karel Hrubeš

24 October 2015 11	Jablonec	3–3	Dukla Prague	Jablonec nad Nisou
20:15 CEST (UTC+2)	Pospíšil 30' (pen.); Doležal 79'; Wágner 90' (pen.)	Report	Krmenčík 23', 35'; Štetina 55'	Stadium: Stadion Střelnice; Attendance: 1,230; Referee: Jiří Jech

30 October 2015 12	Dukla Prague	1–0	Zlín	Prague
18:00 CET (UTC+1)	Vrzal 64'	Report		Stadium: Stadion Juliska; Attendance: 1,332; Referee: Michal Paták

7 November 2015 13	Dukla Prague	0–1	Příbram	Prague
17:00 CET (UTC+1)		Report	Hanousek 26' (o.g.)	Stadium: Stadion Juliska; Attendance: 1,521; Referee: Petr Ardeleánu

21 November 2015 14	Sigma Olomouc	0–0	Dukla Prague	Olomouc
17:00 CET (UTC+1)		Report		Stadium: Andrův stadion Attendance: 3,439; Referee: Zbyněk Proske

27 November 2015 15	Dukla Prague	4–0	Teplice	Prague
18:00 CET (UTC+1)	Čajić 40'; Gorkšs 45', 89'; Přikryl 75'	Report		Stadium: Stadion Juliska; Attendance: 1,132; Referee: Jiří Houdek

6 December 2015 16	Viktoria Plzeň	3–0	Dukla Prague	Plzeň
18:30 CET (UTC+1)	Hořava 4'; Baránek Jr. 55'; Kovařík 90'	Report		Stadium: Doosan Arena; Attendance: 9,873; Referee: Karel Hrubeš

12 February 2016 17	Dukla Prague	2–0	Slovan Liberec	Prague
18:00 CET (UTC+1)	Berger 35'; Karafiát 48' (o.g.)	Report		Stadium: Stadion Juliska; Attendance: 2,358; Referee: Miroslav Zelinka

20 February 2016 18	Bohemians 1905	1–0	Dukla Prague	Prague
14:00 CET (UTC+1)	Krch 68'	Report		Stadium: Ďolíček; Attendance: 4,872; Referee: Zbyněk Proske

6 March 2016 20	Baník Ostrava	1–2	Dukla Prague	Ostrava
15:00 CET (UTC+1)	Hrubý 17'	Report	Vrzal 26'; Berger 43'	Stadium: Městský stadion Attendance: 5,339; Referee: Jiří Houdek

12 March 2016 21	Dukla Prague	0–1	Vysočina Jihlava	Prague
17:00 CET (UTC+1)		Report	Štetina 62' (o.g.)	Stadium: Stadion Juliska; Attendance: 1,148; Referee: Martin Nenadál

19 March 2016 22	Zbrojovka Brno	3–0	Dukla Prague	Brno
15:00 CET (UTC+1)	Hyčka 1'; Buchta 44'; Škoda 65'	Report		Stadium: Městský fotbalový stadion Srbská; Attendance: 3,942; Referee: Pavel Královec

3 April 2016 23	Dukla Prague	0–1	Slavia Prague	Prague
15:00 CEST (UTC+2)		Report	Štetina 33' (o.g.)	Stadium: Stadion Juliska; Attendance: 7,753; Referee: Zbyněk Proske

9 April 2016 24	Mladá Boleslav	2–2	Dukla Prague	Mladá Boleslav
18:00 CEST (UTC+2)	Klobása 75'; Chramosta 80'	Report	Mareš 1'; Manzia 11'	Stadium: Lokotrans Aréna; Attendance: 2,564; Referee: Jiří Jech

15 April 2016 25	Dukla Prague	6–1	Jablonec	Prague
18:00 CEST (UTC+2)	Vrzal 30'; Gorkšs 33'; Dan. Tetour 36'; Mareš 43', 73'; Manzia 87'	Report	Kysela 56'	Stadium: Stadion Juliska; Attendance: 1,067; Referee: Pavel Franěk

20 April 2016 19	Dukla Prague	1–2	Sparta Prague	Prague
19:30 CEST (UTC+2)	Dan. Tetour 34'	Report	Juliš 88'; Dočkal 90' (pen.)	Stadium: Stadion Juliska; Attendance: 5,762; Referee: Tomáš Kocourek
Note: The match was originally scheduled for 29 February 2016, but was postponed due to snowfall.

24 April 2016 26	Zlín	2–2	Dukla Prague	Zlín
17:00 CEST (UTC+2)	Koreš 21'; Janíček 84'	Report	Albiach 26', 89'	Stadium: Letná Stadion; Attendance: 2,726; Referee: Jan Jílek

30 April 2016 27	Příbram	2–2	Dukla Prague	Příbram
15:00 CEST (UTC+2)	Pilík 67' (pen.); Hanousek 87' (o.g.)	Report	Mareš 33'; Albiach 54'	Stadium: Na Litavce; Attendance: 2,016; Referee: Miroslav Zelinka

6 May 2016 28	Dukla Prague	2–0	Sigma Olomouc	Prague
17:30 CEST (UTC+2)	Štetina 14'; Vrzal 52'	Report		Stadium: Stadion Juliska; Attendance: 1,228; Referee: Pavel Královec

11 May 2016 29	Teplice	1–1	Dukla Prague	Teplice
18:15 CEST (UTC+2)	Fillo 81'	Report	Berger 11'	Stadium: Na Stínadlech; Attendance: 2,421; Referee: Pavel Julínek

14 May 2016 30	Dukla Prague	0–1	Slovácko	Prague
15:30 CEST (UTC+2)		Report	Diviš 76'	Stadium: Stadion Juliska; Attendance: 831; Referee: Jan Machálek

== Cup ==
As a First League team, Dukla entered the Cup at the second round stage. In the second round, Dukla faced fourth division side Neratovice–Byškovice, winning 4–0 away from home. The third round match against FC MAS Táborsko of the second league was a closer game; goals from Lukáš Štetina and Tomáš Přikryl helped Dukla to a 2–1 away win.

In the fourth round, Dukla faced another second league team, being paired with Ústí nad Labem. Dukla won both matches of the two-legged tie by a 3–0 scoreline, going through 6–0 on aggregate. At the quarter-final stage, the home game against fellow First League team FK Jablonec finished goalless. The return leg, two weeks later, saw Jablonec win 2–1 and subsequently progress to the semi-final stage at Dukla's expense. This was the third time Jablonec had ended Dukla's cup run in five years, having previously done so in the 2010–11 and 2011–12 editions of the competition.

28 August 2015 Second Round	FK Neratovice–Byškovice	0 – 4	Dukla Prague	Neratovice
		Report	32' Přikryl; 35' Kovaľ; 45' Krmenčík; 70' Marek Hanousek	Referee: Franěk

22 September 2015 Third Round	FC MAS Táborsko	1 – 2	Dukla Prague	Sezimovo Ústí
	Ciku 86'	Report	50' Štetina; 61' Přikryl	Stadium: Sportovní areál Soukeník; Attendance: 1,256; Referee: Příhoda

20 October 2015 Fourth round, 1st Leg	FK Ústí nad Labem	0 – 3	Dukla Prague	Ústí nad Labem
		Report	16' Berger; 58' Krmenčík; 76' Marek Hanousek	Stadium: Městský stadion Attendance: 2,236; Referee: Nenadál

10 November 2015 Fourth round, 2nd Leg	Dukla Prague	3 – 0 (6 – 0 agg.)	FK Ústí nad Labem	Prague
	Jurendić 11'; Jeřábek 45+1'; Jakub Mareš 53'	Report		Stadium: Stadion Juliska; Attendance: 415; Referee: Jílek

3 March 2016 Quarter final, 1st Leg	Dukla Prague	0 – 0	FK Jablonec	Prague
		Report		Stadium: Stadion Juliska; Attendance: 382; Referee: Ardeleánu

15 March 2016 Quarter final, 2nd Leg	FK Jablonec	2 – 1 (2 – 1 agg.)	Dukla Prague	Jablonec nad Nisou
	Doležal 52', 59'	Report	53' Beauguel	Stadium: Stadion Střelnice; Attendance: 730; Referee: Příhoda
