= Michal Bezpalec =

Czech football player

Personal information
- Date of birth: 19 August 1996 (age 30)
- Place of birth: Strakonice, Czech Republic
- Height: 1.82 m (6 ft 0 in)
- Position: Defensive midfielder

Team information
- Current team: Karkonosze Jelenia Góra
- Number: 19

Youth career
- Dukla Prague

Senior career*
Years	Team	Apps	(Gls)
2016–2019	Dukla Prague	66	(1)
2019–2022	Bruk-Bet Termalica	52	(2)
2022–2023	Táborsko	15	(0)
2023	Podhale Nowy Targ	15	(0)
2023–2024	Stomil Olsztyn	27	(1)
2024–	Karkonosze Jelenia Góra	57	(1)

International career
2016–2017	Czech Republic U20	4	(0)
2017–2018	Czech Republic U21	2	(0)
- * Club domestic league appearances and goals as of 21:51, 3 June 2026 (UTC)

Michal Bezpalec (born 19 August 1996) is a Czech professional footballer who plays as a defensive midfielder for Polish club Karkonosze Jelenia Góra.

== Career ==
He scored his first Czech First League goal in a 2–1 win against Bohemians 1905 in March 2017.

== Career statistics ==
As of match played 30 May 2026

Appearances and goals by club, season and competition
Club	Season	League			National cup (Note: Includes Czech Cup, Polish Cup)		Europe		Other		Total	
Club	Season	Division	Apps	Goals	Apps	Goals	Apps	Goals	Apps	Goals	Apps	Goals
Dukla Prague	2015–16	Czech First League	2	0	0	0	—		—		2	0
Dukla Prague	2016–17	Czech First League	19	1	2	0	—		—		19	1
Dukla Prague	2017–18	Czech First League	19	0	1	0	—		—		20	0
Dukla Prague	2018–19	Czech First League	26	0	3	0	—		—		29	0
Dukla Prague	Total		66	1	6	0	0	0	0	0	72	1
Bruk-Bet Termalica	2019–20	I liga	24	1	1	0	—		—		25	1
Bruk-Bet Termalica	2020–21	I liga	20	1	1	0	—		—		21	1
Bruk-Bet Termalica	2021–22	Ekstraklasa	8	0	2	0	—		—		10	0
Bruk-Bet Termalica	Total		52	2	4	0	0	0	0	0	56	2
Táborsko	2021–22	CNFL	1	0	—		—		—		1	0
Táborsko	2022–23	CNFL	14	0	3	0	—		—		17	0
Táborsko	Total		15	0	3	0	0	0	0	0	18	0
Podhale Nowy Targ	2022–23	III liga, group IV	15	0	—		—		—		15	0
Stomil Olsztyn	2023–24	II liga	27	1	1	0	—		—		28	1
Karkonosze Jelenia Góra	2024–25	III liga, group III	31	1	—		—		—		31	1
Karkonosze Jelenia Góra	2025–26	III liga, group III	26	0	—		—		—		26	0
Karkonosze Jelenia Góra	Total		57	1	—		—		—		57	1
Career total			232	5	14	0	0	0	0	0	246	5

== Honours ==
Karkonosze Jelenia Góra

- Polish Cup (Jelenia Góra regionals): 2024–25
