= Róbert Kovaľ =

Slovak footballer

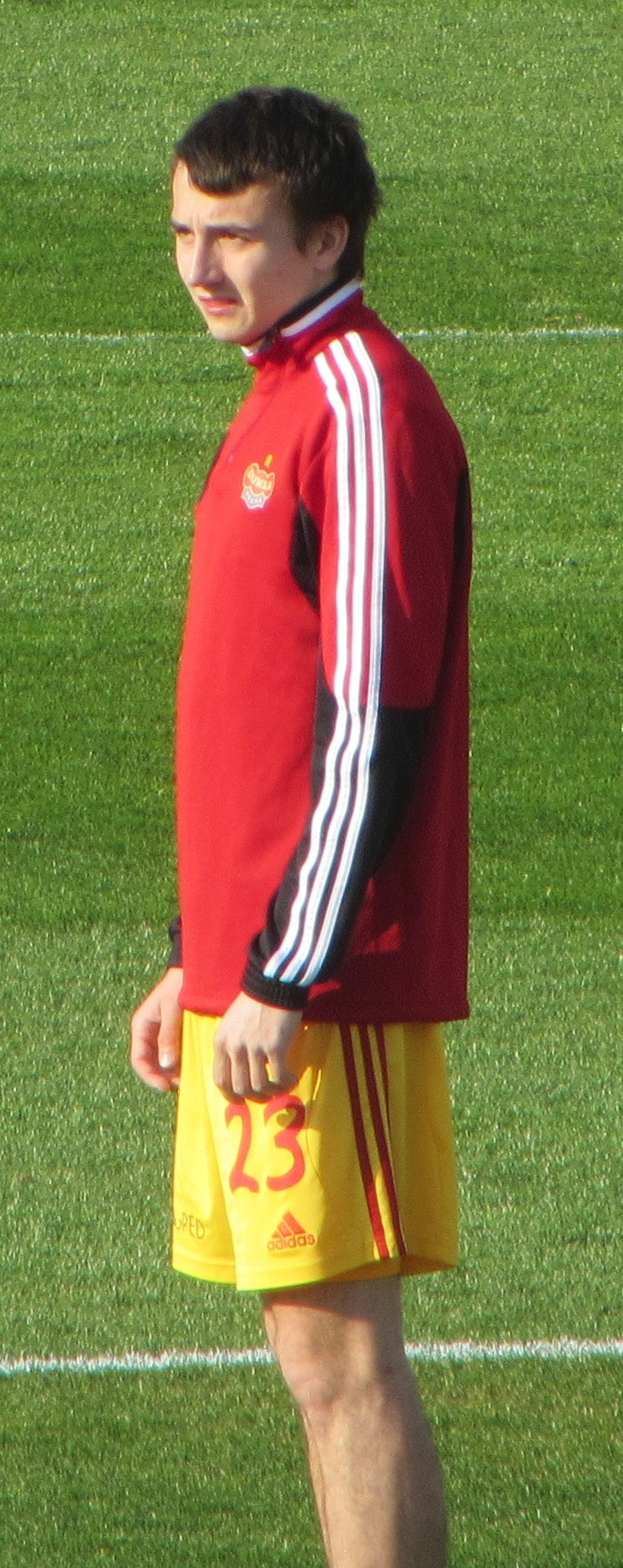

Personal information
- Full name: Róbert Kovaľ
- Date of birth: 16 January 1994 (age 32)
- Place of birth: Humenné, Slovakia
- Height: 1.72 m (5 ft 8 in)
- Position: Midfielder

Youth career
- Humenné
- Michalovce

Senior career*
Years	Team	Apps	(Gls)
2011–2013	Zemplín Michalovce	70	(8)
2014–2021	Dukla Prague	42	(3)
2018	→ Zemplín Michalovce (loan)	3	(0)
2018	→ České Budějovice (loan)	13	(2)

International career
2010–2011	Slovakia U17	4	(0)
2011–2012	Slovakia U18		
- * Club domestic league appearances and goals as of 18 July 2020

Róbert Kovaľ (born 16 January 1994) is a former Slovak football midfielder who last played for FK Dukla Prague.

== Club ==
He made his debut for MFK Zemplín Michalovce against FK Slovan Duslo Šaľa on 23 April 2011 at the age of 17.

=== FK Dukla Prague ===
He joined FK Dukla Prague in February 2014, signing a three-and-a-half-year contract. He made his professional debut for the club against SK Slavia Prague on 28 February 2014.

== Career statistics ==
As of 30 June 2017

Club	Season	League		Cup		Total	
Club	Season	Apps	Goals	Apps	Goals	Apps	Goals
Michalovce	2013–14	20	2	0	0	20	2
Dukla Prague	2013–14	6	0	1	0	7	0
Dukla Prague	2014–15	0	0	0	0	0	0
Dukla Prague	2015–16	2	0	5	1	7	1
Dukla Prague	2016–17	3	0	2	1	5	1
Dukla Prague	2017–18	5	1	2	0	7	1
Dukla Prague	2018–19	9	0	0	0	9	0
Dukla Prague	2019–20	17	2	2	1	19	3
Dukla total		42	3	12	3	54	6
Michalovce (loan)	2017–18	3	0	0	0	3	0
České Budějovice (loan)	2018–19	13	2	1	0	14	2
Total		78	7	13	3	91	10
