= David Breda (footballer, born 1996) =

Czech footballer

Personal information
- Date of birth: 4 January 1996 (age 30)
- Place of birth: Czech Republic
- Height: 1.81 m (5 ft 11 in)
- Position: Midfielder

Youth career
- Hradec Králové

Senior career*
Years	Team	Apps	(Gls)
2014–2020	Jablonec	9	(0)
2017–2018	→ Varnsdorf (loan)	13	(4)
2018	→ Dukla Prague (loan)	7	(0)
2019–2020	→ Varnsdorf (loan)	27	(8)
2020–2022	Chrudim		
2022–2023	Dukla Prague		
2022–2023	→ Sparta Kolín (loan)		
- * Club domestic league appearances and goals as of 7 July 2020

David Breda (born 4 January 1996) is a Czech football player who played for Dukla Prague. He joined Varnsdorf on loan in August 2017.
