= Štěpán Krunert =

Czech footballer

Personal information
- Full name: Štěpán Krunert
- Date of birth: 23 March 2000 (age 26)
- Height: 1.88 m (6 ft 2 in)
- Position: Midfielder

Team information
- Current team: Dukla Prague

Youth career
- Vlašim
- Benešov
- Bohemians 1905

Senior career*
Years	Team	Apps	(Gls)
2018–	Dukla Prague	43	(4)
2021	→ Teplice (loan)	17	(1)
2022	→ Vlašim (loan)	11	(0)

International career
2017–2018	Czech Republic U-18	11	(0)
2018–2019	Czech Republic U-19	4	(0)
2019	Czech Republic U-20	5	(1)
2021	Czech Republic U-21	2	(0)
- * Club domestic league appearances and goals as of 23:59, 30 June 2022 (UTC)

Štěpán Krunert (born 23 March 2000) is a Czech professional football midfielder currently playing for FK Dukla Prague.

== Career ==
He scored his first career goal in Dukla's 3–2 away loss to Příbram in the last match of the 2018–19 Czech First League.
