= Peter Olayinka =

Nigerian footballer (born 1995)

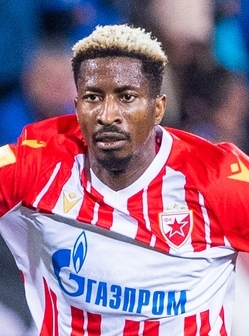
- Olayinka playing for Red Star Belgrade

Personal information
- Full name: Peter Olayinka Oladeji
- Date of birth: 18 November 1995 (age 30)
- Place of birth: Ibadan, Nigeria
- Height: 1.88 m (6 ft 2 in)
- Positions: Left winger; forward

Youth career
- 2010–2012: JB Sport FC
- 2012–2013: Bylis

Senior career*
Years	Team	Apps	(Gls)
2012–2014	Bylis	40	(0)
2013–2014	→ Yenicami (loan)	21	(8)
2014–2016	Skënderbeu	33	(16)
2016–2018	Gent	0	(0)
2016–2017	→ Dukla Prague (loan)	29	(5)
2017–2018	→ Zulte Waregem (loan)	35	(11)
2018–2023	Slavia Prague	115	(33)
2023–2025	Red Star Belgrade	46	(14)
2026	APOEL	14	(2)

International career^{‡}
2019–	Nigeria	4	(0)
- * Club domestic league appearances and goals as of 14 June 2026 ‡ National team caps and goals as of 23 January 2022

Peter Olayinka Oladeji (born 18 November 1995) is a Nigerian professional footballer who plays as a left winger or forward for Nigeria national team.

== Club career ==
=== Early career ===
Olayinka started his career with (Baba Boss) in Ibadan before in January 2012 he joined Bylis in the Kategoria Superiore, where he initially joined the club's under-19s due to being just 17 at the time. He was promoted to the senior team under Agim Canaj during the 2012–13 season, and he made his professional debut on 20 October 2012 in an Kategoria Superiore game against Luftëtari, in which he came on as an 84th-minute substitute for Jetmir Sefa in the 2–0 win. With the departure of Canaj and the arrival of Naci Şensoy as head coach in November, Olayinka received more playing time under Şensoy who showed faith in the young player. He scored his first goal on 3 February 2013 against Teuta an Albanian Cup tie that ended in a 2–2 draw. He scored again month later on 3 March against Laçi in a 3–2 away loss. He scored again in the Albanian Cup in the first leg of the semi-finals against Skënderbeu, scoring the first goal in a 1–1 draw at the Skënderbeu Stadium. He featured in 14 league games during the 2012–13 campaign without scoring, and helped his side narrowly avoid relegation to the Kategoria e Parë, starting 6 games and completing the full 90 minutes on 2 two occasions. He scored three times in the Albanian Cup in 10 appearances, as his side reached the final for the first time in their history. He started up front in the final against Laçi but was substituted off late in extra time, just before Laçi snatch the game through an Emiliano Çela winner in the 119th minute.

=== Yenicami Ağdelen ===
Following the end of the 2012–13 season he attracted clubs from both within Albania and abroad, and it was reported that Portuguese club FC Porto offered Bylis €500,000 for his services but the offer was turned down. Olayinka left the club in the summer of 2013, and asked the governing body of football FIFA to release him from his contract with the club, but Bylis also contacted FIFA, who eventually ruled in favour of the club as he was still under contract. Bylis then took up the option to renew his contract, meaning he was unable to play for another club without their permission, but in order to get around this he joined Northern Cypriot club Yenicami Ağdelen for the 2013–14 season as the North Cyprus Süper Lig is not officially recognised by FIFA. He scored 8 league goals in 21 games to help the club win the Süper Lig for the first time in 20 years. He also scored 6 times in 5 Federasyon Kupası games as his side were beaten finalists, taking his goal tally to 14 goals in 26 games for the club.

=== Skënderbeu ===
Olayinka had allegedly agreed terms with Kukësi but on 28 August 2014 he agreed terms with reigning Albanian champions Skënderbeu, and was seen as a replacement for Pero Pejić who had recently moved to Kukësi. His transfer to Skënderbeu was heavily disputed by Kukësi and its president Safet Gjici, who also appealed the move to the Albanian Football Association and reported the player to the police. Nonetheless, Olayinka joined up with the rest of the Skënderbeu squad ahead of the 2014–15 season, and he played his first game for the club in a 0–0 away draw at Apolonia on 19 September, where he played the full 90 minutes.

He returned to Albania in August before the start of the 2015–16 Kategoria Superiore, season and rejoined Skënderbeu, where he was allowed to play once again after serving his suspension.

On 12 September 2015, Olayinka scored his first league goals of 2015–16 season against newly promoted side Tërbuni, scoring both goals of 0–2 away win.

=== Gent ===
Olayinka signed a three-year deal with K.A.A. Gent for €1.1 million. He joined Czech First League side Dukla Prague on a year-long loan in July 2016.

=== Slavia Prague ===
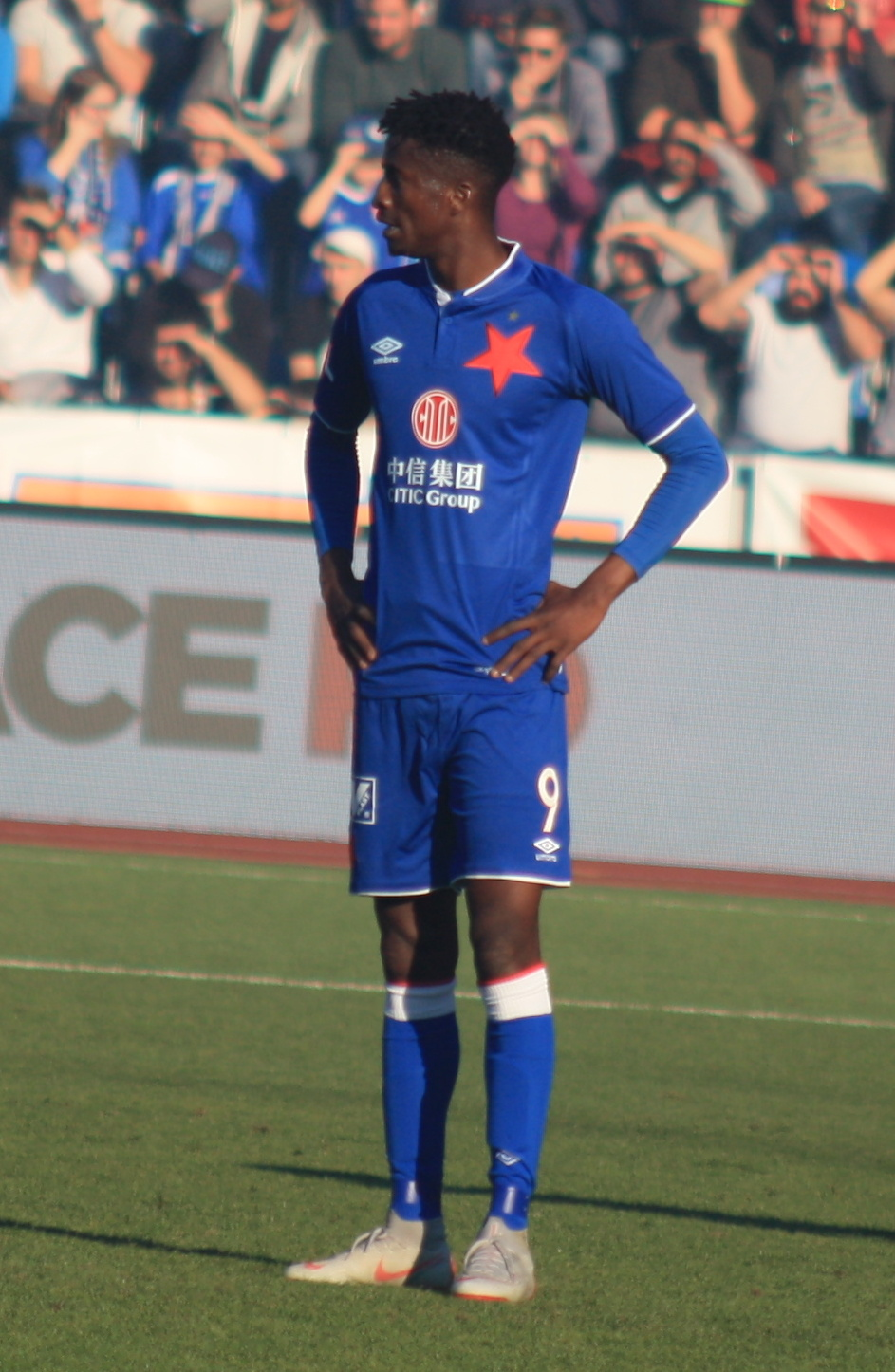
Olayinka with Slavia Prague in 2018

On 21 July 2018, Slavia Prague signed Olayinka on a four-year contract from Gent for €3,200,000.

=== Red Star Belgrade ===
In the evening of 9 January 2023, Red Star Belgrade and Olayinka agreed on the transfer, which will become active after the end of Peter's contract with Slavia Prague.

== International career ==
Because of his talent, Albanian FA made numerous attempts of making Olayinka the first African player to play for Albania national team. At that time Olayinka himself said that he was willing to play for Albania if he got the Albanian passport. However, in September 2019, he was nominated for an international friendly match between Nigeria and Brazil. Ever since 2019, he has made 4 appearances for the Nigerian national team.

== Personal life ==
In March 2021, he married Nigerian model Yetunde Barnabas.

== Career statistics ==
As of match played 26 October 2025

Appearances and goals by club, season and competition
Club	Season	League			National cup (Note: Includes Albanian Cup, Czech Cup, Belgian Cup, Serbian Cup)		Europe		Other		Total	
Club	Season	Division	Apps	Goals	Apps	Goals	Apps	Goals	Apps	Goals	Apps	Goals
Bylis	2012–13	Kategoria Superiore	14	0	10	3	—		—		24	3
Yenicami Ağdelen (loan)	2013–14	KTFF Süper Lig	21	8	5	6	—		1	1	27	15
Skënderbeu	2014–15	Kategoria Superiore	15	6	2	3	—		—		17	9
Skënderbeu	2015–16	Kategoria Superiore	18	10	3	0	6 (Note: One appearance in UEFA Champions League, five appearances in UEFA Europa League)	0	—		27	10
Skënderbeu	Total		33	16	5	3	6	0	0	0	44	19
Dukla Prague (loan)	2016–17	Czech First League	29	5	2	0	—		—		31	5
Zulte Waregem (loan)	2017–18	Belgian First Division A	34	11	1	0	4 (Note: Appearances in UEFA Europa League)	0	1 (Note: Appearance in Belgian Super Cup)	0	40	11
Slavia Prague	2018–19	Czech First League	24	6	5	0	10 (Note: One appearance in UEFA Champions League, nine appearances in UEFA Europa League)	0	—		39	6
Slavia Prague	2019–20	Czech First League	20	4	0	0	8 (Note: Appearances in UEFA Champions League)	1	1	0	29	5
Slavia Prague	2020–21	Czech First League	24	6	2	1	12 (Note: Two appearances and one goal in UEFA Champions League, ten appearances and two goals in UEFA Europa League)	3	—		38	10
Slavia Prague	2021–22	Czech First League	24	6	3	1	13 (Note: Two appearances in UEFA Champions League, one appearance in UEFA Europa League, ten appearances and four goals in UEFA Europa Conference League)	4	—		40	11
Slavia Prague	2022–23	Czech First League	19	11	2	2	11 (Note: Appearances in UEFA Europa Conference League)	4	—		32	17
Slavia Prague	Total		111	33	12	4	44	12	1	0	178	49
Red Star	2023–24	Serbian SuperLiga	35	11	3	1	5	0	—		43	12
Red Star	2024–25	Serbian SuperLiga	7	2	0	0	5	0	—		12	2
Red Star	2025–26	Serbian SuperLiga	4	1	0	0	5 (Note: Four appearances in UEFA Champions League, one appearance in UEFA Europa League)	0	—		9	1
Red Star	Total		46	14	3	1	15	0	—		64	15
Career total			288	87	38	17	79	12	3	1	405	116

== Honours ==
Bylis

- Albanian Cup runner-up: 2012–13

Yenicami Ağdelen

- KTFF Süper Lig: 2013–14
- Federasyon Kupası runner-up: 2013–14

Skënderbeu

- Kategoria Superiore: 2014–15

Slavia Prague

- Czech First League: 2018–19, 2019–20, 2020–21
- Czech Cup: 2018–19, 2020–21, 2022–23

Red Star Belgrade

- Serbian SuperLiga: 2023–24, 2024–25
- Serbian Cup: 2023–24, 2024–25
