= Mario Holek =

Czech footballer

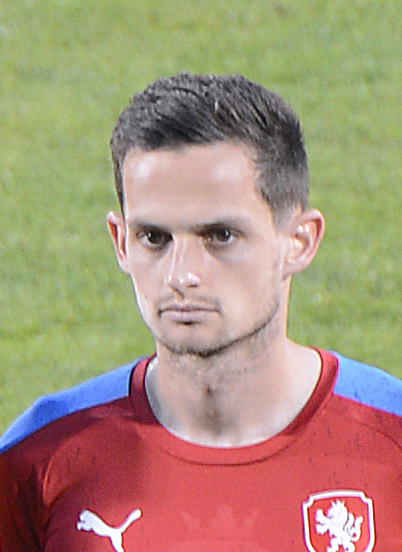

Personal information
- Full name: Mario Holek
- Date of birth: 28 October 1986 (age 40)
- Place of birth: Brno, Czechoslovakia
- Height: 1.85 m (6 ft 1 in)
- Position: Centre back

Youth career
- 1990–2004: 1. FC Brno

Senior career*
Years	Team	Apps	(Gls)
2005–2007	1. FC Brno	67	(4)
2008–2011	Dnipro Dnipropetrovsk	60	(1)
2012–2017	Sparta Prague	124	(2)
2017–2018	→ Dukla Prague (loan)	4	(0)
2018	Příbram	0	(0)

International career
2003	Czech Republic U17	2	(0)
2003	Czech Republic U18	8	(0)
2004–2005	Czech Republic U19	10	(0)
2006–2008	Czech Republic U21	19	(1)
2009–2015	Czech Republic	8	(0)
- * Club domestic league appearances and goals as of 23 December 2018

Mario Holek (born 28 October 1986) is a retired Czech footballer who represented the Czech Republic national football team.

He started his career in his hometown of Brno in the Czech Republic playing for the local club 1. FC Brno, where he spent five seasons. In January 2008, Holek was transferred to Ukraine, to a Premier Division club Dnipro Dnipropetrovsk. In December 2011 he joined Sparta as a free agent. Later in his career he played for Dukla Prague and Příbram.
