= Převýšov =

- Municipality
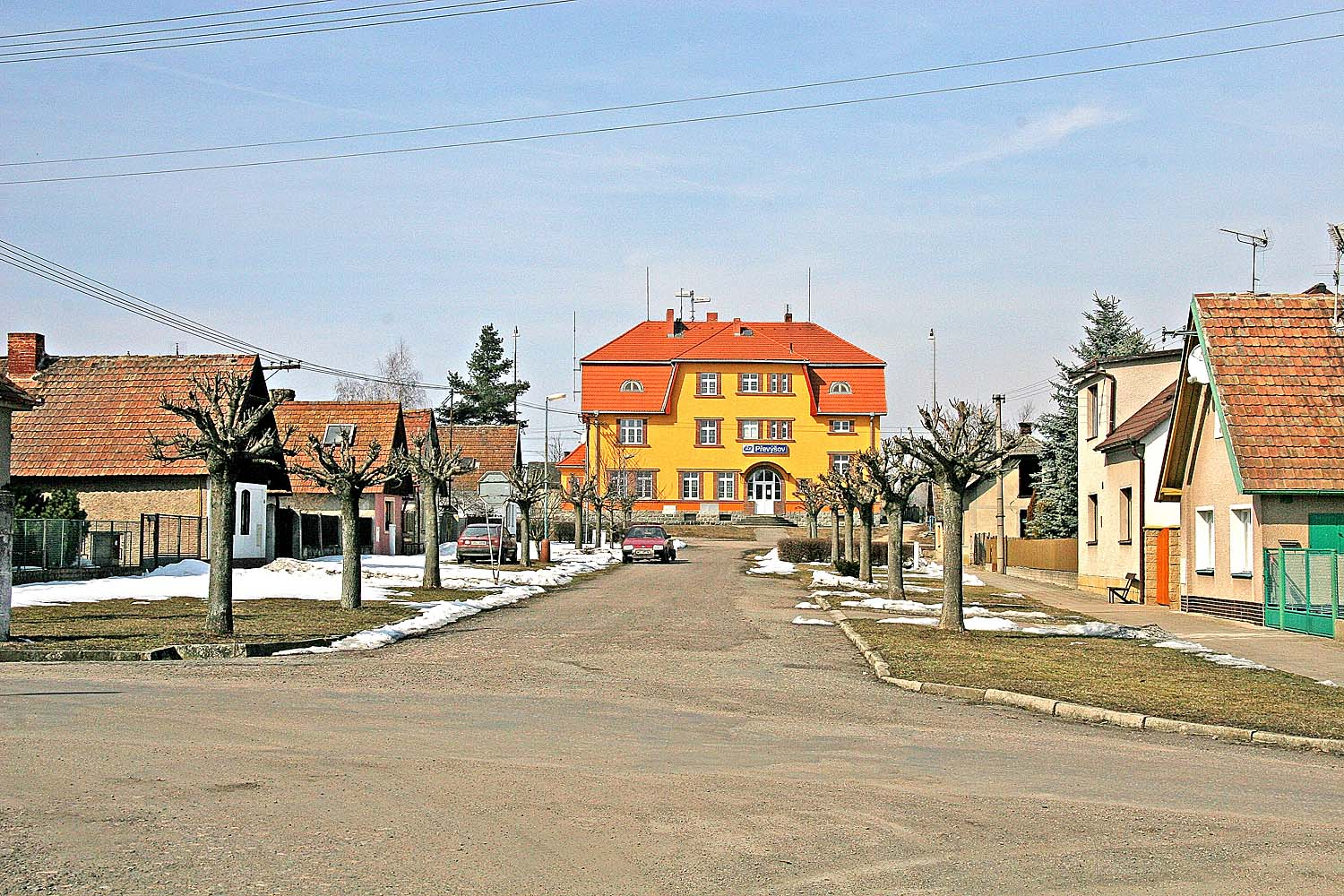
- View towards the railway station

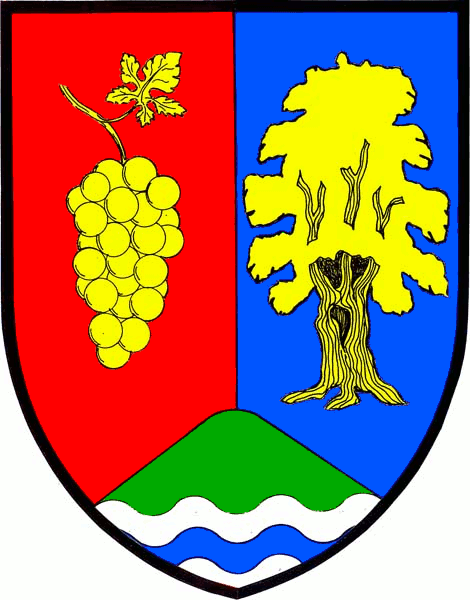
- Flag Coat of arms

- Location in the Czech Republic
- Coordinates: 50°9′6″N 15°24′38″E
- Country: Czech Republic
- Region: Hradec Králové
- District: Hradec Králové
- First mentioned: 1386

Area
  - Total: 4.39 km^{2} (1.69 sq mi)
- Elevation: 229 m (751 ft)

Population (2026-01-01)
  - Total: 359
  - Density: 81.8/km^{2} (212/sq mi)
- Time zone: UTC+1 (CET)
  - Summer (DST): UTC+2 (CEST)
- Postal code: 503 51
- Website: www.prevysov.cz

Převýšov (German: Neudorf) is a municipality and village in Hradec Králové District in the Hradec Králové Region of the Czech Republic. It has about 400 inhabitants.

== Etymology ==
The initial name of the village was Přibýšov. The name was derived from the personal name Přibýš, meaning "Přibýš's (court)". In the 19th century, the name was distorted to Přebýšov and then to Převýšov.

== Geography ==
Převýšov is located about 6 kilometres (4 mi) southwest of Hradec Králové. It lies on the border between the East Elbe Table and Central Elbe Table.

== History ==
The first written mention of Převýšov is from 1386, when there was a stronghold. The village was part of the Chlumec estate. The most notable owners were the Kinsky family and the Pernštejn family. Vojtěch I of Pernštejn had founded vineyards here, but winegroving ended during the Thirty Years' War. In the 1870s, the railway was constructed, which contributed to the development of the area.

== Demographics ==
Historical population

Year	Pop.	±%
1869	364	—
1880	452	+24.2%
1890	427	−5.5%
1900	411	−3.7%
1910	445	+8.3%

Year	Pop.	±%
1921	435	−2.2%
1930	440	+1.1%
1950	368	−16.4%
1961	340	−7.6%
1970	331	−2.6%

Year	Pop.	±%
1980	366	+10.6%
1991	344	−6.0%
2001	353	+2.6%
2011	319	−9.6%
2021	333	+4.4%

Source: Censuses

== Transport ==
Převýšov is located on the railway line Kolín–Trutnov.

== Sport ==
The municipality is home to SK Převýšov, which plays in lower amateur tiers.

== Sights ==
There are no protected cultural monuments in the municipality. The only historical landmark is a wooden belfry.
