= Emmanuel Edmond =

Nigerian footballer

Personal information
- Full name: Emmanuel Edmond
- Date of birth: 13 June 1996 (age 30)
- Place of birth: Nigeria
- Height: 1.79 m (5 ft 10 in)
- Position: Forward

Youth career
- GBS Academy

Senior career*
Years	Team	Apps	(Gls)
2014–2015	AS Trenčín	9	(3)
2016–2017	Dukla Prague	7	(1)
- * Club domestic league appearances and goals as of 30 June 2017

Emmanuel Edmond (born 13 June 1996) is a Nigerian footballer who plays as a forward.

== Career ==
On 14 August 2014, Edmond signed a three-year contract for the Slovak side AS Trenčín. He made his debut for AS Trenčín on 17 August 2014 against Košice, entering in as a substitute in place of Patrik Mišák in the 57th minute of the match. Edmond played in the Czech First League for FK Dukla Prague in the 2016–17 season.
