= Budge Manzia =

Congolese footballer (born 1994)

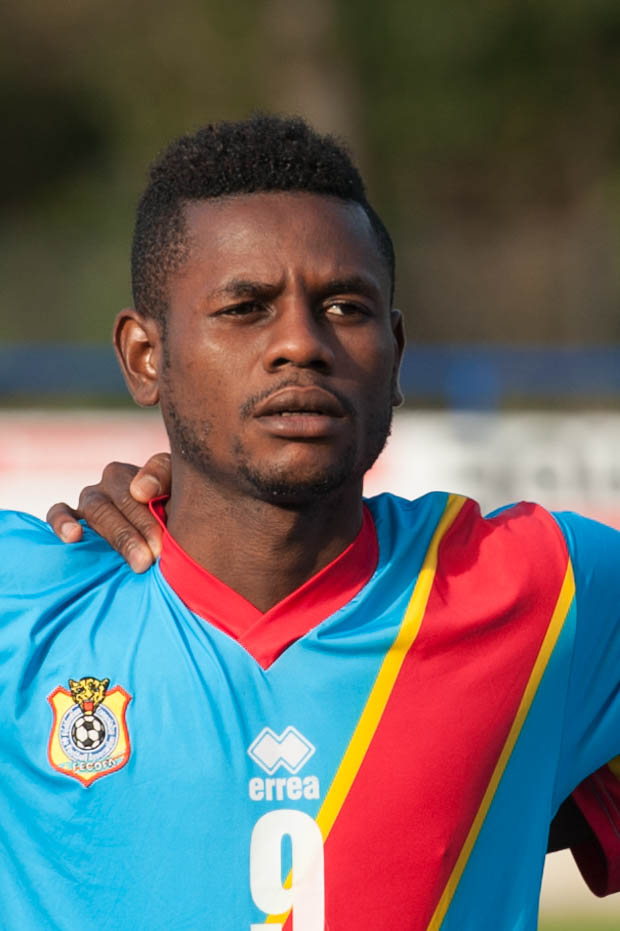
- Manzia in 2014

Personal information
- Date of birth: 24 September 1994 (age 32)
- Place of birth: Kinshasa, Zaire
- Height: 1.75 m (5 ft 9 in)
- Position: Forward

Team information
- Current team: Seyssinet

Senior career*
Years	Team	Apps	(Gls)
2012	Sharks XI		
2013–2014	Étoile du Sahel	3	(1)
2014–2017	Dukla Prague	16	(2)
2015	→ Baník Sokolov (loan)	12	(5)
2017–2018	Sigma Olomouc	30	(2)
2019–2021	SFC Opava	11	(0)
2020	→ Baník Sokolov (loan)	6	(0)
2021–2022	Frýdek-Místek	16	(0)
2023	Gières		
2023–	Seyssinet	9	(0)

International career
2012	DR Congo	2	(0)
- * Club domestic league appearances and goals as of 7 December 2024

Budge Manzia (born 24 September 1994) is a Congolese professional footballer who plays as a forward for French Championnat National 3 club Seyssinet. He made two appearances for the DR Congo national team in 2012.

== Club career ==
At club level, Manzia played in the Tunisian Ligue Professionnelle 1 for Étoile du Sahel before moving to the Czech Republic to join Dukla Prague in January 2014. He joined Baník Sokolov of the second league on loan in July 2015. He scored in their first game of the 2015–16 Czech National Football League, a 1–0 win against FK Pardubice. Manzia scored a hattrick in Sokolov's 3–0 win against Varnsdorf in November 2015 before his loan spell expired. In April 2016, Manzia scored his first Czech First League goal in a 2–2 draw at Mladá Boleslav. He scored the second goal of the game in the 11th minute after a cross from Jakub Mareš, having provided the pass to Mareš for the first goal earlier in the game.

In the winter break of the 2016–17 season, Manzia joined second-tier side Sigma Olomouc, signing a 2 1/2-year contract.

== International career ==
Manzia represented the Democratic Republic of the Congo in a friendly versus Burkina Faso on 14 November 2012. Following his debut he was named in the Congolese squad for the 2013 Africa Cup of Nations but did not play. He was also named in the Congolese squad for 2013 African U-20 Championship.
