= Stanislav Klobása =

Czech footballer

Personal information
- Full name: Stanislav Klobása
- Date of birth: 7 March 1994 (age 32)
- Place of birth: Brandýs nad Labem, Czech Republic
- Height: 1.76 m (5 ft 9 in)
- Position: Forward

Youth career
- Mladá Boleslav

Senior career*
| Years | Team | Apps | (Gls) |
| 2013–2019 | Mladá Boleslav | 25 | (5) |
| 2014 | → Vlašim (loan) | 2 | (0) |
| 2017–2018 | → Varnsdorf (loan) | 22 | (10) |
| 2018–2021 | Vysočina Jihlava | 49 | (26) |

International career
| 2012 | Czech Republic U19 | 3 | (0) |
| 2015–2016 | Czech Republic U21 | 7 | (1) |
- * Club domestic league appearances and goals as of 10 February 2021

Stanislav Klobása (born 7 March 1994) is a former professional Czech football forward who played for FC Vysočina Jihlava.
