= Jaroslav Hynek =

Czech footballer and manager

Personal information
- Date of birth: 5 September 1975 (age 51)
- Place of birth: Šternberk, Czechoslovakia

Senior career*
Years	Team	Apps	(Gls)
- Uničov
- Přerov

Managerial career
- 2016–2018: Dukla Prague
- 2019–2022: Czech Republic WU-17
- 2022–2024: MŠK Žilina
- 2024–2025: Zbrojovka Brno
- 2025: Tatran Prešov
- * Club domestic league appearances and goals

Jaroslav Hynek (born 5 September 1975) is a Czech professional football manager and former player who was recently in charge of Tatran Prešov.

== Playing career ==
Hynek played in the Czech Second League for Přerov, leaving the club at the age of 24.

== Managerial career ==
Hynek took over from Jaroslav Šilhavý as manager of Czech First League side Dukla Prague in September 2016, following Šilhavý's departure to Slavia Prague. Having guided Dukla to a 7th-placed finish in the 2016–17 season, Hynek signed a new two-year contract with the club in May 2017. Hynek's second season at Dukla was less successful, with the club losing 16 matches and finishing just two points from the relegation places. This led to the backroom staff, including Hynek, being dismissed in June 2018.

== Honours ==
Tatran Prešov

- 2. Liga: 2024–25
