= Ondřej Brejcha =

Czech footballer

Personal information
- Date of birth: 3 May 1994 (age 32)
- Place of birth: Czech Republic
- Height: 1.74 m (5 ft 9 in)
- Position: Midfielder

Team information
- Current team: VfB Auerbach
- Number: 7

Senior career*
Years	Team	Apps	(Gls)
2015	Vlašim	11	(1)
2016–2018	Dukla Prague	2	(0)
2018	Benešov	16	(1)
2018–2021	Vyšehrad	38	(3)
2020–2021	→ Sokol Hostouň (loan)		
2021–	VfB Auerbach	37	(5)
- * Club domestic league appearances and goals as of 29 May 2022

Ondřej Brejcha (Czech pronunciation: [ˈbrɛjxaː]; born 3 May 1994) is a Czech footballer who plays as a midfielder for NOFV-Oberliga Süd club VfB Auerbach.
