= Lukáš Holík =

Czech footballer

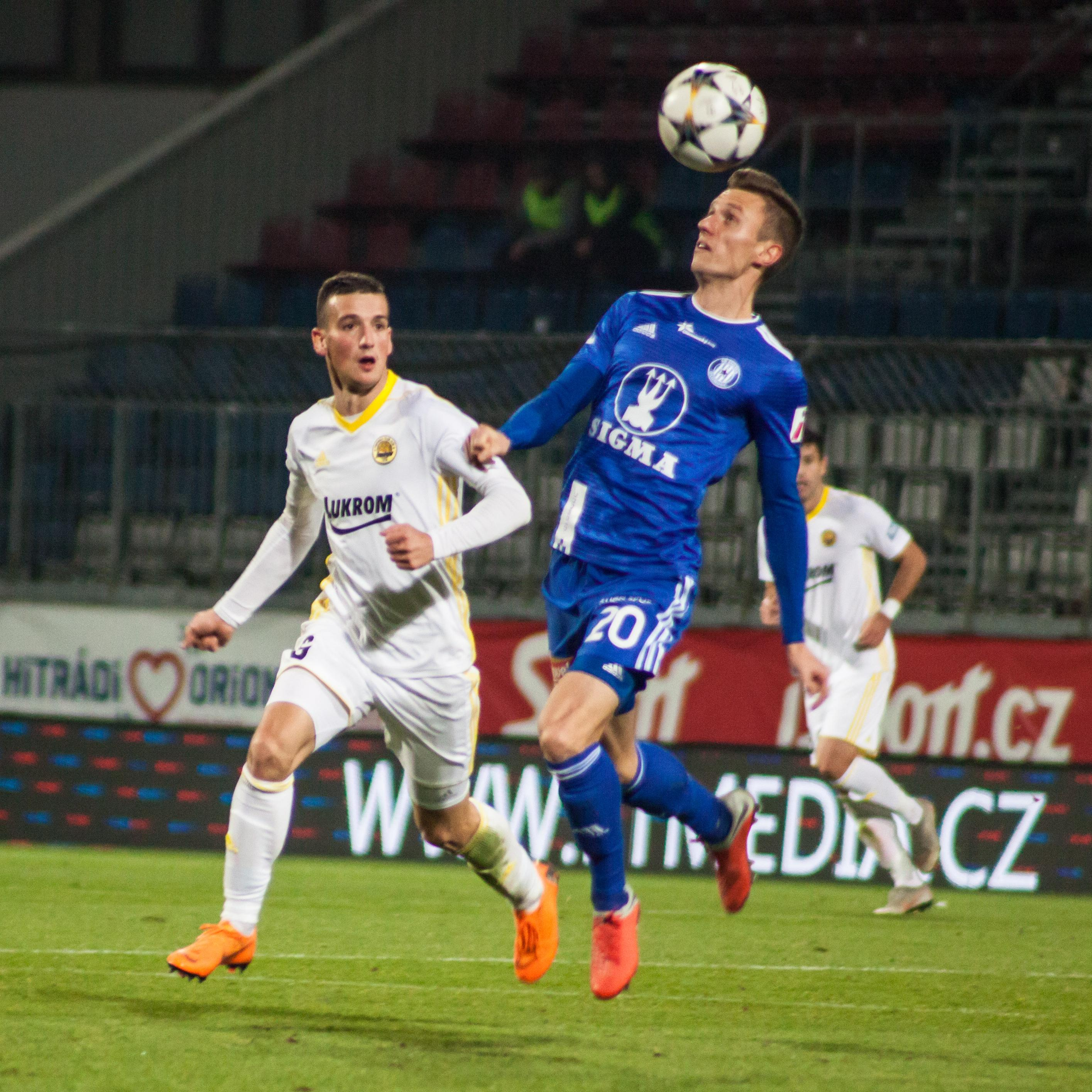
- Lukáš Holík (in white) with Fastav Zlín (2018)

Personal information
- Date of birth: 23 August 1992 (age 34)
- Place of birth: Czech Republic
- Height: 1.78 m (5 ft 10 in)
- Position: Midfielder

Team information
- Current team: Hanácká Slavia Kroměříž
- Number: 19

Youth career
- 2001–2011: Zlín

Senior career*
Years	Team	Apps	(Gls)
2011–2017	Zlín	118	(14)
2017–2020	Dukla Prague	70	(17)
2018	→ Zlín (loan)	6	(0)
2020–2022	Opava	41	(6)
2022	MFK Karviná	10	(0)
2022–2024	FK Třinec	55	(9)
2024–	Hanácká Slavia Kroměříž	52	(14)
- * Club domestic league appearances and goals as of 28 May 2026

Lukáš Holík (born 23 August 1992) is a professional Czech football midfielder currently playing for Hanácká Slavia Kroměříž in the Czech National Football League.

He made his career league debut for Zlín on 15 October 2011 in a Czech National Football League 2–0 away loss at Sokolov. He scored his first league goal one week later in a 1–0 home win against Čáslav.
