= David Bezdička =

Czech footballer (born 1996)

Personal information
- Date of birth: 9 July 1996 (age 30)
- Place of birth: Czech Republic
- Height: 1.75 m (5 ft 9 in)
- Position: Forward

Team information
- Current team: SpVgg SV Weiden
- Number: 17

Senior career*
Years	Team	Apps	(Gls)
2015–2020	Dukla Prague	11	(0)
2017–2018	→ Domažlice (loan)	34	(5)
2019	→ Teplice (loan)	5	(0)
2020–2022	Viktoria Žižkov	17	(1)
2022	→ Rakovník (loan)	12	(1)
2022–	SpVgg SV Weiden	14	(9)
- * Club domestic league appearances and goals as of 5 November 2022

David Bezdička (born 9 July 1996) is a Czech football player who plays for German club SpVgg SV Weiden.

== Club career ==
He signed for Žižkov in the winter break of the 2019–20 season after being released by Dukla Prague.
