= Radek Příhoda =

Czech football referee

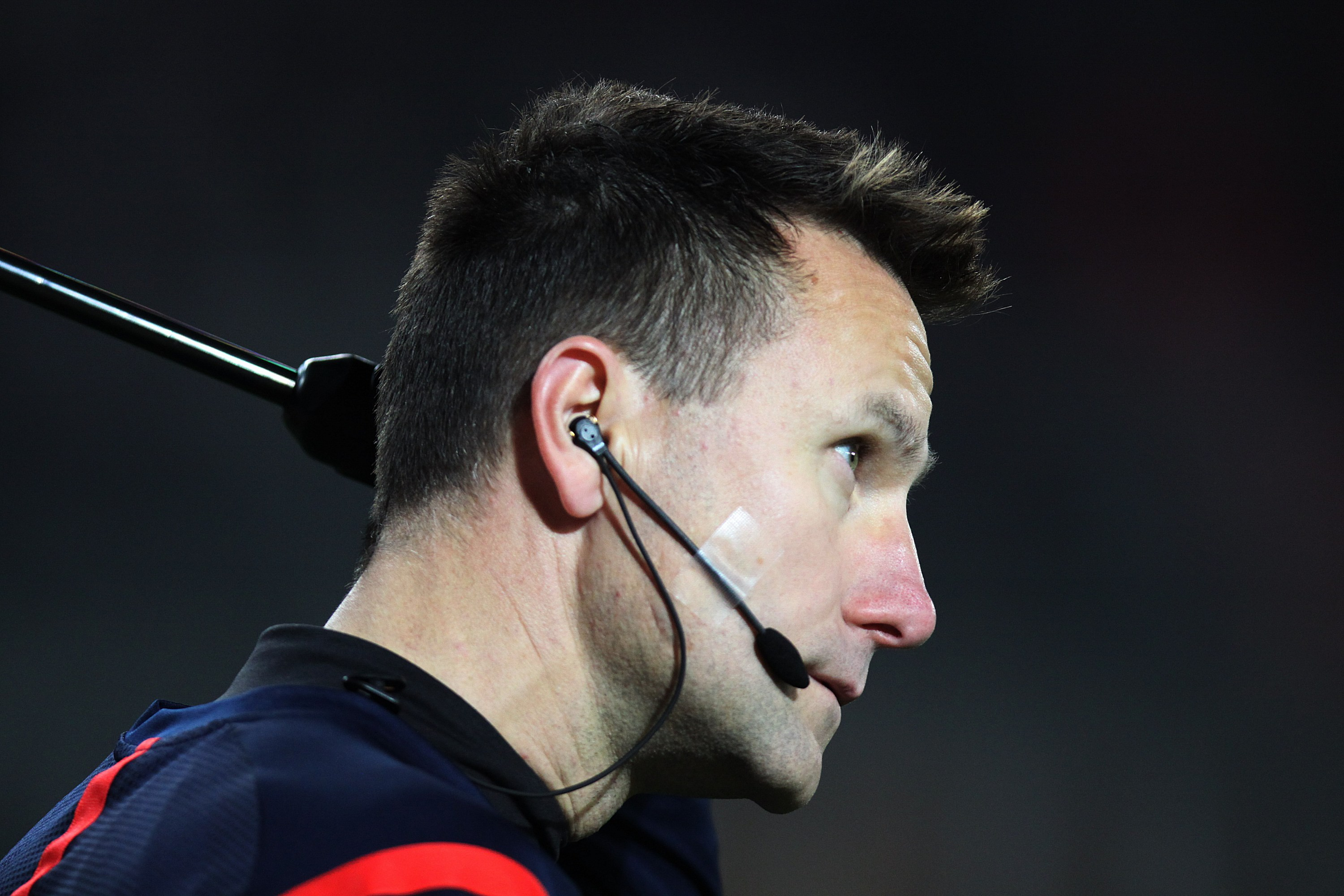
- Born: 25 March 1974 (age 52); Czechoslovakia

International
Years	League	Role
2008–	FIFA listed	Referee

Radek Příhoda (born 25 March 1974) is a Czech football referee. He has been a full international for FIFA since 2008.
