= Patrik Brandner =

Czech footballer

Personal information
- Date of birth: 4 January 1994 (age 32)
- Place of birth: Drozdov, Czech Republic
- Height: 1.80 m (5 ft 11 in)
- Position: Winger

Youth career
- Příbram

Senior career*
Years	Team	Apps	(Gls)
2015–2017	Příbram	33	(4)
2017–2019	Dukla Prague	45	(1)
2019–2022	České Budějovice	98	(14)
2022–2024	Slovácko	19	(1)
2024	České Budějovice	6	(0)
2024–2025	Zlín	21	(0)
2025–2026	Viktoria Žižkov	23	(0)
- * Club domestic league appearances and goals as of 28 May 2026

Patrik Brandner (born 4 January 1994) is a Czech professional footballer.

== Career ==
He joined Dukla from Příbram in January 2017, signing a contract until the end of the 2018–19 season.

On 15 February 2019, he joined České Budějovice.

On 15 February 2024, Brandner returned to SK Dynamo České Budějovice, signing a contract until end of the season.
