= Frederik Bilovský =

Slovak footballer

Personal information
- Full name: Frederik Bilovský
- Date of birth: 3 March 1992 (age 34)
- Place of birth: Dubnica nad Váhom, Czechoslovakia
- Height: 1.81 m (5 ft 11 in)
- Position: Midfielder

Team information
- Current team: Spartak Myjava
- Number: 10

Youth career
- –2011: Dubnica

Senior career*
Years	Team	Apps	(Gls)
2011–2013	Dubnica	60	(6)
2014–2016	Spartak Myjava	75	(5)
2017–2018	Dukla Prague	41	(2)
2019–2020	Nitra	26	(3)
2020–2023	Dubnica	68	(6)
2023–	Spartak Myjava	17	(1)
- * Club domestic league appearances and goals as of 2 April 2024

Frederik Bilovský (born 3 March 1992) is a Slovak professional footballer who plays as a midfielder for Spartak Myjava.

== Club career ==
He made his debut for Spartak Myjava on 29 March 2014 against Nitra, entering as a substitute in place of Tomáš Bruško in the 69th minute of the game. After Myjava withdrew from Fortuna Liga during the winter break in 2016–17 season, Bilovský joined Czech top-division club Dukla Prague, where he had spent some 2 years. After this spell, he returned to Slovakia, signing for Nitra on the 23 January 2019, being understood as a partial replacement for Andrej Fábry, who left Nitra for Czech top-division club Jablonec.
