= Jan Holenda =

Czech footballer

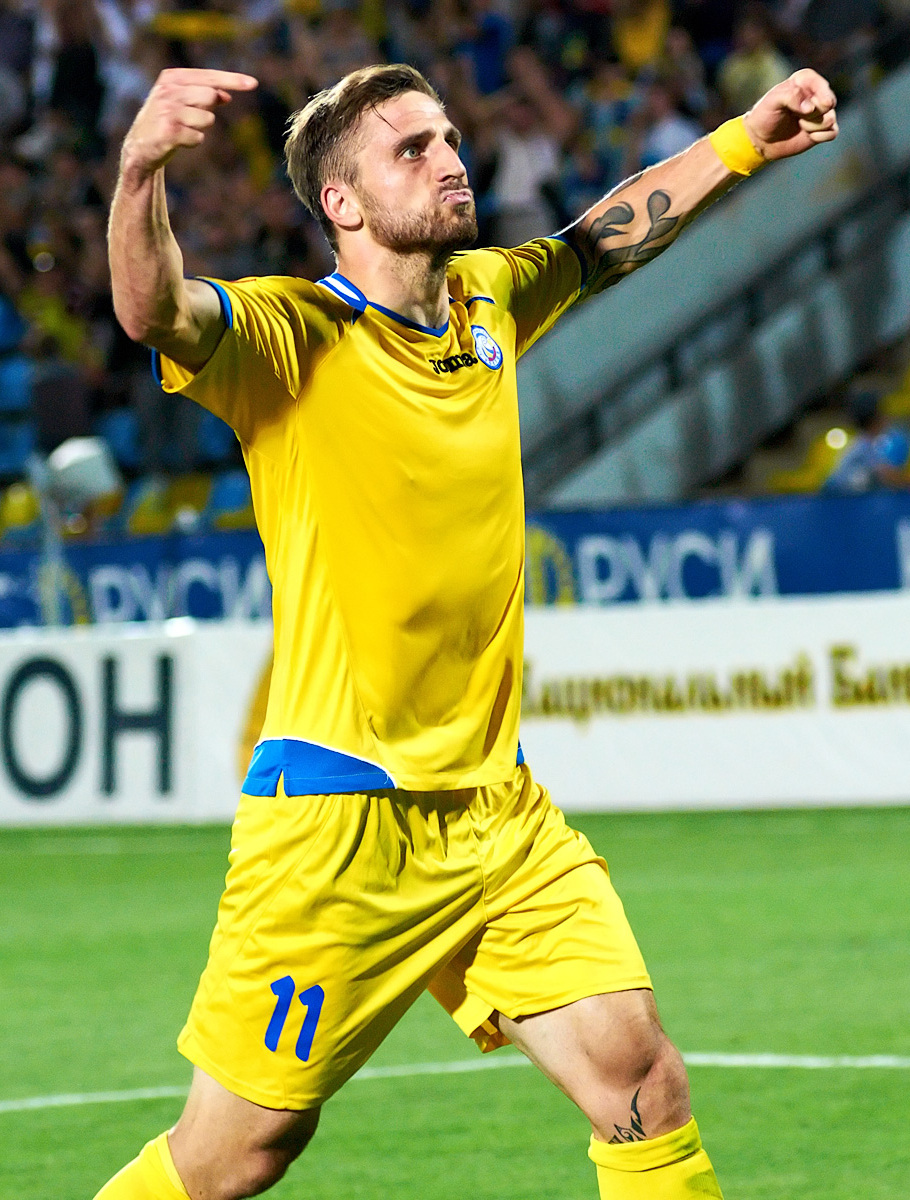
- Holenda in 2012

Personal information
- Date of birth: 22 August 1985 (age 41)
- Place of birth: Prague, Czechoslovakia
- Height: 1.86 m (6 ft 1 in)
- Position: Forward

Youth career
- 1991–2003: Sparta Prague

Senior career*
Years	Team	Apps	(Gls)
2003–2004	Sparta Prague B	34	(2)
2004–2010	Sparta Prague	35	(6)
2004–2005	→ FK Drnovice (loan)	25	(5)
2005–2007	→ Slovan Liberec (loan)	31	(6)
2007	→ České Budějovice (loan)	11	(1)
2007	→ FK Baník Most (loan)	8	(0)
2010–2012	Anzhi Makhachkala	43	(11)
2012–2014	FC Rostov	30	(6)
2013–2014	→ FC Tom Tomsk (loan)	21	(3)
2014–2017	Viktoria Plzeň	36	(5)
2016	→ Bohemians 1905 (loan)	10	(1)
2017–2019	FK Dukla Prague	55	(14)

International career
2006–2007	Czech Republic U-21	14	(1)
- * Club domestic league appearances and goals

Jan Holenda (born 22 August 1985) is a Czech former professional footballer who played as a striker. Holenda was a journeyman, having played for eight different clubs in the Czech First League, as well as three in the Russian Premier League. He won league titles with Slovan Liberec (2005–06) and Viktoria Plzeň (2014–15 and 2015–16).

== Career ==
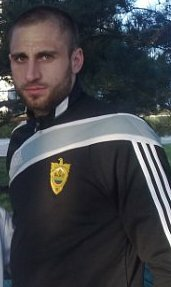
Holenda during his time at Anzhi Makhachkala

Holenda began his football career at Sparta Prague. He played in the reserve side for one season as he made 34 appearances and scored twice in the 2003/04 season.

=== Loan spells ===
The next season, he joined First League side FK Drnovice on loan, scoring five goals in 25 appearances. The following season, he went out on loan again, this time to Slovan Liberec, making 18 appearances and scoring four times as Liberec won the league title. He would spend another season at the club and he would make his Champions League Qualification debut, coming on as a substitute, in a 0–0 draw against Russian side Spartak Moscow. However, Liberec lost 2–1 on aggregate and would go to the first round of the UEFA Cup. In the first round of UEFA Cup on the second leg, Holenda scored a winning goal in a 2–1 win over Red Star Belgrade and advanced to the Group Stage. However, the club was eliminated in the Group Stage. In the club's UEFA Cup campaign, Holenda played all the matches. In the second half of the season, Holenda returned to Sparta Prague after his first team there was limited and was loaned to České Budějovice for six months. After a loan spell at České Budějovice, he was loaned again, but this time to Baník Most in September. Holenda made his debut on 30 September 2007 in a 1–0 loss against České Budějovice. After making eight appearances playing 90 minutes without a rest, he returned to the parent club in January.

=== Return to Sparta Prague ===
After various loan spells, Holenda became a first-team regular at Sparta Prague. He played his first match on 10 March 2008, in a 1–0 win over Teplice once again after he made his debut in the early part of the season, coming on as a substitute in the 85th minute, in a 2–1 loss against Teplice on 16 September 2007. Holenda scored his first goal in a 3–0 win over Baník Most on 20 April 2008 and scored in the last game of the season, against his former club, in a 4–3 loss on 17 May 2008. At the end of the season, Sparta Prague won the Czech Cup.

The following season, Holenda got more playing time and he scored his first goal of the season in a 2–1 win over Viktoria Žižkov on 8 March 2009. The next game, Holenda scored another goal and provided assist for Wilfried Bony in a 4–0 win over Zbrojovka Brno eight days later. Early in the season, Holenda played all four matches in the club's Champions League's campaign before the club were eliminated in the third round against Panathinaikos.

The following season, Holenda scored his first goal of the season in a 1–1 draw against Zbrojovka Brno. In the Europa League group stage, he scored a brace in a 3–2 win over CFR Cluj. However the club couldn't progress to the knockout stage. After scoring a brace in the Europa League, he had been on a goalscoring with three in the last three games. In the third round of the Champions League, he scored his first CL goal in a 3–1 win over Panathinaikos.

=== Anzhi Makhachkala ===
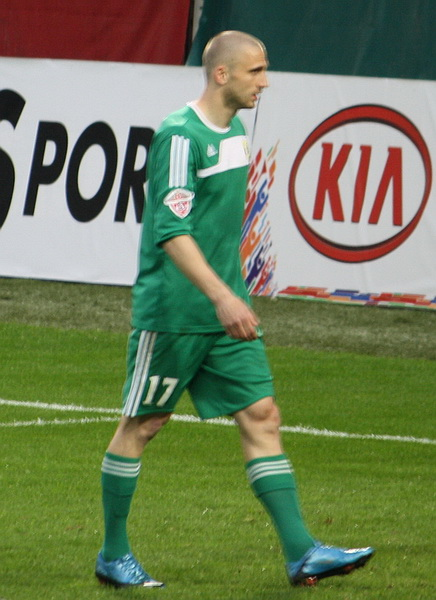
Holenda playing for Anzhi Makhachkala

In January 2010, Holenda joined Russian side Anzhi Makhachkala on a three-year contract. In the opening game of the season on 13 March, Holenda made his debut in a 0–0 draw against Spartak Nalchik. He scored his first goal in a 2–0 win over Alania Vladikavkaz on 3 April and scored a brace in the next games in a 4–2 win over Sibir Novosibirsk on 11 April. Six Month later, he scored in a 3–3 draw against Zenit Saint Petersburg, ending a six-month goal drought. One month later, he scored in a 3–1 win over Terek Grozny on 13 November.

At the beginning of the season, Holenda went on the scoring form with four. However soon after, Holenda received a lack of first-team football at the club after the club was purchased by Suleyman Kerimov and the club went on a shopping spree, signing players Samuel Eto'o and Yuri Zhirkov. But he did score a brace in a 5–3 loss against CSKA Moscow on 23 October 2010 and hadn't scored since. Holenda says he wants a first team football. At the end of the season, Holenda was the second top scorer behind Eto'o.

=== FC Rostov ===
In the 2012 summer transfer window, Holenda joined FC Rostov on a three-year deal. He made his debut in the opening game of the season, in a 1–0 loss against CSKA Moscow. The next game, he scored against his former club in a 2–2 draw on 29 July 2012. On 25 August 2012, Holenda scored a hat-trick in a 3–1 win over Alania Vladikavkaz.

=== Return to the Czech Republic ===
Holenda returned to the Czech Republic, signing as a free agent on a short-term contract with Viktoria Plzeň in October 2014. After playing six matches in the autumn part of the 2014–15 season, Holenda signed a new contract with Plzeň. With only five of his first 17 league appearances across the season as a member of the starting eleven, Holenda played mainly as a substitute, but decisive goals against his former club, Sparta Prague, and Slavia Prague helped Plzeň to the league title and with it, a new contract until June 2017. The following season, Plzeň won the league for a second consecutive time, but Holenda scored just one goal in 18 appearances.

Holenda didn't play for Plzeň at the beginning of the 2016–17 season, and joined Bohemians 1905 on a half-season loan in September 2016. In January 2017 he signed a contract until the summer of 2019 with fellow First League side FK Dukla Prague, with Dukla becoming the eighth First League club for Holenda to represent.

== International career ==
In his international career, he played in the youth Czech national team U-15, U-16, U-18, U-19 and U-21. In 2007, Holenda was involved in the squad for UEFA European Under-21 Football Championship but the national team U21 was placed last with one point.

== Honours ==
=== Liberec ===
- Czech First League: 2005–06

=== Sparta Prague ===
- Czech Cup: 2007–08

=== Plzeň ===
- Czech First League: 2014–15, 2015–16
- Czech Supercup: 2015
