= Jan Jílek =

Czech football referee

- Born: 5 June 1973 (age 53); Czechoslovakia

Domestic
Years	League	Role

International
Years	League	Role
2007–2010	FIFA listed	Referee

Jan Jílek (born 5 June 1973) is a Czech football referee. He was a full international for FIFA from 2007 to 2010.

== Career statistics ==
Statistics for Czech First League matches only.

Season	Games	Total (yellow card)	(yellow card) per game	Total (red card)	(red card) per game	Reference
2006/07	18	75	4.17	1	0.06	
2007/08	22	97	4.41	2	0.09	
2008/09	13	54	4.15	3	0.23	
2009/10	15	53	3.53	1	0.07	
2010/11	5	19	3.8	2	0.4	
Overall	73	298	4.08	9	0.12	
Please Note: There are no available records prior to 2006/2007
