= Michal Smejkal =

Czech footballer (born 1986)

Personal information
- Date of birth: 21 February 1986 (age 40)
- Place of birth: Plzeň, Czechoslovakia
- Height: 1.94 m (6 ft 4 in)
- Position: Centre-back

Senior career*
Years	Team	Apps	(Gls)
2005–2008	Viktoria Plzeň	35	(2)
2008–2012	Teplice	78	(4)
2012–2016	Mladá Boleslav	16	(1)
2014	→ Slavia Prague (loan)	12	(2)
2015	→ Okzhetpes (loan)	14	(0)
2016–2017	Dukla Prague	23	(1)

International career
2007	Czech Republic U21	5	(4)
- * Club domestic league appearances and goals

Michal Smejkal (born 21 February 1986) is a Czech former professional footballer who played as a centre-back for Viktoria Plzeň, FK Teplice, Mladá Boleslav, Slavia Prague, Okzhetpes and Dukla Prague.

== Career ==
In March 2015, Smejkal signed for Kazakhstan Premier League side FC Okzhetpes. He joined Dukla Prague in January 2016, signing a contract until the end of the 2016–17 season.
