= Ondřej Kušnír =

Czech footballer

Personal information
- Date of birth: 5 April 1984 (age 42)
- Place of birth: Ostrava, Czechoslovakia
- Height: 1.85 m (6 ft 1 in)
- Position: Right back

Youth career
- 1990–2002: TJ Vítkovice

Senior career*
Years	Team	Apps	(Gls)
2002–2006	FC Vítkovice	60	(3)
2006–2008	Viktoria Žižkov	53	(8)
2008–2012	Sparta Prague	74	(5)
2012–2014	Slovan Liberec	34	(1)
2014	Tobol	16	(2)
2015	Sigma Olomouc	7	(1)
2015–2016	Rapid Bucharest	23	(1)
2016–2018	Dukla Prague	49	(5)
2018–2020	Fotbal Třinec	44	(5)

International career
2002	Czech Republic U19	1	(0)
2004	Czech Republic U21	1	(0)
2010–2011	Czech Republic	4	(0)
- * Club domestic league appearances and goals

Ondřej Kušnír (born 5 April 1984) is a Czech former professional footballer who played for various clubs in the Czech Republic, Kazakhstan and Romania. He won the Czech title with Sparta Prague in 2009–10. Kušnír also played internationally, representing the Czech Republic four times.

== Club career ==
He won the Czech title with Sparta Prague in 2009–10.

In February 2014, Kušnír signed a one-year contract with FC Tobol of the Kazakhstan Premier League. He returned to the Czech Republic, joining Sigma Olomouc in February 2015 on a contract until the end of the 2015–16 season. Kušnír was one of three Czechs, together with Jiří Jeslínek and Tomáš Josl, who joined Romanian Liga II side Rapid Bucharest in the summer of 2015.

Kušnír joined Dukla Prague on a free transfer shortly before the beginning of the 2016–17 season. After scoring 5 goals in 49 matches, he left Dukla at the end of the 2017–18 season. Having spent his last two seasons at Fotbal Třinec, Kušnír retired from his playing career at the end of the 2019–20 season.

== International career ==
Kušnír played for the Czech Republic at youth level, playing for both the under-19 and under-21 national teams. After being called up to the national team at the end of 2009, but remaining an unused substitute, on 3 March 2010, Kušnír made his debut for the senior side of his country in the 0–1 loss against Scotland in a friendly match. He played in the 2011 Kirin Cup Soccer tournament, making the last of his four appearances for the Czech Republic in a 0–0 draw against Peru.

== Personal life ==
His father was also a professional footballer playing for TJ Vítkovice. In the 1985–86 season he won the Czechoslovak First League with them.

== Honours ==
Viktoria Žižkov

- Czech National Football League: 2006–07

Sparta Prague

- Czech First League: 2009–10

Sigma Olomouc

- Czech National Football League: 2014–15

Rapid București

- Liga II: 2015–16
