= Tomáš Obermajer =

Czech footballer

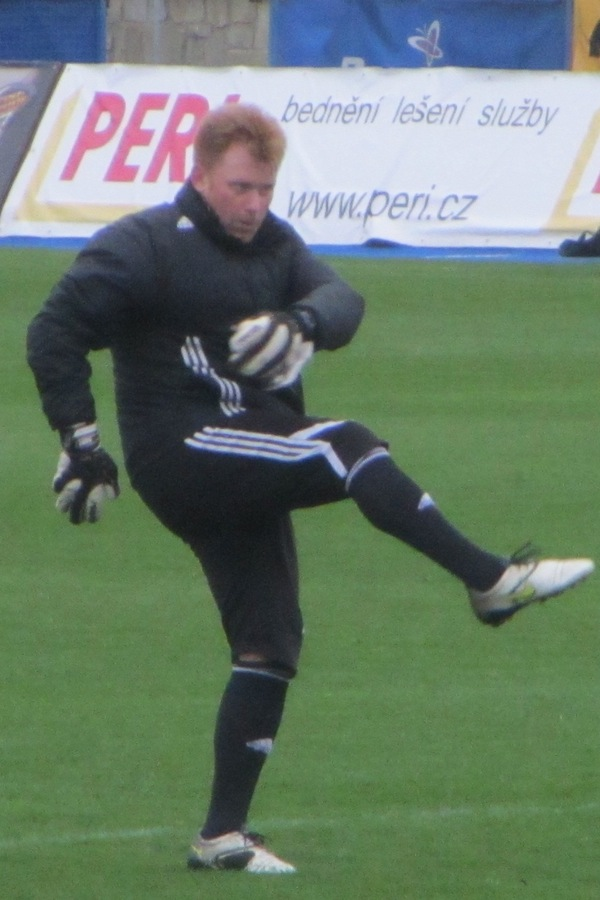

Personal information
- Date of birth: 27 December 1969 (age 55)
- Place of birth: Czechoslovakia
- Height: 1.84 m (6 ft 0 in)
- Position(s): Goalkeeper

Senior career*
| Years | Team | Apps | (Gls) |
| 2000–2005 | FK Chmel Blšany | 13 | (0) |
- *Club domestic league appearances and goals

Tomáš Obermajer (born 27 December 1969) is a Czech former football goalkeeper. He made his first Czech First League start for FK Chmel Blšany at the age of 30, in a 1–0 loss against Viktoria Žižkov in September 2000. He eventually played 13 matches in the Czech First League, all for Blšany.

Obermajer became the goalkeeping coach of Dukla Prague in 2007, a position he held until the end of the 2021–22 season.
