= Pavel Královec =

Czech football referee (born 1977)

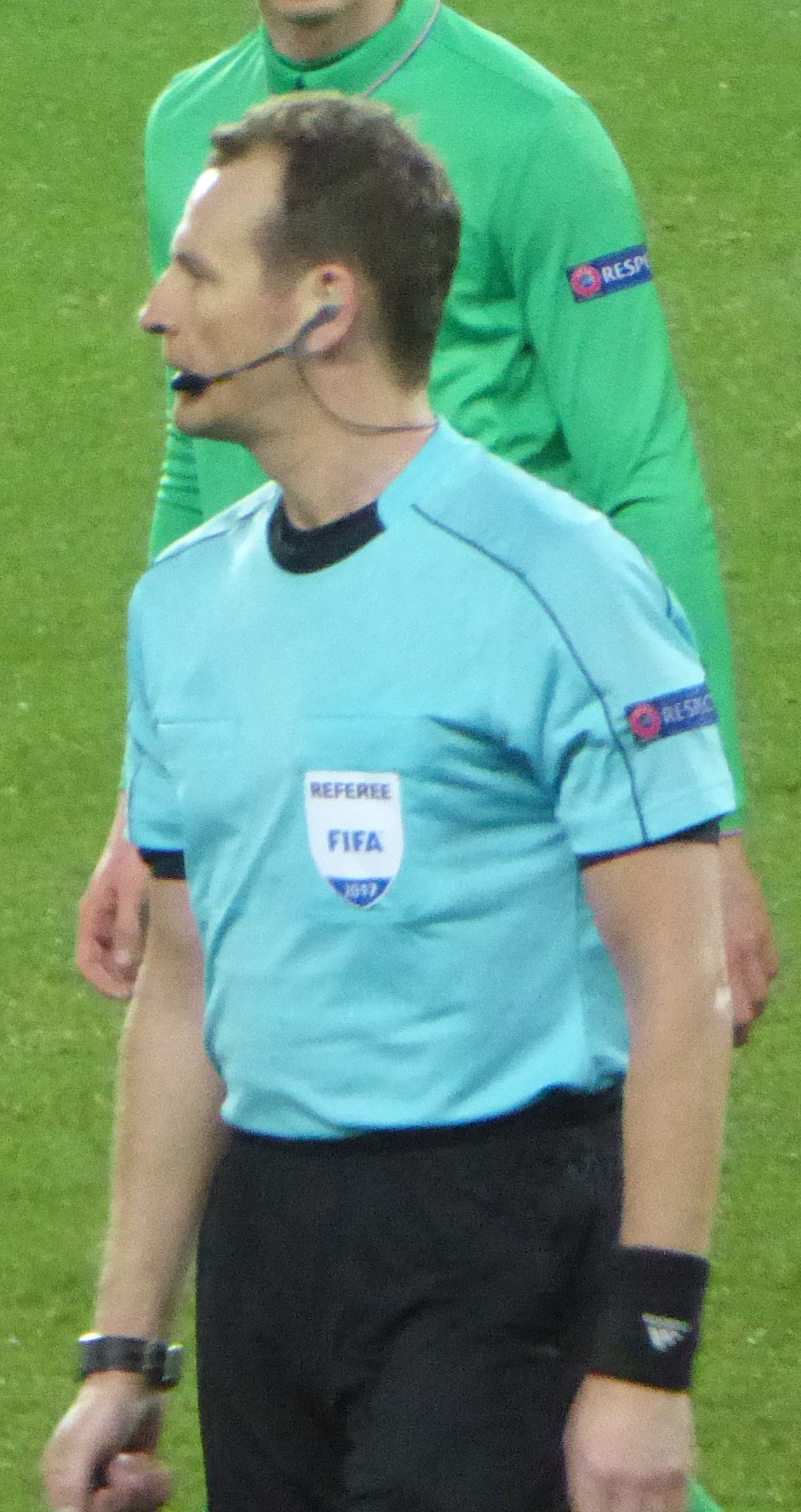
- Full name: Pavel Královec
- Born: 16 August 1977 (age 49); Domažlice, Czechoslovakia
- Other occupation: Engineer

Domestic
Years	League	Role

International
Years	League	Role
2005–	FIFA listed	Referee

Pavel Královec (born 16 August 1977) is a Czech football referee. He has been a full international for FIFA since 2005.

== Career ==
He was selected on the list of referees for the 2011 FIFA U-17 World Cup in Mexico and the 2012 Olympic tournament. He has also officiated in 2010 and 2014 World Cup qualifiers, as well as qualifying matches for Euro 2008 and Euro 2012.

In March 2013, FIFA named Královec to its list of 52 candidate referees for the 2014 FIFA World Cup in Brazil.

== Career statistics ==
Statistics for Gambrinus liga matches only.

Season	Games	Total (yellow card)	(yellow card) per game	Total (red card)	(red card) per game	Reference
2006/07	20	78	3.9	3	0.15	
2007/08	17	53	3.12	0	0	
2008/09	13	58	4.46	0	0	
2009/10	10	37	3.7	0	0	
2010/11	17	67	3.94	3	0.18	
Overall	77	293	3.81	6	0.08	
There are no available records prior to 2006/2007
