= Daniel Tetour =

Czech footballer

Personal information
- Date of birth: 17 July 1994 (age 32)
- Place of birth: Prague, Czech Republic
- Height: 1.81 m (5 ft 11 in)
- Position: Midfielder

Team information
- Current team: Slovácko
- Number: 8

Youth career
- Dukla Prague

Senior career*
Years	Team	Apps	(Gls)
2015–2020	Dukla Prague	141	(11)
2020–2024	Baník Ostrava	73	(12)
2024	Slovan Liberec	5	(0)
2024–2025	Ethnikos Achna	17	(1)
2025–	Slovácko	18	(3)

International career^{‡}
2015–2016	Czech Republic U21	5	(0)
- * Club domestic league appearances and goals as of 25 May 2026 ‡ National team caps and goals as of 8 October 2016

Daniel Tetour (born 17 July 1994) is a Czech professional footballer who plays for Slovácko.

== Career ==
On 22 February 2024, Tetour signed a half-year contract with two-year option with Slovan Liberec.

On 6 July 2024, Tetour signed a contract with Cypriot club Ethnikos Achna as a free agent.

On 25 June 2025, Tetour signed a two-year contract with Slovácko as a free agent.
