= Branislav Milošević =

Serbian footballer

Personal information
- Full name: Branislav Milošević
- Date of birth: 13 May 1988 (age 38)
- Place of birth: Valjevo, SFR Yugoslavia
- Height: 1.76 m (5 ft 9 1/2 in)
- Positions: Right-back; midfielder

Team information
- Current team: Rad
- Number: 21

Youth career
- OFK Osečina
- Budućnost Valjevo
- Obrenovac 1905
- Partizan

Senior career*
Years	Team	Apps	(Gls)
2005–2007	Partizan	0	(0)
2005–2007	→ Teleoptik (loan)	67	(5)
2008	Javor Ivanjica	0	(0)
2008–2012	BSK Borča	108	(2)
2012–2015	Rad	74	(9)
2015–2019	Dukla Prague	106	(7)
2019–2020	Rad	25	(0)
2020–2022	Proleter Novi Sad	59	(0)
2022–2023	Novi Sad 1921	22	(0)
2023–2024	Radnički Kragujevac	7	(0)
2025–	Rad	19	(4)
- * Club domestic league appearances and goals as of 15 July 2026

Branislav Milošević (Serbian Cyrillic: Бранислав Милошевић; born 13 May 1988) is a Serbian footballer who plays as a defender for Rad.
