= Miroslav Zelinka =

Czech football referee

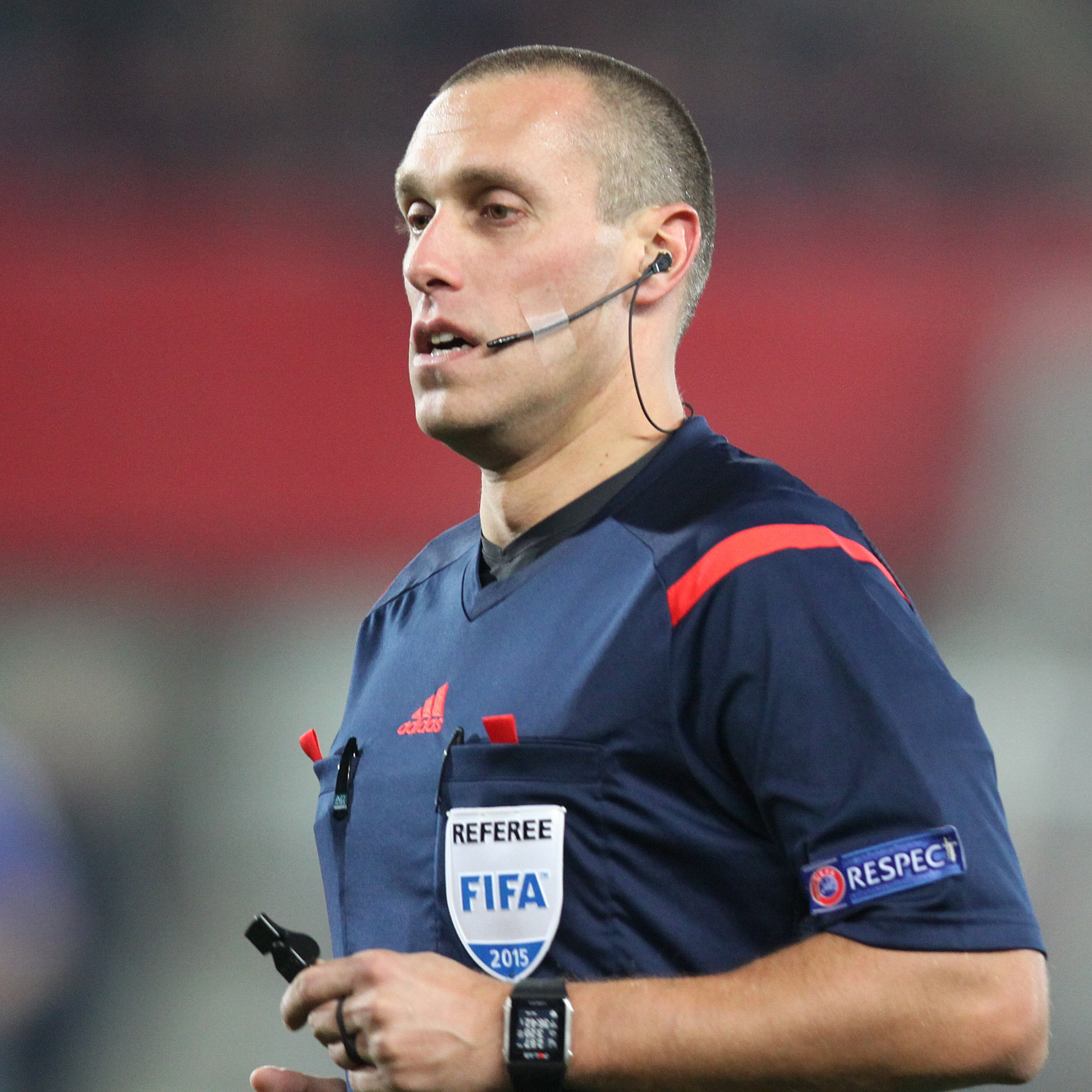
- Born: 23 February 1981 (age 45); Czechoslovakia

Domestic
Years	League	Role

International
Years	League	Role
2011–	FIFA listed	Referee

Miroslav Zelinka (born 23 February 1981) is a Czech football referee. He refereed at 2012–13 UEFA Europa League.

Zelinka became a FIFA referee in 2011. He has officiated in 2014 World Cup qualifiers.
