= Štěpán Koreš =

Czech footballer

Personal information
- Date of birth: 14 February 1989 (age 37)
- Place of birth: Písek, Czechoslovakia
- Height: 1.75 m (5 ft 9 in)
- Position: Midfielder

Senior career*
Years	Team	Apps	(Gls)
2009–2016	Slavia Prague	58	(6)
2014	→ Mladá Boleslav (loan)	10	(2)
2014	→ České Budějovice (loan)	8	(2)
2015–2016	→ Zlín (loan)	29	(7)
2016–2018	FK Dukla Prague	18	(1)
- * Club domestic league appearances and goals as of 30 June 2018

Štěpán Koreš (born 14 February 1989) is a Czech football player. He most recently played for FK Dukla Prague until his contract expired in 2018.
