= Stadion Juliska =

Multi-use stadium in Prague, Czechia

- Juliska
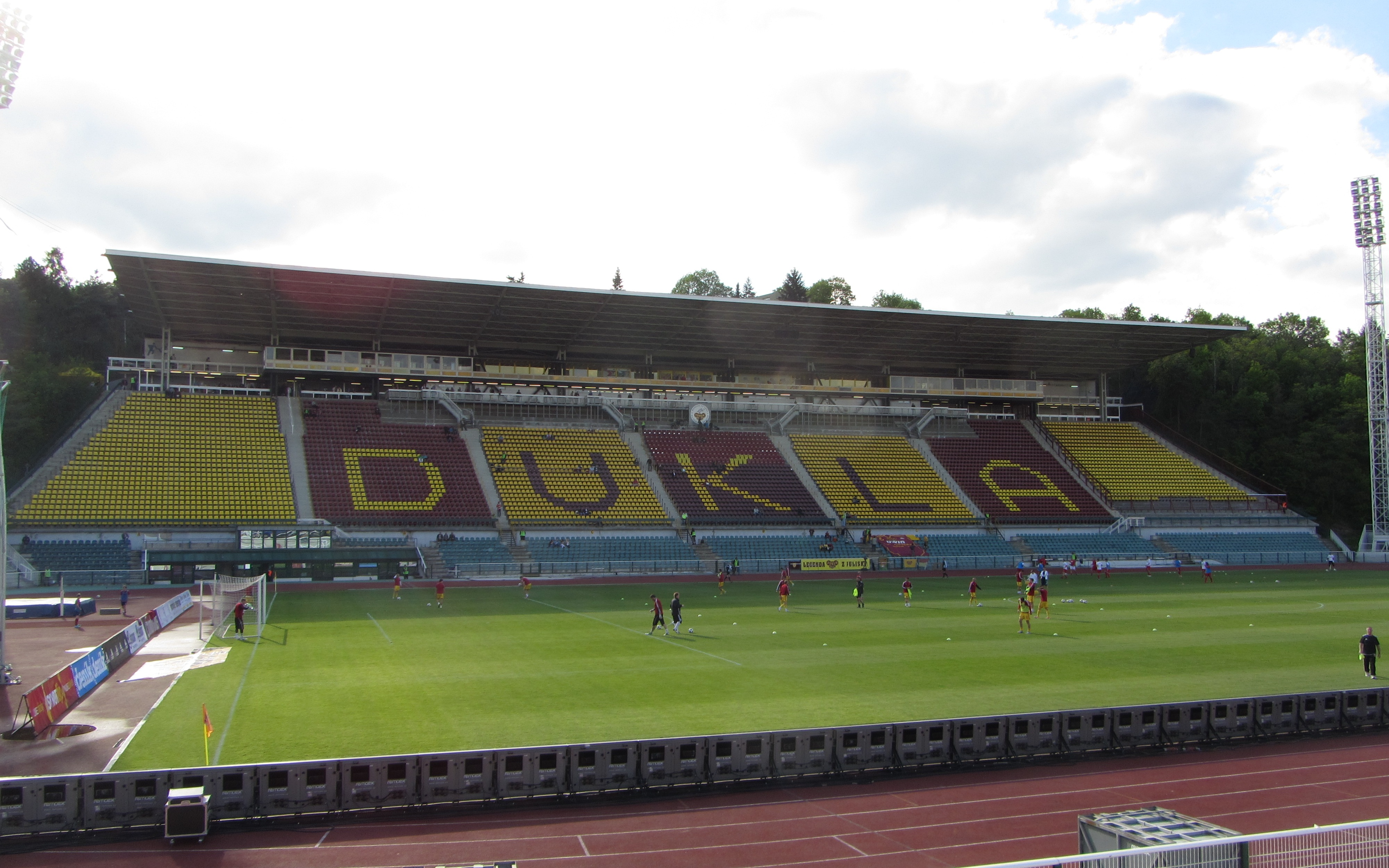
- Interactive map of Stadion Juliska
- Location: Na Julisce 28/2, Prague, Czech Republic, 160 00
- Coordinates: 50°06′43″N 14°23′15″E
- Owner: Ministry of Defence
- Capacity: 8,150
- Field size: 105m x 68m

Construction
- Opened: 1960
- Renovated: 2001, 2011

Tenants
- FK Dukla Prague; Dukla Prague (1960–1997)

Stadion Juliska is a multi-use stadium in Prague-Dejvice, Czech Republic. It is currently used mostly for football matches and is the home ground of FK Dukla Prague.

The stadium is also used for athletics events, including the annual Josef Odložil Memorial. The stadium seats 8,150 people on individual seats.

In 2012 a statue of former Dukla player and European Footballer of the Year 1962 Josef Masopust was unveiled outside the stadium.

== History ==
The stadium played host to its first Dukla match on 10 July 1960 in the 1960 Mitropa Cup. In front of a crowd of 10,000, Dukla beat visitors Wiener SK 2–1, with goals from Rudolf Kučera and Jiří Sůra.

In 1997, Dukla Prague vacated the stadium after 49 years in Prague. A redevelopment of the stadium was completed in 2001, costing 28 million Czech koruna. This redevelopment, which included the laying of a new all-weather running track, brought the stadium in line with IAAF standards.

League football returned to Juliska on 4 August 2007, as the new FK Dukla Prague hosted SFC Opava in their first home match after reaching the Czech 2. Liga. The home side missed a penalty and lost 2–1. On 29 July 2011, Juliska hosted its first top flight football fixture since 1 June 1994, the opening fixture of the 2011–12 Czech First League between FK Dukla Prague and SK Sigma Olomouc. The match finished 0–0.

Following Dukla's promotion to the Czech First League in June 2011, the Czech Football Association indicated that a condition of the club's acceptance into the league would be that they install under-soil heating and 2,270 new seats, scheduled to be installed between 23 September and 28 October 2011. On 5 October 2011, it emerged that the club's new under-soil heating would not be ready in time for the league match at home to Jablonec on 22 October, which meant switching the fixture to an alternative stadium in Prague.

== Transport ==
The ground is served by bus service 131 from Hradčanská metro station to bus stop, Dukla-Juliska. Tram services 8 and 18 run from Dejvická metro station to tram stop Nádraží Podbaba, near the Hotel International.
