= 2020–21 FC Slovan Liberec season =

Slovan Liberec
2020–21 season
- Chairman: Zbyněk Štiller
- Manager: Pavel Hoftych
- Stadium: Stadion u Nisy
- Czech First League: 6th
- Czech Cup: Quarter-finals
- UEFA Europa League: Group stage
- Top goalscorer: League: Jhon Mosquera (7); All: Jhon Mosquera (7)
Home colours	Away colours
- All statistics correct as of 29 May 2021.

The 2020–21 FC Slovan Liberec season was the club's 63rd season in existence and its 28th consecutive season in the top flight of Czech football. In addition to the domestic league, Slovan Liberec participated in this season's editions of the Czech Cup and also participated in the UEFA Europa League. The season covered the period from 1 July 2020 to 30 June 2021.

== Players ==
=== First-team squad ===
As of 30 January 2021

Note: Flags indicate national team as defined under FIFA eligibility rules; some limited exceptions apply. Players may hold more than one non-FIFA nationality.

No.	Pos.	Nation	Player
1	GK	CZE	Filip Nguyen
2	DF	CZE	Jakub Jugas (on loan from Slavia Prague)
3	DF	CZE	Jan Mikula
4	DF	CZE	Ondřej Karafiát (on loan from Slavia Prague)
5	MF	CZE	Jan Šulc
6	MF	CZE	Michal Sadílek (on loan from PSV Eindhoven)
7	FW	CZE	Michael Rabušic
8	MF	COL	Jhon Mosquera
10	MF	CZE	Jakub Pešek
11	MF	CZE	Jan Matoušek (on loan from Slavia Prague)
13	DF	CZE	Miroslav Dvořák
16	FW	SVK	Lukáš Csáno
18	DF	SVK	Martin Koscelník

No.	Pos.	Nation	Player
19	FW	BIH	Imad Rondić
20	MF	CZE	Maxmilián Jiří Kytka
22	MF	SVK	Michal Faško
23	MF	GUI	Kamso Mara
24	DF	CZE	Michal Fukala
26	MF	CZE	Radim Černický
27	FW	SVK	Dominik Gembický
28	MF	CZE	Kristian Michal
29	DF	CIV	Mohamed Tijani (on loan from Slavia Prague)
31	GK	CZE	Lukáš Hasalík
33	DF	GRE	Marios Pourzitidis
34	GK	CZE	Milan Knobloch
37	DF	CZE	Matěj Chaluš

=== Out on loan ===
Note: Flags indicate national team as defined under FIFA eligibility rules; some limited exceptions apply. Players may hold more than one non-FIFA nationality.

No.	Pos.	Nation	Player
—	DF	UKR	Taras Kacharaba (at SK Slavia Prague)
—	MF	CZE	Aleš Nešický (at SFC Opava)
—	FW	KOR	Yu Kang-hyun (at MFK Chrudim)

No.	Pos.	Nation	Player
—	DF	CZE	Petr Heppner (at FK Varnsdorf)
—	DF	CZE	Ondřej Lehoczki (at FK Varnsdorf)

== Pre-season and friendlies ==
Win Draw Loss Fixtures

1 August 2020 Friendly	Slovan Liberec (Czech Republic)	2–1	(Czech Republic) Chrudim	Přepeře, Czech Republic
--:-- CEST (UTC+2)				Stadium: FK Přepeře; Attendance: 0

1 August 2020 Friendly	Přepeře (Czech Republic)	2–1	(Czech Republic) Slovan Liberec	Přepeře, Czech Republic
--:-- CEST (UTC+2)				Stadium: FK Přepeře; Attendance: 0

5 August 2020 Friendly	Slovan Liberec (Czech Republic)	4–1	(Czech Republic) Viktoria Žižkov	Liberec, Czech Republic
--:-- CEST (UTC+2)				Stadium: Stadion u Nisy; Attendance: 0

8 August 2020 Friendly	Mladá Boleslav (Czech Republic)	2–2	(Czech Republic) Slovan Liberec	Mladá Boleslav, Czech Republic
--:-- CEST (UTC+2)				Stadium: Lokotrans Aréna; Attendance: 0

12 August 2020 Friendly	Slovan Liberec (Czech Republic)	1–1	(Czech Republic) Blansko	Ober-Grafendorf, Austria
--:-- CEST (UTC+2)				Stadium: Sportplatz Ober-Grafendorf; Attendance: 0

15 August 2020 Friendly	Rapid Wien (Austria)	3–0	(Czech Republic) Slovan Liberec	Vienna, Austria
--:-- CEST (UTC+2)	Kara 8'; Greiml 19'; Fountas 58'			Stadium: Allianz Stadion; Attendance: 0

== Competitions ==
=== Overview ===
Competition	First match	Last match	Starting round	Final position	Record							
Competition	First match	Last match	Starting round	Final position	Pld	W	D	L	GF	GA	GD	Win %
Czech First League	22 August 2020	29 May 2021	Matchday 1	6th	34	14	10	10	44	32	+12	41.18
Czech Cup	11 February 2021	7 April 2021	Third round	Quarter-finals	3	2	0	1	4	2	+2	66.67
UEFA Europa League	22 October 2020	10 December 2020	Group stage	Group stage	6	2	1	3	4	13	−9	33.33
Total					43	18	11	14	52	47	+5	41.86

Last updated: 29 May 2021
Source: Soccerway

=== Czech First League ===
==== League table ====
Pos	Team	Pld	W	D	L	GF	GA	GD	Pts	Qualification or relegation
4	Slovácko	34	19	6	9	58	33	+25	63	Qualification for the Europa Conference League second qualifying round
5	Viktoria Plzeň	34	17	7	10	60	45	+15	58	Qualification for the Europa Conference League second qualifying round
6	Slovan Liberec	34	14	10	10	44	32	+12	52	
7	Pardubice	34	15	7	12	41	42	−1	52	
8	Baník Ostrava	34	13	10	11	48	38	+10	49	

Source: Fortuna Liga
Rules for classification: 1) Points; 2) Head-to-head points; 3) Head-to-head goal difference; 4) Head-to-head goals scored; 5) Goal difference; 6) Goals scored; 7) Fair-play ranking; 8) Draw.

==== Results summary ====
Overall								Home						Away					
Pld	W	D	L	GF	GA	GD	Pts	W	D	L	GF	GA	GD	W	D	L	GF	GA	GD
34	14	10	10	44	32	+12	52	7	7	3	27	15	+12	7	3	7	17	17	0

Last updated: See results.
Source: Fortuna Liga

==== Results by round ====
Round	1	2	3	4	5	6	7	8	9	10	11	12	13	14	15	16	17	18	19	20	21	22	23	24	25	26	27	28	29	30	31	32	33	34
Ground	A	H	A	H	A	H	A	H	A	H	A	H	H	A	H	A	H	A	H	A	H	A	H	A	H	A	H	A	A	H	A	H	A	H
Result	L	W	W	D	L	W	W	L	L	D	L	W	W	D	D	W	W	W	D	D	W	W	W	L	D	L	L	W	W	D	L	D	D	L
Position	12	7	5	6	7	5	5	7	9	11	11	9	8	8	6	6	5	5	5	5	5	4	4	5	5	5	6	6	6	6	6	6	6	6

Source: See results
A = Away; H = Home; W = Win; D = Draw; L = Loss

==== Matches ====
22 August 2020 1	Sigma Olomouc	1–0	Slovan Liberec	Olomouc
17:00 CEST (UTC+2)	González 16'	Report		Stadium: Andrův stadion Attendance: 2,216; Referee: Pavel Julinek

30 August 2020 2	Slovan Liberec	4–1	Viktoria Plzeň	Liberec
16:30 CEST (UTC+2)	Mosquera 4', 55', (yellow card) 33'; Helal 11'; Hromada 14'; Matoušek (yellow card) 75'; Rabušic (yellow card) 76'	Report	Čermák 34' (pen.), (yellow card) 39'; Mihálik (yellow card) 45'; Havel (yellow card) 57'; Hořava (yellow card) 72'; Hejda (yellow card) 78'; Bucha (yellow card) 80'	Stadium: Stadion u Nisy; Attendance: 2,488; Referee: Pavel Franek

12 September 2020 3	Dynamo České Budějovice	0–2	Slovan Liberec	České Budějovice
17:00 CEST (UTC+2)		Report	Mosquera 41'; Rabušic 48'	Stadium: Stadion Střelecký ostrov Attendance: 2,314; Referee: Emanuel Marek

20 September 2020 4	Slovan Liberec	1–1	Karviná	Liberec
15:30 CEST (UTC+2)	Mosquera 55'	Report	Santos 90'	Stadium: Stadion u Nisy; Attendance: 3,382; Referee: Jiří Musil

27 September 2020 5	Pardubice	3–0	Slovan Liberec	Pardubice
15:30 CEST (UTC+2)	Toml 31'; Pfeifer 44'; Hlavaty 61' (pen.)	Report		Stadium: Pod Vinicí; Attendance: 867; Referee: Pavel Orel

4 October 2020 6	Slovan Liberec	3–0	Příbram	Liberec
15:30 CEST (UTC+2)	Rabušic 64' (pen.), 76', 79' (pen.)	Report		Stadium: Stadion u Nisy; Attendance: 2,000; Referee: Zbynek Proske

8 November 2020 7	Teplice	1–2	Slovan Liberec	Teplice
14:00 CET (UTC+1)	Trubač 16'	Report	Kacharaba 14'; Pešek 24'	Stadium: Na Stínadlech; Attendance: 0 Referee: Ondrej Pechanec

20 November 2020 8	Slovan Liberec	1–3	Jablonec	Liberec
18:45 CET (UTC+1)	Mara 28'; Rondić (yellow card) 42'; Sadílek (yellow card) 80'; Mosquera (yellow card) 83'	Report	Koscelník 2' (o.g.); Krob (yellow card) 28'; Pilař (yellow card) 40'; Martinec (yellow card) 58'; Holík (yellow card) 61'; Schranz 71', (yellow card) 83'; Zelený 83'	Stadium: Stadion u Nisy; Attendance: 0 Referee: Miroslav Zelinka

7 December 2020 10	Slovan Liberec	1–1	Slovácko	Liberec
18:00 CET (UTC+1)	Rabušic 23' (pen.)	Report	Reinberk 59'	Stadium: Stadion u Nisy; Attendance: 0 Referee: Pavel Rejžek

13 December 2020 11	Slavia Prague	3–0	Slovan Liberec	Prague
18:30 CET (UTC+1)	Sima 23', 75'; Olayinka 45+1'	Report	Sadílek (yellow card) 11'; Helal (yellow card) 27'; Mosquera (yellow card) 68'	Stadium: Sinobo Stadium; Attendance: 0 Referee: Emanuel Marek

16 December 2020 12	Slovan Liberec	2–0	Opava	Liberec
14:00 CET (UTC+1)	Rabušic 2' (pen.); Kacharaba 39'	Report		Stadium: Stadion u Nisy; Attendance: 0 Referee: Karel Hrubeš

19 December 2020 13	Slovan Liberec	3–0	Mladá Boleslav	Liberec
16:00 CET (UTC+1)	Hromada 6'; Tatajev 29' (o.g.); Rondić 90' (pen.)	Report		Stadium: Stadion u Nisy; Attendance: 0 Referee: Jana Adámková

22 December 2020 14	Sparta Prague	1–1	Slovan Liberec	Prague
17:00 CET (UTC+1)	Dočkal (penalty missed) 28', (yellow card) 62'; Juliš (yellow card) 39', (goal) 48'; Souček (yellow card) 72'; Pavelka (yellow card) 75'	Report	Yusuf (yellow card) 4'; Kacharaba (yellow card) 27'; Mara 33' (pen.); Sadílek (yellow card) 57'	Stadium: Stadion Letná; Attendance: 0 Referee: Emanuel Marek

16 January 2021 15	Slovan Liberec	1–1	Bohemians 1905	Liberec
16:00 CET (UTC+1)	Mosquera 13'; Mikula (yellow card) 28'; Karafiát (yellow card) 80'	Report	Bederka (yellow card) 36'; Pulkrab 70'	Stadium: Stadion u Nisy; Attendance: 0 Referee: Ondřej Lerch

22 January 2021 16	Zbrojovka Brno	0–3	Slovan Liberec	Brno
18:00 CET (UTC+1)	Záhumenský (yellow card) 17'; Šural (yellow card) 64'; M. Vintr (yellow card) 83'	Report	Mosquera 25'; Rabušic 34'; Pešek 76'	Stadium: Wedos Arena; Attendance: 0 Referee: Emanuel Marek

27 January 2021 9	Baník Ostrava	1–0	Slovan Liberec	Ostrava
16:00 CET (UTC+1)	Zajíc 5'	Report		Stadium: Městský stadion Attendance: 0 Referee: Pavel Julinek

6 February 2021 18	Viktoria Plzeň	0–2	Slovan Liberec	Plzeň
18:30 CET (UTC+1)	Ba Loua (yellow card) 23'; Kaša (red card) 42'; Ondrášek (yellow card) 53'	Report	Koscelník (yellow card) 29'; Rondić 52'; Mara (yellow card) 66'; Karafiát (yellow card) 89'; Fukala (yellow card) 90'; Pešek 90+3'	Stadium: Doosan Arena; Attendance: 0 Referee: Miroslav Zelinka

14 February 2021 19	Slovan Liberec	0–0	Dynamo České Budějovice	Liberec
14:00 CET (UTC+1)		Report		Stadium: Stadion u Nisy; Attendance: 0 Referee: Pavel Orel

17 February 2021 17	Slovan Liberec	1–0	Fastav Zlín	Liberec
14:00 CET (UTC+1)	Rondić 69'	Report		Stadium: Stadion u Nisy; Attendance: 0 Referee: Ondrej Berka

21 February 2021 20	Karviná	1–1	Slovan Liberec	Karviná
14:00 CET (UTC+1)	Herc 60'	Report	Rondić 57'	Stadium: Městský stadion Attendance: 0 Referee: Karel Hrubeš

26 February 2021 21	Slovan Liberec	4–1	Pardubice	Liberec
18:00 CET (UTC+1)	Sadílek 6', 45'; Karafiát 13', 25'	Report	Huf 50'	Stadium: Stadion u Nisy; Attendance: 0 Referee: Ondrej Pechanec

6 March 2021 22	Příbram	0–2	Slovan Liberec	Příbram
14:00 CET (UTC+1)		Report	Pešek 61'; Sadílek 62'	Stadium: Na Litavce; Attendance: 0 Referee: Jan Petřík

12 March 2021 23	Slovan Liberec	2–1	Teplice	Liberec
18:00 CET (UTC+1)	Rabušic (penalty missed) 29', 77'; Karafiát (yellow card) 49'; Mara (yellow card) 52'; Mikula (yellow card) 69'; Rondić 90'	Report	Sadílek 13' (o.g.); Gabriel (yellow card) 57'; Mazuch (yellow card) 61'	Stadium: Stadion u Nisy; Attendance: 0 Referee: Petr Hocek

20 March 2021 24	Jablonec	2–1	Slovan Liberec	Jablonec nad Nisou
18:30 CET (UTC+1)	Schranz 17', (yellow card) 60'; Kubista 54'	Report	Rabušic 52' (pen.)	Stadium: Stadion Střelnice; Attendance: 0 Referee: Zbyněk Proske

3 April 2021 25	Slovan Liberec	0–0	Baník Ostrava	Liberec
16:00 CEST (UTC+2)	Mara (yellow card) 39'; Jugas (yellow card) 40'; Rondić (yellow card) 57'; Karafiát (yellow card) 68'; Mikula (yellow card) 80'	Report	Fillo (yellow card) 40'	Stadium: Stadion u Nisy; Attendance: 0 Referee: Miroslav Zelinka

10 April 2021 26	Slovácko	1–0	Slovan Liberec	Uherské Hradiště
18:30 CEST (UTC+2)	Hofmann (yellow card) 53'; Jurečka 66' (pen.); Divíšek (yellow card) 90+3'	Report	Chaluš (yellow card) 32'	Stadium: Městský fotbalový stadion Attendance: 0 Referee: Emanuel Marek

18 April 2021 27	Slovan Liberec	0–1	Slavia Prague	Liberec
16:00 CEST (UTC+2)	Karafiát (yellow card) 24'; Mara (yellow card) 44'; Sadílek (yellow card) 56'; Rabušic (yellow card) 60'; Pourzitidis (yellow card) 77'; Mosquera (yellow card) 86'	Report	Helal (yellow card) 31'; Hromada (yellow card) 48'; Kúdela 84' (pen.); Van Buren (yellow card) 90+1'	Stadium: Stadion u Nisy; Attendance: 0 Referee: Karel Hrubeš

21 April 2021 28	Opava	0–2	Slovan Liberec	Opava
15:00 CEST (UTC+2)	Rataj (yellow card) 9'; Hnanicek (yellow card) 13'; Hrabina (yellow card) 18'; Didiba (yellow card) 37'; Kulhánek (yellow card) 49'; Dedič (yellow card) 84'	Report	Rondić (yellow card) 22', (goal) 23'; Pešek (yellow card) 36'; Sadílek 39'; Mikula (yellow card) 86'	Stadium: Stadion v Městských sadech Attendance: 0 Referee: Radek Dubravsky

24 April 2021 29	Mladá Boleslav	0–1	Slovan Liberec	Mladá Boleslav
16:00 CEST (UTC+2)	Budínský (yellow card) 85'; Klíma (yellow card) 90'; Takács (yellow card) 90+3'	Report	Sadílek 26'; Knobloch (yellow card) 90+3'	Stadium: Lokotrans Aréna; Attendance: 0 Referee: Ondrej Berka

2 May 2021 30	Slovan Liberec	2–2	Sparta Prague	Liberec
17:00 CEST (UTC+2)	Pešek 30', 51'; Mikula (yellow card) 34'; Sadílek (yellow card) 40'; Rabušic (yellow card) 79'; Faško (yellow card) 88'	Report	Wiesner (yellow card) 41'; Karlsson 67'; Hložek 68'; Pavelka (yellow card) 87'	Stadium: Stadion u Nisy; Attendance: 850; Referee: Pavel Orel

8 May 2021 31	Bohemians 1905	3–0	Slovan Liberec	Prague
19:30 CEST (UTC+2)	Necid (yellow card) 25', (goal) 57'; Pulkrab (yellow card) 26', (goal) 51' (pen.); Květ (yellow card) 33'; Vondra (yellow card) 63'; Hronek 82'; Keita (yellow card) 85'	Report	Knobloch (yellow card) 50'; Rabušic (yellow card) 64'; Karafiát (yellow card) 68'	Stadium: Ďolíček; Attendance: 382; Referee: Jan Machálek

14 May 2021 32	Slovan Liberec	1–1	Zbrojovka Brno	Liberec
20:00 CEST (UTC+2)	Mara (penalty missed) 65'; Mosquera 77'	Report	Pernica (yellow card) 64'; Růsek 90+3'	Stadium: Stadion u Nisy; Attendance: 850; Referee: Ondřej Lerch

23 May 2021 33	Fastav Zlín	0–0	Slovan Liberec	Zlín
17:00 CEST (UTC+2)	Potočný (yellow card) 12'; Poznar (yellow card) 50'; Procházka (yellow card) 73'	Report	Karafiát (yellow card) 35'; Pešek (yellow card) 90'	Stadium: Letná Stadion; Attendance: 373; Referee: Zbyněk Proske

29 May 2021 34	Slovan Liberec	1–2	Sigma Olomouc	Liberec
17:00 CEST (UTC+2)	Rondić (yellow card) 13'; Karafiát (yellow card) 45+2'; Fukala (yellow card) 64'; Chaluš (yellow card) 71'; Sadílek 83'; Matoušek (yellow card) 90+2'	Report	Zmrzlý 33'; Chytil (yellow card) 71'; Kerbr 90+1' (pen.)	Stadium: Stadion u Nisy; Attendance: 784; Referee: Ondřej Berka

=== Czech Cup ===
11 February 2021 Third round	Slovan Liberec	3–1 (a.e.t.)	Viktoria Žižkov	Liberec
14:00 CET (UTC+1)	Faško 44'; Koscelník 94'; Rondić 99'	Report	Bazal 51'	Stadium: UMT Doubí; Attendance: 0 Referee: Ondřej Pechanec

3 March 2021 Fourth round	Slovan Liberec	1–0	Dynamo České Budějovice	Liberec
17:00 CET (UTC+1)	Pešek 89'	Report		Stadium: Stadion u Nisy; Attendance: 0 Referee: Toma Klima

7 April 2021 Quarter-finals	Viktoria Plzeň	1–0	Slovan Liberec	Plzeň
15:30 CEST (UTC+2)	Brabec (yellow card) 28'; Ba Loua (yellow card) 57'; Mihálik 87'	Report	Cancola (yellow card) 38'; Pešek (yellow card) 55'; Mikula (yellow card) 85'; Matoušek (yellow card) 88'	Stadium: Doosan Arena; Attendance: 0 Referee: Pavel Julínek

=== UEFA Europa League ===
==== Group stage ====
Pos	Team	Pld	W	D	L	GF	GA	GD	Pts	Qualification	HOF	ZVE	LIB	GNT
1	(Germany) TSG Hoffenheim	6	5	1	0	17	2	+15	16	Advance to knockout phase	—	2–0	5–0	4–1
2	(Serbia) Red Star Belgrade	6	3	2	1	9	4	+5	11	Advance to knockout phase	0–0	—	5–1	2–1
3	(Czech Republic) Slovan Liberec	6	2	1	3	4	13	−9	7		0–2	0–0	—	1–0
4	(Belgium) Gent	6	0	0	6	4	15	−11	0		1–4	0–2	1–2	—

Source: UEFA
Rules for classification: Group stage tiebreakers

22 October 2020 1	Slovan Liberec (Czech Republic)	1–0	(Belgium) Gent	Liberec, Czech Republic
21:00 CEST (UTC+2)	Helal 29'; Beran (yellow card) 45+1'	Report	Marreh (yellow card) 34'; Yaremchuk (yellow card) 68'; Hanche-Olsen (yellow card) 89'	Stadium: Stadion u Nisy; Attendance: 0 Referee: Manuel Schüttengruber (Austria)

29 October 2020 2	Red Star Belgrade (Serbia)	5–1	(Czech Republic) Slovan Liberec	Belgrade, Serbia
18:55 CET (UTC+1)	Ben 7', 22'; Gajić 50'; Katai 67'; Falcinelli 70'	Report	Matoušek 41'	Stadium: Red Star Stadium; Attendance: 0 Referee: Fábio Veríssimo (Portugal)

5 November 2020 3	1899 Hoffenheim (Germany)	5–0	(Czech Republic) Slovan Liberec	Sinsheim, Germany
21:00 CET (UTC+1)	Dabbur 22', 30'; Bogarde (yellow card) 36'; Grillitsch 59'; Adamyan 71', 76'	Report	Pourzitidis (yellow card) 28'; Koscelník (yellow card) 52'	Stadium: Rhein-Neckar-Arena; Attendance: 0 Referee: Sergei Karasev (Russia)

26 November 2020 4	Slovan Liberec (Czech Republic)	0–2	(Germany) 1899 Hoffenheim	Liberec, Czech Republic
18:55 CET (UTC+1)	Mikula (yellow card) 13'; Mara (yellow card) 88'; Koscelník (yellow card) 90+2'	Report	Bogarde (yellow card) 17'; Gaćinović (yellow card) 65'; Nordtveit (yellow card) 69'; Baumgartner 77'; Skov (yellow card) 81'; Kramarić 89' (pen.)	Stadium: Stadion u Nisy; Attendance: 0 Referee: Jérôme Brisard (France)

3 December 2020 5	Gent (Belgium)	1–2	(Czech Republic) Slovan Liberec	Ghent, Belgium
18:55 CET (UTC+1)	Mohammadi (yellow card) 52'; Yaremchuk 60', (yellow card) 90+6'; Kums (yellow card) 75'; Fortuna (yellow card) 85'; Bukari (yellow card) 90+2'	Report	Mara 32', (yellow card) 79'; Kacharaba 55'; Matoušek (yellow card) 85'; Sadílek (yellow card) 90+6'; Rabušic (yellow card) 90+6'	Stadium: Ghelamco Arena; Attendance: 0 Referee: Kateryna Monzul (Ukraine)

10 December 2020 6	Slovan Liberec (Czech Republic)	0–0	(Serbia) Red Star Belgrade	Liberec, Czech Republic
21:00 CET (UTC+1)	Helal (yellow card) 32'; Beran (yellow card) 51'	Report	Degenek (yellow card) 27'; Falcinelli (yellow card) 49'; Gobeljić (yellow card) 73'; Gajić (yellow card) 77'	Stadium: Stadion u Nisy; Attendance: 0 Referee: Mattias Gestranius (Finland)
