= UEFA Euro 2020 squads =

European football national squads

UEFA Euro 2020 was an international football tournament initially intended to be held across twelve cities in Europe from 12 June to 12 July 2020, but due to COVID-19 restrictions was delayed by a year to 11 June to 11 July 2021 and held across eleven cities. The 24 national teams involved in the tournament were required to register a squad of up to 26 players – of which three had to be goalkeepers – by 1 June 2021, 23:59 CEST (UTC+2), ten days prior to the opening match of the tournament. Only players in these squads were eligible to take part in the tournament.

In the event that a player on the submitted squad list suffered from an injury or illness prior to his team's first match of the tournament, that player could be replaced, provided that the team doctor and a doctor from the UEFA Medical Committee both confirmed that the injury or illness was severe enough to prevent the player from participating in the tournament. Should a goalkeeper have suffered from an injury or illness after his team's first match of the tournament, he could still be replaced, even if the other goalkeepers from the squad were still available. A player who had been replaced on the player list could not be readmitted to the list.

The position listed for each player is per the official squad lists published by UEFA. The age listed for each player is their age as of 11 June 2021, the first day of the tournament. The numbers of caps and goals listed for each player do not include any matches played after the start of the tournament. The club listed is the club for which the player last played a competitive match prior to the tournament. The nationality for each club reflects the national association (not the league) to which the club is affiliated. A flag is included for coaches who are of a different nationality to their team.

== Expansion of squad sizes ==
At the start of April 2021, UEFA stated they were considering allowing tournament squads to be expanded from the usual 23 players, used at every European Championship since 2004, following calls from national team managers in case of a possible COVID-19 outbreak in a team, as well as to reduce player fatigue caused by the fixture congestion of the prior season. On 27 April, it was reported that the UEFA National Team Competitions Committee had approved the expansion of squads to 26 players, subject to confirmation by the UEFA Executive Committee.

On 4 May 2021, the Executive Committee confirmed the use of 26-player squads. However, teams still could only name a maximum of 23 players on the match sheet for each tournament fixture (of which 12 were substitutes), in line with the Laws of the Game.

== COVID-19 protocol ==
Players who either tested positive for SARS-CoV-2 or had been declared as "close contacts" of a positive SARS-CoV-2 tested person – and therefore were put in isolation by the decision of health authorities – were considered cases of serious illness and could therefore be replaced before the first match.

If a group of players of a team were placed into mandatory quarantine or self-isolation prior to a match following a decision from national or local health officials due to positive SARS-CoV-2 tests, and fewer than 13 players were available (including at least one goalkeeper), additional players could have been called up to meet the minimum of 13 players required. In such a case, an equivalent number of quarantined players must have been definitively withdrawn from the 26-player list.

Any player who had been replaced on the player list after the submission deadline of 1 June 2021 could not be readmitted to the list.

== Group A ==
=== Italy ===
Manager: Roberto Mancini

Italy announced a 33-man preliminary squad on 17 May 2021. The squad was extended to 34 players on 25 May, then reduced to 28 players on 30 May (with two players added and eight removed). The final squad was announced on 2 June. Stefano Sensi withdrew injured and was replaced by Matteo Pessina on 7 June. Lorenzo Pellegrini withdrew injured and was replaced by Gaetano Castrovilli on 10 June.

No.	Pos.	Player	Date of birth (age)	Caps	Goals	Club
1	GK	Salvatore Sirigu	12 January 1987 (aged 34)	26	0	(Italian Football Federation) Torino
2	DF	Giovanni Di Lorenzo	4 August 1993 (aged 27)	7	0	(Italian Football Federation) Napoli
3	DF	Giorgio Chiellini (captain)	14 August 1984 (aged 36)	107	8	(Italian Football Federation) Juventus
4	DF	Leonardo Spinazzola	25 March 1993 (aged 28)	14	0	(Italian Football Federation) Roma
5	MF	Manuel Locatelli	8 January 1998 (aged 23)	10	1	(Italian Football Federation) Sassuolo
6	MF	Marco Verratti	5 November 1992 (aged 28)	40	3	(French Football Federation) Paris Saint-Germain
7	MF	Gaetano Castrovilli	17 February 1997 (aged 24)	2	0	(Italian Football Federation) Fiorentina
8	MF	Jorginho	20 December 1991 (aged 29)	28	5	(The Football Association) Chelsea
9	FW	Andrea Belotti	20 December 1993 (aged 27)	33	12	(Italian Football Federation) Torino
10	FW	Lorenzo Insigne	4 June 1991 (aged 30)	41	8	(Italian Football Federation) Napoli
11	FW	Domenico Berardi	1 August 1994 (aged 26)	11	5	(Italian Football Federation) Sassuolo
12	MF	Matteo Pessina	21 April 1997 (aged 24)	5	2	(Italian Football Federation) Atalanta
13	DF	Emerson Palmieri	3 August 1994 (aged 26)	15	0	(The Football Association) Chelsea
14	MF	Federico Chiesa	25 October 1997 (aged 23)	25	1	(Italian Football Federation) Juventus
15	DF	Francesco Acerbi	10 February 1988 (aged 33)	14	1	(Italian Football Federation) Lazio
16	MF	Bryan Cristante	3 March 1995 (aged 26)	11	1	(Italian Football Federation) Roma
17	FW	Ciro Immobile	20 February 1990 (aged 31)	46	13	(Italian Football Federation) Lazio
18	MF	Nicolò Barella	7 February 1997 (aged 24)	23	5	(Italian Football Federation) Internazionale
19	DF	Leonardo Bonucci	1 May 1987 (aged 34)	102	7	(Italian Football Federation) Juventus
20	MF	Federico Bernardeschi	16 February 1994 (aged 27)	30	6	(Italian Football Federation) Juventus
21	GK	Gianluigi Donnarumma	25 February 1999 (aged 22)	26	0	(Italian Football Federation) Milan
22	FW	Giacomo Raspadori	18 February 2000 (aged 21)	1	0	(Italian Football Federation) Sassuolo
23	DF	Alessandro Bastoni	13 April 1999 (aged 22)	5	0	(Italian Football Federation) Internazionale
24	DF	Alessandro Florenzi	11 March 1991 (aged 30)	43	2	(French Football Federation) Paris Saint-Germain
25	DF	Rafael Tolói	10 October 1990 (aged 30)	3	0	(Italian Football Federation) Atalanta
26	GK	Alex Meret	22 March 1997 (aged 24)	2	0	(Italian Football Federation) Napoli

=== Switzerland ===
Manager: Vladimir Petković

Switzerland announced a 29-man preliminary squad on 19 May 2021. The final squad was announced on 31 May. After the team's first match, goalkeeper Jonas Omlin withdrew injured and was replaced by Gregor Kobel on 13 June.

No.	Pos.	Player	Date of birth (age)	Caps	Goals	Club
1	GK	Yann Sommer	17 December 1988 (aged 32)	61	0	(German Football Association) Borussia Mönchengladbach
2	DF	Kevin Mbabu	19 April 1995 (aged 26)	12	0	(German Football Association) VfL Wolfsburg
3	DF	Silvan Widmer	5 March 1993 (aged 28)	16	1	(Swiss Football Association) Basel
4	DF	Nico Elvedi	30 September 1996 (aged 24)	26	1	(German Football Association) Borussia Mönchengladbach
5	DF	Manuel Akanji	19 July 1995 (aged 25)	29	0	(German Football Association) Borussia Dortmund
6	MF	Denis Zakaria	20 November 1996 (aged 24)	32	3	(German Football Association) Borussia Mönchengladbach
7	FW	Breel Embolo	14 February 1997 (aged 24)	43	5	(German Football Association) Borussia Mönchengladbach
8	MF	Remo Freuler	15 April 1992 (aged 29)	29	3	(Italian Football Federation) Atalanta
9	FW	Haris Seferovic	22 February 1992 (aged 29)	74	21	(Portuguese Football Federation) Benfica
10	MF	Granit Xhaka (captain)	27 September 1992 (aged 28)	94	12	(The Football Association) Arsenal
11	MF	Rubén Vargas	5 August 1998 (aged 22)	12	2	(German Football Association) FC Augsburg
12	GK	Yvon Mvogo	6 June 1994 (aged 27)	4	0	(Royal Dutch Football Association) PSV Eindhoven
13	DF	Ricardo Rodriguez	25 August 1992 (aged 28)	81	9	(Italian Football Federation) Torino
14	MF	Steven Zuber	17 August 1991 (aged 29)	37	8	(German Football Association) Eintracht Frankfurt
15	MF	Djibril Sow	6 February 1997 (aged 24)	16	0	(German Football Association) Eintracht Frankfurt
16	MF	Christian Fassnacht	11 November 1993 (aged 27)	8	3	(Swiss Football Association) Young Boys
17	DF	Loris Benito	7 January 1992 (aged 29)	12	1	(French Football Federation) Bordeaux
18	FW	Admir Mehmedi	16 March 1991 (aged 30)	74	10	(German Football Association) VfL Wolfsburg
19	FW	Mario Gavranović	24 November 1989 (aged 31)	30	14	(Croatian Football Federation) Dinamo Zagreb
20	MF	Edimilson Fernandes	15 April 1996 (aged 25)	22	2	(German Football Association) Mainz 05
21	GK	Jonas Omlin (until 13 June)	10 January 1994 (aged 27)	2	0	(French Football Federation) Montpellier
21	GK	Gregor Kobel (from 13 June)	6 December 1997 (aged 23)	0	0	(German Football Association) VfB Stuttgart
22	DF	Fabian Schär	20 December 1991 (aged 29)	60	8	(The Football Association) Newcastle United
23	MF	Xherdan Shaqiri	10 October 1991 (aged 29)	91	23	(The Football Association) Liverpool
24	DF	Bećir Omeragić	20 January 2002 (aged 19)	4	0	(Swiss Football Association) Zürich
25	DF	Eray Cömert	4 February 1998 (aged 23)	6	0	(Swiss Football Association) Basel
26	DF	Jordan Lotomba	29 September 1998 (aged 22)	2	0	(French Football Federation) Nice

=== Turkey ===
Manager: Şenol Güneş

Turkey announced a 30-man preliminary squad on 14 May 2021. The final squad was announced on 1 June.

No.	Pos.	Player	Date of birth (age)	Caps	Goals	Club
1	GK	Mert Günok	1 March 1989 (aged 32)	22	0	(Turkish Football Federation) İstanbul Başakşehir
2	DF	Zeki Çelik	17 February 1997 (aged 24)	20	2	(French Football Federation) Lille
3	DF	Merih Demiral	5 March 1998 (aged 23)	21	0	(Italian Football Federation) Juventus
4	DF	Çağlar Söyüncü	23 May 1996 (aged 25)	35	2	(The Football Association) Leicester City
5	MF	Okay Yokuşlu	9 March 1994 (aged 27)	34	1	(The Football Association) West Bromwich Albion
6	MF	Ozan Tufan	23 March 1995 (aged 26)	60	9	(Turkish Football Federation) Fenerbahçe
7	FW	Cengiz Ünder	14 July 1997 (aged 23)	29	9	(The Football Association) Leicester City
8	MF	Dorukhan Toköz	21 May 1996 (aged 25)	9	1	(Turkish Football Federation) Beşiktaş
9	FW	Kenan Karaman	5 March 1994 (aged 27)	22	5	(German Football Association) Fortuna Düsseldorf
10	MF	Hakan Çalhanoğlu	8 February 1994 (aged 27)	56	13	(Italian Football Federation) Milan
11	FW	Yusuf Yazıcı	29 January 1997 (aged 24)	31	1	(French Football Federation) Lille
12	GK	Altay Bayındır	14 April 1998 (aged 23)	1	0	(Turkish Football Federation) Fenerbahçe
13	DF	Umut Meraş	20 December 1995 (aged 25)	13	0	(French Football Federation) Le Havre
14	MF	Taylan Antalyalı	8 January 1995 (aged 26)	6	0	(Turkish Football Federation) Galatasaray
15	DF	Ozan Kabak	25 March 2000 (aged 21)	12	0	(The Football Association) Liverpool
16	FW	Enes Ünal	10 May 1997 (aged 24)	22	2	(Royal Spanish Football Federation) Getafe
17	FW	Burak Yılmaz (captain)	15 July 1985 (aged 35)	67	29	(French Football Federation) Lille
18	DF	Rıdvan Yılmaz	21 May 2001 (aged 20)	2	0	(Turkish Football Federation) Beşiktaş
19	MF	Orkun Kökçü	29 December 2000 (aged 20)	6	0	(Royal Dutch Football Association) Feyenoord
20	MF	Abdülkadir Ömür	25 June 1999 (aged 21)	9	0	(Turkish Football Federation) Trabzonspor
21	MF	İrfan Kahveci	15 July 1995 (aged 25)	18	0	(Turkish Football Federation) Fenerbahçe
22	DF	Kaan Ayhan	10 November 1994 (aged 26)	37	4	(Italian Football Federation) Sassuolo
23	GK	Uğurcan Çakır	5 April 1996 (aged 25)	8	0	(Turkish Football Federation) Trabzonspor
24	MF	Kerem Aktürkoğlu	21 October 1998 (aged 22)	1	0	(Turkish Football Federation) Galatasaray
25	DF	Mert Müldür	3 April 1999 (aged 22)	8	0	(Italian Football Federation) Sassuolo
26	MF	Halil Dervişoğlu	8 December 1999 (aged 21)	2	1	(Turkish Football Federation) Galatasaray

=== Wales ===
Manager: Rob Page

Wales announced on 23 April 2021 that Rob Page would act as manager for the tournament, after regular manager Ryan Giggs was charged by the Crown Prosecution Service. The team announced a 28-man preliminary squad on 24 May. The final squad was announced on 30 May. James Lawrence withdrew injured and was replaced by Tom Lockyer on 31 May.

No.	Pos.	Player	Date of birth (age)	Caps	Goals	Club
1	GK	Wayne Hennessey	24 January 1987 (aged 34)	96	0	(The Football Association) Crystal Palace
2	DF	Chris Gunter	21 July 1989 (aged 31)	101	0	(The Football Association) Charlton Athletic
3	DF	Neco Williams	13 April 2001 (aged 20)	11	1	(The Football Association) Liverpool
4	DF	Ben Davies	24 April 1993 (aged 28)	60	0	(The Football Association) Tottenham Hotspur
5	DF	Tom Lockyer	3 December 1994 (aged 26)	13	0	(The Football Association) Luton Town
6	DF	Joe Rodon	22 October 1997 (aged 23)	14	0	(The Football Association) Tottenham Hotspur
7	MF	Joe Allen	14 March 1990 (aged 31)	59	2	(The Football Association) Stoke City
8	MF	Harry Wilson	22 March 1997 (aged 24)	26	5	(Football Association of Wales) Cardiff City
9	FW	Tyler Roberts	12 January 1999 (aged 22)	14	0	(The Football Association) Leeds United
10	MF	Aaron Ramsey	26 December 1990 (aged 30)	63	16	(Italian Football Federation) Juventus
11	FW	Gareth Bale (captain)	16 July 1989 (aged 31)	92	33	(The Football Association) Tottenham Hotspur
12	GK	Danny Ward	22 June 1993 (aged 27)	13	0	(The Football Association) Leicester City
13	FW	Kieffer Moore	8 August 1992 (aged 28)	17	5	(Football Association of Wales) Cardiff City
14	DF	Connor Roberts	23 September 1995 (aged 25)	26	1	(Football Association of Wales) Swansea City
15	DF	Ethan Ampadu	14 September 2000 (aged 20)	23	0	(The Football Association) Sheffield United
16	MF	Joe Morrell	3 January 1997 (aged 24)	15	0	(The Football Association) Luton Town
17	DF	Rhys Norrington-Davies	22 April 1999 (aged 22)	5	0	(The Football Association) Stoke City
18	MF	Jonny Williams	9 October 1993 (aged 27)	28	1	(Football Association of Wales) Cardiff City
19	MF	David Brooks	8 July 1997 (aged 23)	18	2	(The Football Association) Bournemouth
20	MF	Daniel James	10 November 1997 (aged 23)	20	4	(The Football Association) Manchester United
21	GK	Adam Davies	17 July 1992 (aged 28)	2	0	(The Football Association) Stoke City
22	DF	Chris Mepham	5 November 1997 (aged 23)	18	0	(The Football Association) Bournemouth
23	MF	Dylan Levitt	17 November 2000 (aged 20)	8	0	(Croatian Football Federation) Istra 1961
24	DF	Ben Cabango	30 May 2000 (aged 21)	3	0	(Football Association of Wales) Swansea City
25	MF	Rubin Colwill	27 April 2002 (aged 19)	1	0	(Football Association of Wales) Cardiff City
26	MF	Matthew Smith	22 November 1999 (aged 21)	14	0	(The Football Association) Doncaster Rovers

== Group B ==
=== Belgium ===
Manager: (Spain) Roberto Martínez

Belgium announced their final squad on 17 May 2021. Timothy Castagne left the squad on 15 June due to injury. After the team's round of 16 match, goalkeeper Simon Mignolet withdrew injured and was replaced by Thomas Kaminski on 28 June.

No.	Pos.	Player	Date of birth (age)	Caps	Goals	Club
1	GK	Thibaut Courtois	11 May 1992 (aged 29)	84	0	(Royal Spanish Football Federation) Real Madrid
2	DF	Toby Alderweireld	2 March 1989 (aged 32)	109	5	(The Football Association) Tottenham Hotspur
3	DF	Thomas Vermaelen	14 November 1985 (aged 35)	80	2	(Japan Football Association) Vissel Kobe
4	DF	Dedryck Boyata	28 November 1990 (aged 30)	23	0	(German Football Association) Hertha BSC
5	DF	Jan Vertonghen	24 April 1987 (aged 34)	127	9	(Portuguese Football Federation) Benfica
6	MF	Axel Witsel	12 January 1989 (aged 32)	110	10	(German Football Association) Borussia Dortmund
7	MF	Kevin De Bruyne	28 June 1991 (aged 29)	80	21	(The Football Association) Manchester City
8	MF	Youri Tielemans	7 May 1997 (aged 24)	39	4	(The Football Association) Leicester City
9	FW	Romelu Lukaku	13 May 1993 (aged 28)	93	60	(Italian Football Federation) Internazionale
10	MF	Eden Hazard (captain)	7 January 1991 (aged 30)	107	32	(Royal Spanish Football Federation) Real Madrid
11	MF	Yannick Carrasco	4 September 1993 (aged 27)	46	6	(Royal Spanish Football Federation) Atlético Madrid
12	GK	Simon Mignolet (until 28 June)	6 March 1988 (aged 33)	31	0	(Royal Belgian Football Association) Club Brugge
12	GK	Thomas Kaminski (from 28 June)	23 October 1992 (aged 28)	0	0	(The Football Association) Blackburn Rovers
13	GK	Matz Sels	26 February 1992 (aged 29)	1	0	(French Football Federation) Strasbourg
14	FW	Dries Mertens	6 May 1987 (aged 34)	98	21	(Italian Football Federation) Napoli
15	DF	Thomas Meunier	12 September 1991 (aged 29)	47	7	(German Football Association) Borussia Dortmund
16	MF	Thorgan Hazard	29 March 1993 (aged 28)	35	6	(German Football Association) Borussia Dortmund
17	MF	Hans Vanaken	24 August 1992 (aged 28)	10	2	(Royal Belgian Football Association) Club Brugge
18	DF	Jason Denayer	28 June 1995 (aged 25)	25	1	(French Football Federation) Lyon
19	MF	Leander Dendoncker	15 April 1995 (aged 26)	17	0	(The Football Association) Wolverhampton Wanderers
20	FW	Christian Benteke	3 December 1990 (aged 30)	39	16	(The Football Association) Crystal Palace
21	DF	Timothy Castagne	5 December 1995 (aged 25)	14	2	(The Football Association) Leicester City
22	MF	Nacer Chadli	2 August 1989 (aged 31)	64	8	(Turkish Football Federation) İstanbul Başakşehir
23	FW	Michy Batshuayi	2 October 1993 (aged 27)	34	22	(The Football Association) Crystal Palace
24	FW	Leandro Trossard	4 December 1994 (aged 26)	7	2	(The Football Association) Brighton & Hove Albion
25	FW	Jérémy Doku	27 May 2002 (aged 19)	8	2	(French Football Federation) Rennes
26	MF	Dennis Praet	14 May 1994 (aged 27)	11	1	(The Football Association) Leicester City

=== Denmark ===
Manager: Kasper Hjulmand

Denmark announced their final squad on 25 May 2021.

No.	Pos.	Player	Date of birth (age)	Caps	Goals	Club
1	GK	Kasper Schmeichel	5 November 1986 (aged 34)	65	0	(The Football Association) Leicester City
2	DF	Joachim Andersen	31 May 1996 (aged 25)	5	0	(The Football Association) Fulham
3	DF	Jannik Vestergaard	3 August 1992 (aged 28)	22	1	(The Football Association) Southampton
4	DF	Simon Kjær (captain)	26 March 1989 (aged 32)	107	3	(Italian Football Federation) Milan
5	DF	Joakim Mæhle	20 May 1997 (aged 24)	10	2	(Italian Football Federation) Atalanta
6	DF	Andreas Christensen	10 April 1996 (aged 25)	41	1	(The Football Association) Chelsea
7	MF	Robert Skov	20 May 1996 (aged 25)	10	5	(German Football Association) 1899 Hoffenheim
8	MF	Thomas Delaney	3 September 1991 (aged 29)	54	5	(German Football Association) Borussia Dortmund
9	FW	Martin Braithwaite	5 June 1991 (aged 30)	50	9	(Royal Spanish Football Federation) Barcelona
10	MF	Christian Eriksen	14 February 1992 (aged 29)	108	36	(Italian Football Federation) Internazionale
11	FW	Andreas Skov Olsen	29 December 1999 (aged 21)	6	3	(Italian Football Federation) Bologna
12	FW	Kasper Dolberg	6 October 1997 (aged 23)	26	7	(French Football Federation) Nice
13	DF	Mathias Jørgensen	23 April 1990 (aged 31)	35	2	(Danish Football Association) Copenhagen
14	FW	Mikkel Damsgaard	3 July 2000 (aged 20)	3	2	(Italian Football Federation) Sampdoria
15	MF	Christian Nørgaard	10 March 1994 (aged 27)	4	0	(The Football Association) Brentford
16	GK	Jonas Lössl	1 February 1989 (aged 32)	1	0	(Danish Football Association) Midtjylland
17	DF	Jens Stryger Larsen	21 February 1991 (aged 30)	36	2	(Italian Football Federation) Udinese
18	MF	Daniel Wass	31 May 1989 (aged 32)	30	0	(Royal Spanish Football Federation) Valencia
19	FW	Jonas Wind	7 February 1999 (aged 22)	7	3	(Danish Football Association) Copenhagen
20	FW	Yussuf Poulsen	15 June 1994 (aged 26)	54	8	(German Football Association) RB Leipzig
21	FW	Andreas Cornelius	16 March 1993 (aged 28)	28	6	(Italian Football Federation) Parma
22	GK	Frederik Rønnow	4 August 1992 (aged 28)	8	0	(German Football Association) Schalke 04
23	MF	Pierre-Emile Højbjerg	5 August 1995 (aged 25)	41	4	(The Football Association) Tottenham Hotspur
24	MF	Mathias Jensen	1 January 1996 (aged 25)	6	1	(The Football Association) Brentford
25	MF	Anders Christiansen	8 June 1990 (aged 31)	4	0	(Swedish Football Association) Malmö FF
26	DF	Nicolai Boilesen	16 February 1992 (aged 29)	20	1	(Danish Football Association) Copenhagen

=== Finland ===
Manager: Markku Kanerva

Finland announced a 26-man preliminary squad on 19 May 2021. The squad was extended to 28 players on 23 May, and further extended to 29 players on 25 May. The final squad was announced on 1 June. Sauli Väisänen withdrew injured and was replaced by Niko Hämäläinen on 3 June.

No.	Pos.	Player	Date of birth (age)	Caps	Goals	Club
1	GK	Lukas Hradecky	24 November 1989 (aged 31)	65	0	(German Football Association) Bayer Leverkusen
2	DF	Paulus Arajuuri	15 June 1988 (aged 32)	51	3	(Cyprus Football Association) Pafos
3	DF	Daniel O'Shaughnessy	14 September 1994 (aged 26)	11	0	(Football Association of Finland) HJK
4	DF	Joona Toivio	10 March 1988 (aged 33)	73	3	(Swedish Football Association) BK Häcken
5	DF	Leo Väisänen	23 July 1997 (aged 23)	8	0	(Swedish Football Association) IF Elfsborg
6	MF	Glen Kamara	28 October 1995 (aged 25)	31	1	(Scottish Football Association) Rangers
7	MF	Robert Taylor	21 October 1994 (aged 26)	19	1	(Norwegian Football Federation) Brann
8	MF	Robin Lod	17 April 1993 (aged 28)	43	4	(United States Soccer Federation) Minnesota United FC
9	MF	Fredrik Jensen	9 September 1997 (aged 23)	18	7	(German Football Association) FC Augsburg
10	FW	Teemu Pukki	29 March 1990 (aged 31)	91	30	(The Football Association) Norwich City
11	MF	Rasmus Schüller	18 June 1991 (aged 29)	49	0	(Swedish Football Association) Djurgårdens IF
12	GK	Jesse Joronen	21 March 1993 (aged 28)	14	0	(Italian Football Federation) Brescia
13	MF	Pyry Soiri	22 September 1994 (aged 26)	31	5	(Danish Football Association) Esbjerg
14	MF	Tim Sparv (captain)	20 February 1987 (aged 34)	81	1	(Hellenic Football Federation) AEL
15	DF	Niko Hämäläinen	5 March 1997 (aged 24)	7	0	(The Football Association) Queens Park Rangers
16	DF	Thomas Lam	18 December 1993 (aged 27)	26	0	(Royal Dutch Football Association) PEC Zwolle
17	MF	Nikolai Alho	12 March 1993 (aged 28)	12	0	(Hungarian Football Federation) MTK Budapest
18	DF	Jere Uronen	13 July 1994 (aged 26)	49	1	(Royal Belgian Football Association) Genk
19	MF	Joni Kauko	12 July 1990 (aged 30)	25	0	(Danish Football Association) Esbjerg
20	FW	Joel Pohjanpalo	13 September 1994 (aged 26)	42	9	(German Football Association) Union Berlin
21	FW	Lassi Lappalainen	24 August 1998 (aged 22)	8	0	(Canadian Soccer Association) CF Montréal
22	DF	Jukka Raitala	15 September 1988 (aged 32)	52	0	(United States Soccer Federation) Minnesota United FC
23	GK	Anssi Jaakkola	13 March 1987 (aged 34)	3	0	(The Football Association) Bristol Rovers
24	MF	Onni Valakari	18 August 1999 (aged 21)	5	1	(Cyprus Football Association) Pafos
25	DF	Robert Ivanov	19 September 1994 (aged 26)	4	0	(Polish Football Association) Warta Poznań
26	FW	Marcus Forss	18 June 1999 (aged 21)	5	1	(The Football Association) Brentford

=== Russia ===
Manager: Stanislav Cherchesov

Russia announced a 30-man preliminary squad on 11 May 2021. The final squad was announced on 2 June. Andrei Mostovoy withdrew after testing positive for SARS-CoV-2 and was replaced by Roman Yevgenyev on 11 June. Yuri Zhirkov left the squad on 15 June due to injury.

No.	Pos.	Player	Date of birth (age)	Caps	Goals	Club
1	GK	Anton Shunin	27 January 1987 (aged 34)	12	0	(Russian Football Union) Dynamo Moscow
2	DF	Mário Fernandes	19 September 1990 (aged 30)	29	5	(Russian Football Union) CSKA Moscow
3	DF	Igor Diveyev	27 September 1999 (aged 21)	4	0	(Russian Football Union) CSKA Moscow
4	DF	Vyacheslav Karavayev	20 May 1995 (aged 26)	13	2	(Russian Football Union) Zenit Saint Petersburg
5	DF	Andrei Semyonov	24 March 1989 (aged 32)	26	0	(Russian Football Union) Akhmat Grozny
6	MF	Denis Cheryshev	26 December 1990 (aged 30)	30	12	(Royal Spanish Football Federation) Valencia
7	MF	Magomed Ozdoyev	5 November 1992 (aged 28)	32	4	(Russian Football Union) Zenit Saint Petersburg
8	MF	Dmitri Barinov	11 September 1996 (aged 24)	5	0	(Russian Football Union) Lokomotiv Moscow
9	FW	Aleksandr Sobolev	7 March 1997 (aged 24)	6	3	(Russian Football Union) Spartak Moscow
10	FW	Anton Zabolotny	13 June 1991 (aged 29)	13	1	(Russian Football Union) Sochi
11	MF	Roman Zobnin	11 February 1994 (aged 27)	35	0	(Russian Football Union) Spartak Moscow
12	GK	Yury Dyupin	17 March 1988 (aged 33)	0	0	(Russian Football Union) Rubin Kazan
13	DF	Fyodor Kudryashov	5 April 1987 (aged 34)	44	1	(Turkish Football Federation) Antalyaspor
14	DF	Georgi Dzhikiya	21 November 1993 (aged 27)	33	1	(Russian Football Union) Spartak Moscow
15	MF	Aleksei Miranchuk	17 October 1995 (aged 25)	33	5	(Italian Football Federation) Atalanta
16	GK	Matvei Safonov	25 February 1999 (aged 22)	1	0	(Russian Football Union) Krasnodar
17	MF	Aleksandr Golovin	30 May 1996 (aged 25)	38	5	(French Football Federation) Monaco
18	MF	Yuri Zhirkov	20 August 1983 (aged 37)	104	2	(Russian Football Union) Zenit Saint Petersburg
19	MF	Rifat Zhemaletdinov	20 September 1996 (aged 24)	4	0	(Russian Football Union) Lokomotiv Moscow
20	MF	Aleksei Ionov	18 February 1989 (aged 32)	35	4	(Russian Football Union) Krasnodar
21	MF	Daniil Fomin	2 March 1997 (aged 24)	4	0	(Russian Football Union) Dynamo Moscow
22	FW	Artem Dzyuba (captain)	22 August 1988 (aged 32)	52	29	(Russian Football Union) Zenit Saint Petersburg
23	MF	Daler Kuzyayev	15 January 1993 (aged 28)	34	2	(Russian Football Union) Zenit Saint Petersburg
24	DF	Roman Yevgenyev	23 February 1999 (aged 22)	1	0	(Russian Football Union) Dynamo Moscow
25	MF	Denis Makarov	18 February 1998 (aged 23)	0	0	(Russian Football Union) Rubin Kazan
26	MF	Maksim Mukhin	4 November 2001 (aged 19)	2	0	(Russian Football Union) Lokomotiv Moscow

== Group C ==
=== Austria ===
Manager: (Germany) Franco Foda

Austria announced a 30-man preliminary squad on 19 May 2021. The final squad was announced on 24 May.

No.	Pos.	Player	Date of birth (age)	Caps	Goals	Club
1	GK	Alexander Schlager	1 February 1996 (aged 25)	6	0	(Austrian Football Association) LASK
2	DF	Andreas Ulmer	30 October 1985 (aged 35)	24	0	(Austrian Football Association) Red Bull Salzburg
3	DF	Aleksandar Dragović	6 March 1991 (aged 30)	90	2	(German Football Association) Bayer Leverkusen
4	DF	Martin Hinteregger	7 September 1992 (aged 28)	55	4	(German Football Association) Eintracht Frankfurt
5	DF	Stefan Posch	14 May 1997 (aged 24)	11	1	(German Football Association) 1899 Hoffenheim
6	MF	Stefan Ilsanker	18 May 1989 (aged 32)	51	0	(German Football Association) Eintracht Frankfurt
7	FW	Marko Arnautović	19 April 1989 (aged 32)	88	26	(Chinese Football Association) Shanghai Port
8	DF	David Alaba	24 June 1992 (aged 28)	81	14	(German Football Association) Bayern Munich
9	MF	Marcel Sabitzer	17 March 1994 (aged 27)	50	8	(German Football Association) RB Leipzig
10	MF	Florian Grillitsch	7 August 1995 (aged 25)	23	1	(German Football Association) 1899 Hoffenheim
11	FW	Michael Gregoritsch	18 April 1994 (aged 27)	26	4	(German Football Association) FC Augsburg
12	GK	Pavao Pervan	13 November 1987 (aged 33)	7	0	(German Football Association) VfL Wolfsburg
13	GK	Daniel Bachmann	9 July 1994 (aged 26)	2	0	(The Football Association) Watford
14	MF	Julian Baumgartlinger (captain)	2 January 1988 (aged 33)	83	1	(German Football Association) Bayer Leverkusen
15	DF	Philipp Lienhart	11 July 1996 (aged 24)	4	0	(German Football Association) SC Freiburg
16	MF	Christopher Trimmel	24 February 1987 (aged 34)	13	0	(German Football Association) Union Berlin
17	MF	Louis Schaub	29 December 1994 (aged 26)	21	6	(Swiss Football Association) Luzern
18	MF	Alessandro Schöpf	7 February 1994 (aged 27)	26	5	(German Football Association) Schalke 04
19	MF	Christoph Baumgartner	1 August 1999 (aged 21)	10	3	(German Football Association) 1899 Hoffenheim
20	MF	Karim Onisiwo	17 March 1992 (aged 29)	11	1	(German Football Association) Mainz 05
21	DF	Stefan Lainer	27 August 1992 (aged 28)	29	1	(German Football Association) Borussia Mönchengladbach
22	MF	Valentino Lazaro	24 March 1996 (aged 25)	31	3	(German Football Association) Borussia Mönchengladbach
23	MF	Xaver Schlager	28 September 1997 (aged 23)	20	1	(German Football Association) VfL Wolfsburg
24	MF	Konrad Laimer	27 May 1997 (aged 24)	9	1	(German Football Association) RB Leipzig
25	FW	Saša Kalajdžić	7 July 1997 (aged 23)	7	3	(German Football Association) VfB Stuttgart
26	DF	Marco Friedl	16 March 1998 (aged 23)	3	0	(German Football Association) Werder Bremen

=== Netherlands ===
Manager: Frank de Boer

The Netherlands announced a 34-man preliminary squad on 14 May 2021. The final squad was announced on 26 May. Jasper Cillessen withdrew after testing positive for COVID-19 and was replaced by Marco Bizot on 1 June. Donny van de Beek withdrew injured on 8 June and was not replaced, thus reducing the squad to 25 players.

No.	Pos.	Player	Date of birth (age)	Caps	Goals	Club
1	GK	Maarten Stekelenburg	22 September 1982 (aged 38)	59	0	(Royal Dutch Football Association) Ajax
2	DF	Joël Veltman	15 January 1992 (aged 29)	27	2	(The Football Association) Brighton & Hove Albion
3	DF	Matthijs de Ligt	12 August 1999 (aged 21)	27	2	(Italian Football Federation) Juventus
4	DF	Nathan Aké	18 February 1995 (aged 26)	20	2	(The Football Association) Manchester City
5	DF	Owen Wijndal	28 November 1999 (aged 21)	9	0	(Royal Dutch Football Association) AZ
6	DF	Stefan de Vrij	5 February 1992 (aged 29)	45	3	(Italian Football Federation) Internazionale
7	FW	Steven Berghuis	19 December 1991 (aged 29)	26	2	(Royal Dutch Football Association) Feyenoord
8	MF	Georginio Wijnaldum (captain)	11 November 1990 (aged 30)	75	22	(The Football Association) Liverpool
9	FW	Luuk de Jong	27 August 1990 (aged 30)	36	8	(Royal Spanish Football Federation) Sevilla
10	FW	Memphis Depay	13 February 1994 (aged 27)	64	26	(French Football Federation) Lyon
11	MF	Quincy Promes	4 January 1992 (aged 29)	48	7	(Russian Football Union) Spartak Moscow
12	DF	Patrick van Aanholt	29 August 1990 (aged 30)	15	0	(The Football Association) Crystal Palace
13	GK	Tim Krul	3 April 1988 (aged 33)	15	0	(The Football Association) Norwich City
14	MF	Davy Klaassen	21 February 1993 (aged 28)	24	5	(Royal Dutch Football Association) Ajax
15	MF	Marten de Roon	29 March 1991 (aged 30)	23	0	(Italian Football Federation) Atalanta
16	MF	Ryan Gravenberch	16 May 2002 (aged 19)	5	1	(Royal Dutch Football Association) Ajax
17	DF	Daley Blind	9 March 1990 (aged 31)	78	2	(Royal Dutch Football Association) Ajax
18	FW	Donyell Malen	19 January 1999 (aged 22)	9	2	(Royal Dutch Football Association) PSV Eindhoven
19	FW	Wout Weghorst	7 August 1992 (aged 28)	6	1	(German Football Association) VfL Wolfsburg
21	MF	Frenkie de Jong	12 May 1997 (aged 24)	27	1	(Royal Spanish Football Federation) Barcelona
22	DF	Denzel Dumfries	18 April 1996 (aged 25)	19	0	(Royal Dutch Football Association) PSV Eindhoven
23	GK	Marco Bizot	10 March 1991 (aged 30)	1	0	(Royal Dutch Football Association) AZ
24	MF	Teun Koopmeiners	28 February 1998 (aged 23)	1	0	(Royal Dutch Football Association) AZ
25	MF	Jurriën Timber	17 June 2001 (aged 19)	2	0	(Royal Dutch Football Association) Ajax
26	FW	Cody Gakpo	7 May 1999 (aged 22)	0	0	(Royal Dutch Football Association) PSV Eindhoven

=== North Macedonia ===
Manager: Igor Angelovski

North Macedonia announced their final squad on 20 May 2021.

No.	Pos.	Player	Date of birth (age)	Caps	Goals	Club
1	GK	Stole Dimitrievski	25 December 1993 (aged 27)	42	0	(Royal Spanish Football Federation) Rayo Vallecano
2	DF	Egzon Bejtulai	7 January 1994 (aged 27)	21	0	(Football Federation of Macedonia) Shkëndija
3	DF	Gjoko Zajkov	10 February 1995 (aged 26)	17	1	(Royal Belgian Football Association) Charleroi
4	DF	Kire Ristevski	22 October 1990 (aged 30)	47	0	(Hungarian Football Federation) Újpest
5	MF	Arijan Ademi	29 May 1991 (aged 30)	21	4	(Croatian Football Federation) Dinamo Zagreb
6	DF	Visar Musliu	13 November 1994 (aged 26)	31	1	(Hungarian Football Federation) Fehérvár
7	FW	Ivan Trichkovski	18 April 1987 (aged 34)	64	7	(Cyprus Football Association) AEK Larnaca
8	MF	Ezgjan Alioski	12 February 1992 (aged 29)	44	8	(The Football Association) Leeds United
9	FW	Aleksandar Trajkovski	5 September 1992 (aged 28)	65	18	(Royal Spanish Football Federation) Mallorca
10	FW	Goran Pandev (captain)	27 July 1983 (aged 37)	119	37	(Italian Football Federation) Genoa
11	MF	Ferhan Hasani	18 June 1990 (aged 30)	41	2	(Albanian Football Federation) Partizani
12	GK	Risto Jankov	5 September 1998 (aged 22)	0	0	(Football Federation of Macedonia) Rabotnički
13	DF	Stefan Ristovski	12 February 1992 (aged 29)	65	2	(Croatian Football Federation) Dinamo Zagreb
14	DF	Darko Velkovski	21 June 1995 (aged 25)	27	1	(Croatian Football Federation) Rijeka
15	MF	Tihomir Kostadinov	4 March 1996 (aged 25)	10	0	(Slovak Football Association) Ružomberok
16	MF	Boban Nikolov	28 July 1994 (aged 26)	34	2	(Italian Football Federation) Lecce
17	MF	Enis Bardhi	2 July 1995 (aged 25)	34	6	(Royal Spanish Football Federation) Levante
18	FW	Vlatko Stojanovski	23 April 1997 (aged 24)	8	2	(French Football Federation) Chambly
19	FW	Krste Velkoski	20 February 1988 (aged 33)	16	0	(Football Association of Bosnia and Herzegovina) Sarajevo
20	MF	Stefan Spirovski	23 August 1990 (aged 30)	40	1	(Cyprus Football Association) AEK Larnaca
21	MF	Eljif Elmas	24 September 1999 (aged 21)	27	7	(Italian Football Federation) Napoli
22	GK	Damjan Shishkovski	18 March 1995 (aged 26)	6	0	(Cyprus Football Association) Doxa Katokopias
23	FW	Marjan Radeski	10 February 1995 (aged 26)	17	1	(Football Federation of Macedonia) Akademija Pandev
24	FW	Daniel Avramovski	20 February 1995 (aged 26)	6	0	(Turkish Football Federation) Kayserispor
25	MF	Darko Churlinov	11 July 2000 (aged 20)	3	1	(German Football Association) VfB Stuttgart
26	MF	Milan Ristovski	8 April 1998 (aged 23)	1	1	(Slovak Football Association) Spartak Trnava

=== Ukraine ===
Manager: Andriy Shevchenko

Ukraine announced a 35-man preliminary squad on 30 April 2021. The squad was extended to 36 players on 1 May, then reduced to 34 players on 15 May as Oleksandr Andriyevskyi and Volodymyr Shepelyev withdrew injured. The squad was further reduced to 33 players on 20 May as Vitaliy Buyalskyi withdrew injured, then extended to 34 players on 26 May. The squad was further reduced to 32 players on 28 May as Yevhen Konoplyanka and Viktor Kovalenko withdrew injured. The final squad was announced on 1 June.

No.	Pos.	Player	Date of birth (age)	Caps	Goals	Club
1	GK	Heorhiy Bushchan	31 May 1994 (aged 27)	6	0	(Ukrainian Association of Football) Dynamo Kyiv
2	DF	Eduard Sobol	20 April 1995 (aged 26)	20	0	(Royal Belgian Football Association) Club Brugge
3	MF	Heorhiy Sudakov	1 September 2002 (aged 18)	3	0	(Ukrainian Association of Football) Shakhtar Donetsk
4	DF	Serhiy Kryvtsov	15 March 1991 (aged 30)	23	0	(Ukrainian Association of Football) Shakhtar Donetsk
5	MF	Serhiy Sydorchuk	2 May 1991 (aged 30)	36	3	(Ukrainian Association of Football) Dynamo Kyiv
6	MF	Taras Stepanenko	8 August 1989 (aged 31)	62	3	(Ukrainian Association of Football) Shakhtar Donetsk
7	FW	Andriy Yarmolenko	23 October 1989 (aged 31)	94	40	(The Football Association) West Ham United
8	MF	Ruslan Malinovskyi	4 May 1993 (aged 28)	37	6	(Italian Football Federation) Atalanta
9	FW	Roman Yaremchuk	27 November 1995 (aged 25)	24	8	(Royal Belgian Football Association) Gent
10	MF	Mykola Shaparenko	4 October 1998 (aged 22)	12	0	(Ukrainian Association of Football) Dynamo Kyiv
11	MF	Marlos	7 June 1988 (aged 33)	25	1	(Ukrainian Association of Football) Shakhtar Donetsk
12	GK	Andriy Pyatov (captain)	28 June 1984 (aged 36)	97	0	(Ukrainian Association of Football) Shakhtar Donetsk
13	DF	Illya Zabarnyi	1 September 2002 (aged 18)	8	0	(Ukrainian Association of Football) Dynamo Kyiv
14	MF	Yevhenii Makarenko	21 May 1991 (aged 30)	12	0	(Royal Belgian Football Association) Kortrijk
15	MF	Viktor Tsyhankov	15 November 1997 (aged 23)	26	6	(Ukrainian Association of Football) Dynamo Kyiv
16	DF	Vitaliy Mykolenko	29 May 1999 (aged 22)	15	0	(Ukrainian Association of Football) Dynamo Kyiv
17	DF	Oleksandr Zinchenko	15 December 1996 (aged 24)	39	6	(The Football Association) Manchester City
18	MF	Roman Bezus	26 September 1990 (aged 30)	23	5	(Royal Belgian Football Association) Gent
19	FW	Artem Besedin	31 March 1996 (aged 25)	16	2	(Ukrainian Association of Football) Dynamo Kyiv
20	FW	Oleksandr Zubkov	3 August 1996 (aged 24)	11	1	(Hungarian Football Federation) Ferencváros
21	DF	Oleksandr Karavayev	2 June 1992 (aged 29)	33	1	(Ukrainian Association of Football) Dynamo Kyiv
22	DF	Mykola Matviyenko	2 May 1996 (aged 25)	36	0	(Ukrainian Association of Football) Shakhtar Donetsk
23	GK	Anatoliy Trubin	1 August 2001 (aged 19)	2	0	(Ukrainian Association of Football) Shakhtar Donetsk
24	DF	Oleksandr Tymchyk	20 January 1997 (aged 24)	4	0	(Ukrainian Association of Football) Dynamo Kyiv
25	DF	Denys Popov	17 February 1999 (aged 22)	1	0	(Ukrainian Association of Football) Dynamo Kyiv
26	FW	Artem Dovbyk	21 June 1997 (aged 23)	2	0	(Ukrainian Association of Football) Dnipro-1

== Group D ==
=== Croatia ===
Manager: Zlatko Dalić

Croatia announced their final squad on 17 May 2021.

No.	Pos.	Player	Date of birth (age)	Caps	Goals	Club
1	GK	Dominik Livaković	9 January 1995 (aged 26)	21	0	(Croatian Football Federation) Dinamo Zagreb
2	DF	Šime Vrsaljko	10 January 1992 (aged 29)	49	0	(Royal Spanish Football Federation) Atlético Madrid
3	DF	Borna Barišić	10 November 1992 (aged 28)	20	1	(Scottish Football Association) Rangers
4	MF	Ivan Perišić	2 February 1989 (aged 32)	101	28	(Italian Football Federation) Internazionale
5	DF	Duje Ćaleta-Car	17 September 1996 (aged 24)	14	0	(French Football Federation) Marseille
6	DF	Dejan Lovren	5 July 1989 (aged 31)	64	4	(Russian Football Union) Zenit Saint Petersburg
7	FW	Josip Brekalo	23 June 1998 (aged 22)	24	4	(German Football Association) VfL Wolfsburg
8	MF	Mateo Kovačić	6 May 1994 (aged 27)	67	3	(The Football Association) Chelsea
9	FW	Andrej Kramarić	19 June 1991 (aged 29)	54	14	(German Football Association) 1899 Hoffenheim
10	MF	Luka Modrić (captain)	9 September 1985 (aged 35)	138	17	(Royal Spanish Football Federation) Real Madrid
11	MF	Marcelo Brozović	16 November 1992 (aged 28)	59	6	(Italian Football Federation) Internazionale
12	GK	Lovre Kalinić	3 April 1990 (aged 31)	19	0	(Croatian Football Federation) Hajduk Split
13	MF	Nikola Vlašić	4 October 1997 (aged 23)	22	5	(Russian Football Union) CSKA Moscow
14	FW	Ante Budimir	22 July 1991 (aged 29)	7	1	(Royal Spanish Football Federation) Osasuna
15	MF	Mario Pašalić	9 February 1995 (aged 26)	25	3	(Italian Football Federation) Atalanta
16	DF	Mile Škorić	19 June 1991 (aged 29)	5	0	(Croatian Football Federation) Osijek
17	FW	Ante Rebić	21 September 1993 (aged 27)	38	3	(Italian Football Federation) Milan
18	MF	Mislav Oršić	29 December 1992 (aged 28)	9	0	(Croatian Football Federation) Dinamo Zagreb
19	MF	Milan Badelj	25 February 1989 (aged 32)	55	2	(Italian Football Federation) Genoa
20	FW	Bruno Petković	16 September 1994 (aged 26)	15	6	(Croatian Football Federation) Dinamo Zagreb
21	DF	Domagoj Vida	29 April 1989 (aged 32)	88	4	(Turkish Football Federation) Beşiktaş
22	DF	Josip Juranović	16 August 1995 (aged 25)	8	0	(Polish Football Association) Legia Warsaw
23	GK	Simon Sluga	17 March 1993 (aged 28)	3	0	(The Football Association) Luton Town
24	DF	Domagoj Bradarić	10 December 1999 (aged 21)	4	0	(French Football Federation) Lille
25	DF	Joško Gvardiol	23 January 2002 (aged 19)	1	0	(Croatian Football Federation) Dinamo Zagreb
26	MF	Luka Ivanušec	26 November 1998 (aged 22)	2	1	(Croatian Football Federation) Dinamo Zagreb

=== Czech Republic ===
Manager: Jaroslav Šilhavý

The Czech Republic announced 25 players of their final squad on 25 May 2021. Michal Sadílek was announced as the final player in the squad on 27 May, after the confirmation of Ondřej Kúdela's ten-match ban. Jiří Pavlenka withdrew injured and was replaced by Tomáš Koubek on 12 June.

No.	Pos.	Player	Date of birth (age)	Caps	Goals	Club
1	GK	Tomáš Vaclík	29 March 1989 (aged 32)	37	0	(Royal Spanish Football Federation) Sevilla
2	DF	Pavel Kadeřábek	25 April 1992 (aged 29)	47	3	(German Football Association) 1899 Hoffenheim
3	DF	Ondřej Čelůstka	18 June 1989 (aged 31)	26	3	(Football Association of the Czech Republic) Sparta Prague
4	DF	Jakub Brabec	6 August 1992 (aged 28)	21	1	(Football Association of the Czech Republic) Viktoria Plzeň
5	DF	Vladimír Coufal	22 August 1992 (aged 28)	16	1	(The Football Association) West Ham United
6	DF	Tomáš Kalas	15 May 1993 (aged 28)	23	2	(The Football Association) Bristol City
7	MF	Antonín Barák	3 December 1994 (aged 26)	20	6	(Italian Football Federation) Hellas Verona
8	MF	Vladimír Darida (captain)	8 August 1990 (aged 30)	72	8	(German Football Association) Hertha BSC
9	DF	Tomáš Holeš	31 March 1993 (aged 28)	8	1	(Football Association of the Czech Republic) Slavia Prague
10	FW	Patrik Schick	24 January 1996 (aged 25)	26	11	(German Football Association) Bayer Leverkusen
11	FW	Michael Krmenčík	15 March 1993 (aged 28)	29	9	(Hellenic Football Federation) PAOK
12	MF	Lukáš Masopust	12 February 1993 (aged 28)	22	2	(Football Association of the Czech Republic) Slavia Prague
13	MF	Petr Ševčík	4 May 1994 (aged 27)	7	0	(Football Association of the Czech Republic) Slavia Prague
14	MF	Jakub Jankto	19 January 1996 (aged 25)	35	4	(Italian Football Federation) Sampdoria
15	MF	Tomáš Souček	27 February 1995 (aged 26)	35	7	(The Football Association) West Ham United
16	GK	Aleš Mandous	21 April 1992 (aged 29)	1	0	(Football Association of the Czech Republic) Sigma Olomouc
17	DF	David Zima	8 November 2000 (aged 20)	2	0	(Football Association of the Czech Republic) Slavia Prague
18	DF	Jan Bořil	11 January 1991 (aged 30)	23	0	(Football Association of the Czech Republic) Slavia Prague
19	FW	Adam Hložek	25 July 2002 (aged 18)	3	0	(Football Association of the Czech Republic) Sparta Prague
20	FW	Matěj Vydra	1 May 1992 (aged 29)	36	6	(The Football Association) Burnley
21	MF	Alex Král	19 May 1998 (aged 23)	18	2	(Russian Football Union) Spartak Moscow
22	DF	Aleš Matějů	3 June 1996 (aged 25)	4	0	(Italian Football Federation) Brescia
23	GK	Tomáš Koubek	26 August 1992 (aged 28)	11	0	(German Football Association) FC Augsburg
24	FW	Tomáš Pekhart	26 May 1989 (aged 32)	22	2	(Polish Football Association) Legia Warsaw
25	MF	Jakub Pešek	24 June 1993 (aged 27)	2	1	(Football Association of the Czech Republic) Slovan Liberec
26	MF	Michal Sadílek	31 May 1999 (aged 22)	1	0	(Football Association of the Czech Republic) Slovan Liberec

=== England ===
Manager: Gareth Southgate

England announced a 33-man preliminary squad on 25 May 2021. Mason Greenwood withdrew injured on 1 June, with the final squad announced later that day. Trent Alexander-Arnold withdrew injured on 3 June and was replaced by Ben White on 7 June. After the team's first match, goalkeeper Dean Henderson withdrew injured and was replaced by Aaron Ramsdale on 15 June.

No.	Pos.	Player	Date of birth (age)	Caps	Goals	Club
1	GK	Jordan Pickford	7 March 1994 (aged 27)	31	0	(The Football Association) Everton
2	DF	Kyle Walker	28 May 1990 (aged 31)	55	0	(The Football Association) Manchester City
3	DF	Luke Shaw	12 July 1995 (aged 25)	10	0	(The Football Association) Manchester United
4	MF	Declan Rice	14 January 1999 (aged 22)	17	1	(The Football Association) West Ham United
5	DF	John Stones	28 May 1994 (aged 27)	42	2	(The Football Association) Manchester City
6	DF	Harry Maguire	5 March 1993 (aged 28)	32	3	(The Football Association) Manchester United
7	MF	Jack Grealish	10 September 1995 (aged 25)	7	0	(The Football Association) Aston Villa
8	MF	Jordan Henderson	17 June 1990 (aged 30)	59	0	(The Football Association) Liverpool
9	FW	Harry Kane (captain)	28 July 1993 (aged 27)	54	34	(The Football Association) Tottenham Hotspur
10	FW	Raheem Sterling	8 December 1994 (aged 26)	61	14	(The Football Association) Manchester City
11	FW	Marcus Rashford	31 October 1997 (aged 23)	41	12	(The Football Association) Manchester United
12	DF	Kieran Trippier	19 September 1990 (aged 30)	28	1	(Royal Spanish Football Federation) Atlético Madrid
13	GK	Dean Henderson (until 15 June)	12 March 1997 (aged 24)	1	0	(The Football Association) Manchester United
13	GK	Aaron Ramsdale (from 15 June)	14 May 1998 (aged 23)	0	0	(The Football Association) Sheffield United
14	MF	Kalvin Phillips	2 December 1995 (aged 25)	8	0	(The Football Association) Leeds United
15	DF	Tyrone Mings	13 March 1993 (aged 28)	10	0	(The Football Association) Aston Villa
16	DF	Conor Coady	25 February 1993 (aged 28)	5	1	(The Football Association) Wolverhampton Wanderers
17	MF	Jadon Sancho	25 March 2000 (aged 21)	19	3	(German Football Association) Borussia Dortmund
18	FW	Dominic Calvert-Lewin	16 March 1997 (aged 24)	9	4	(The Football Association) Everton
19	MF	Mason Mount	10 January 1999 (aged 22)	16	4	(The Football Association) Chelsea
20	MF	Phil Foden	28 May 2000 (aged 21)	6	2	(The Football Association) Manchester City
21	DF	Ben Chilwell	21 December 1996 (aged 24)	14	0	(The Football Association) Chelsea
22	DF	Ben White	8 October 1997 (aged 23)	2	0	(The Football Association) Brighton & Hove Albion
23	GK	Sam Johnstone	25 March 1993 (aged 28)	1	0	(The Football Association) West Bromwich Albion
24	DF	Reece James	8 December 1999 (aged 21)	6	0	(The Football Association) Chelsea
25	MF	Bukayo Saka	5 September 2001 (aged 19)	5	1	(The Football Association) Arsenal
26	MF	Jude Bellingham	29 June 2003 (aged 17)	4	0	(German Football Association) Borussia Dortmund

=== Scotland ===
Manager: Steve Clarke

Scotland announced their final squad on 19 May 2021.

No.	Pos.	Player	Date of birth (age)	Caps	Goals	Club
1	GK	David Marshall	5 March 1985 (aged 36)	44	0	(The Football Association) Derby County
2	DF	Stephen O'Donnell	11 May 1992 (aged 29)	19	0	(Scottish Football Association) Motherwell
3	DF	Andy Robertson (captain)	11 March 1994 (aged 27)	45	3	(The Football Association) Liverpool
4	MF	Scott McTominay	8 December 1996 (aged 24)	23	0	(The Football Association) Manchester United
5	DF	Grant Hanley	20 November 1991 (aged 29)	33	2	(The Football Association) Norwich City
6	DF	Kieran Tierney	5 June 1997 (aged 24)	21	0	(The Football Association) Arsenal
7	MF	John McGinn	18 October 1994 (aged 26)	33	10	(The Football Association) Aston Villa
8	MF	Callum McGregor	14 June 1993 (aged 27)	31	0	(Scottish Football Association) Celtic
9	FW	Lyndon Dykes	7 October 1995 (aged 25)	12	2	(The Football Association) Queens Park Rangers
10	FW	Ché Adams	13 July 1996 (aged 24)	4	2	(The Football Association) Southampton
11	MF	Ryan Christie	22 February 1995 (aged 26)	19	4	(Scottish Football Association) Celtic
12	GK	Craig Gordon	31 December 1982 (aged 38)	57	0	(Scottish Football Association) Heart of Midlothian
13	DF	Greg Taylor	5 November 1997 (aged 23)	5	0	(Scottish Football Association) Celtic
14	MF	John Fleck	24 August 1991 (aged 29)	5	0	(The Football Association) Sheffield United
15	DF	Declan Gallagher	13 February 1991 (aged 30)	9	0	(Scottish Football Association) Motherwell
16	DF	Liam Cooper	30 August 1991 (aged 29)	6	0	(The Football Association) Leeds United
17	MF	Stuart Armstrong	30 March 1992 (aged 29)	25	2	(The Football Association) Southampton
18	MF	David Turnbull	10 July 1999 (aged 21)	1	0	(Scottish Football Association) Celtic
19	FW	Kevin Nisbet	8 March 1997 (aged 24)	3	1	(Scottish Football Association) Hibernian
20	MF	Ryan Fraser	24 February 1994 (aged 27)	18	4	(The Football Association) Newcastle United
21	GK	Jon McLaughlin	9 September 1987 (aged 33)	2	0	(Scottish Football Association) Rangers
22	DF	Nathan Patterson	16 October 2001 (aged 19)	1	0	(Scottish Football Association) Rangers
23	MF	Billy Gilmour	11 June 2001 (aged 20)	2	0	(The Football Association) Chelsea
24	DF	Jack Hendry	7 May 1995 (aged 26)	6	1	(Royal Belgian Football Association) Oostende
25	MF	James Forrest	7 July 1991 (aged 29)	37	5	(Scottish Football Association) Celtic
26	DF	Scott McKenna	12 November 1996 (aged 24)	21	0	(The Football Association) Nottingham Forest

== Group E ==
=== Poland ===
Manager: (Portugal) Paulo Sousa

Poland announced their final squad on 17 May 2021. Arkadiusz Milik withdrew injured on 7 June and was not replaced, thus reducing the squad to 25 players.

No.	Pos.	Player	Date of birth (age)	Caps	Goals	Club
1	GK	Wojciech Szczęsny	18 April 1990 (aged 31)	53	0	(Italian Football Federation) Juventus
2	DF	Kamil Piątkowski	21 June 2000 (aged 20)	2	0	(Polish Football Association) Raków Częstochowa
3	MF	Paweł Dawidowicz	20 May 1995 (aged 26)	3	0	(Italian Football Federation) Hellas Verona
4	DF	Tomasz Kędziora	11 June 1994 (aged 27)	23	0	(Ukrainian Association of Football) Dynamo Kyiv
5	DF	Jan Bednarek	12 April 1996 (aged 25)	30	1	(The Football Association) Southampton
6	MF	Kacper Kozłowski	16 October 2003 (aged 17)	3	0	(Polish Football Association) Pogoń Szczecin
8	MF	Karol Linetty	2 February 1995 (aged 26)	32	2	(Italian Football Federation) Torino
9	FW	Robert Lewandowski (captain)	21 August 1988 (aged 32)	119	66	(German Football Association) Bayern Munich
10	MF	Grzegorz Krychowiak	29 January 1990 (aged 31)	80	4	(Russian Football Union) Lokomotiv Moscow
11	FW	Karol Świderski	23 January 1997 (aged 24)	4	2	(Hellenic Football Federation) PAOK
12	GK	Łukasz Skorupski	5 May 1991 (aged 30)	4	0	(Italian Football Federation) Bologna
13	DF	Maciej Rybus	19 August 1989 (aged 31)	62	2	(Russian Football Union) Lokomotiv Moscow
14	MF	Mateusz Klich	13 June 1990 (aged 30)	31	2	(The Football Association) Leeds United
15	DF	Kamil Glik	3 February 1988 (aged 33)	83	6	(Italian Football Federation) Benevento
16	MF	Jakub Moder	7 April 1999 (aged 22)	10	2	(The Football Association) Brighton & Hove Albion
17	MF	Przemysław Płacheta	23 March 1998 (aged 23)	4	0	(The Football Association) Norwich City
18	DF	Bartosz Bereszyński	12 July 1992 (aged 28)	32	0	(Italian Football Federation) Sampdoria
19	MF	Przemysław Frankowski	12 April 1995 (aged 26)	12	1	(United States Soccer Federation) Chicago Fire FC
20	MF	Piotr Zieliński	20 May 1994 (aged 27)	60	7	(Italian Football Federation) Napoli
21	MF	Kamil Jóźwiak	22 April 1998 (aged 23)	14	2	(The Football Association) Derby County
22	GK	Łukasz Fabiański	18 April 1985 (aged 36)	56	0	(The Football Association) West Ham United
23	FW	Dawid Kownacki	14 March 1997 (aged 24)	7	1	(German Football Association) Fortuna Düsseldorf
24	FW	Jakub Świerczok	28 December 1992 (aged 28)	5	1	(Polish Football Association) Piast Gliwice
25	DF	Michał Helik	9 September 1995 (aged 25)	3	0	(The Football Association) Barnsley
26	DF	Tymoteusz Puchacz	23 January 1999 (aged 22)	2	0	(Polish Football Association) Lech Poznań

=== Slovakia ===
Manager: Štefan Tarkovič

Slovakia announced a 24-man preliminary squad on 18 May 2021. The final squad was announced on 2 June.

No.	Pos.	Player	Date of birth (age)	Caps	Goals	Club
1	GK	Martin Dúbravka	15 January 1989 (aged 32)	25	0	(The Football Association) Newcastle United
2	DF	Peter Pekarík	30 October 1986 (aged 34)	101	2	(German Football Association) Hertha BSC
3	DF	Denis Vavro	10 April 1996 (aged 25)	10	0	(Royal Spanish Football Federation) Huesca
4	DF	Martin Valjent	11 December 1995 (aged 25)	9	0	(Royal Spanish Football Federation) Mallorca
5	DF	Ľubomír Šatka	2 December 1995 (aged 25)	14	0	(Polish Football Association) Lech Poznań
6	MF	Ján Greguš	29 January 1991 (aged 30)	35	4	(United States Soccer Federation) Minnesota United FC
7	MF	Vladimír Weiss	30 November 1989 (aged 31)	69	7	(Slovak Football Association) Slovan Bratislava
8	MF	Ondrej Duda	5 December 1994 (aged 26)	45	5	(German Football Association) 1. FC Köln
9	FW	Róbert Boženík	18 November 1999 (aged 21)	16	4	(Royal Dutch Football Association) Feyenoord
10	MF	Tomáš Suslov	7 June 2002 (aged 19)	3	0	(Royal Dutch Football Association) Groningen
11	MF	László Bénes	9 September 1997 (aged 23)	5	1	(German Football Association) FC Augsburg
12	GK	Dušan Kuciak	21 May 1985 (aged 36)	14	0	(Polish Football Association) Lechia Gdańsk
13	MF	Patrik Hrošovský	22 April 1992 (aged 29)	36	0	(Royal Belgian Football Association) Genk
14	DF	Milan Škriniar	11 February 1995 (aged 26)	40	2	(Italian Football Federation) Internazionale
15	DF	Tomáš Hubočan	17 September 1985 (aged 35)	70	0	(Cyprus Football Association) Omonia
16	DF	Dávid Hancko	13 December 1997 (aged 23)	14	1	(Football Association of the Czech Republic) Sparta Prague
17	MF	Marek Hamšík (captain)	27 July 1987 (aged 33)	126	26	(Swedish Football Association) IFK Göteborg
18	MF	Lukáš Haraslín	26 May 1996 (aged 25)	15	1	(Italian Football Federation) Sassuolo
19	MF	Juraj Kucka	26 February 1987 (aged 34)	83	10	(Italian Football Federation) Parma
20	FW	Róbert Mak	8 March 1991 (aged 30)	66	14	(Hungarian Football Federation) Ferencváros
21	FW	Michal Ďuriš	1 June 1988 (aged 33)	56	7	(Cyprus Football Association) Omonia
22	MF	Stanislav Lobotka	25 November 1994 (aged 26)	28	3	(Italian Football Federation) Napoli
23	GK	Marek Rodák	13 December 1996 (aged 24)	6	0	(The Football Association) Fulham
24	DF	Martin Koscelník	2 March 1995 (aged 26)	5	0	(Football Association of the Czech Republic) Slovan Liberec
25	MF	Jakub Hromada	25 May 1996 (aged 25)	2	0	(Football Association of the Czech Republic) Slavia Prague
26	FW	Ivan Schranz	13 September 1993 (aged 27)	8	1	(Football Association of the Czech Republic) Jablonec

=== Spain ===
Manager: Luis Enrique

Spain announced their final squad, containing 24 players rather than the allowed 26, on 24 May 2021. With the omission of Sergio Ramos, there were no Real Madrid players in the Spain squad for the first time in a major tournament. Sergio Busquets tested positive for SARS-CoV-2 on 6 June, and was isolated while remaining in the squad.

No.	Pos.	Player	Date of birth (age)	Caps	Goals	Club
1	GK	David de Gea	7 November 1990 (aged 30)	45	0	(The Football Association) Manchester United
2	DF	César Azpilicueta	28 August 1989 (aged 31)	25	0	(The Football Association) Chelsea
3	DF	Diego Llorente	16 August 1993 (aged 27)	8	0	(The Football Association) Leeds United
4	DF	Pau Torres	16 January 1997 (aged 24)	8	1	(Royal Spanish Football Federation) Villarreal
5	MF	Sergio Busquets (captain)	16 July 1988 (aged 32)	123	2	(Royal Spanish Football Federation) Barcelona
6	MF	Marcos Llorente	30 January 1995 (aged 26)	5	0	(Royal Spanish Football Federation) Atlético Madrid
7	FW	Álvaro Morata	23 October 1992 (aged 28)	40	19	(Italian Football Federation) Juventus
8	MF	Koke	8 January 1992 (aged 29)	50	0	(Royal Spanish Football Federation) Atlético Madrid
9	FW	Gerard Moreno	7 April 1992 (aged 29)	11	5	(Royal Spanish Football Federation) Villarreal
10	MF	Thiago	11 April 1991 (aged 30)	42	2	(The Football Association) Liverpool
11	MF	Ferran Torres	29 February 2000 (aged 21)	11	6	(The Football Association) Manchester City
12	DF	Eric García	9 January 2001 (aged 20)	8	0	(The Football Association) Manchester City
13	GK	Robert Sánchez	18 November 1997 (aged 23)	0	0	(The Football Association) Brighton & Hove Albion
14	DF	José Gayà	25 May 1995 (aged 26)	14	2	(Royal Spanish Football Federation) Valencia
16	MF	Rodri	22 June 1996 (aged 24)	20	1	(The Football Association) Manchester City
17	MF	Fabián Ruiz	3 April 1996 (aged 25)	12	1	(Italian Football Federation) Napoli
18	DF	Jordi Alba	21 March 1989 (aged 32)	72	8	(Royal Spanish Football Federation) Barcelona
19	MF	Dani Olmo	7 May 1998 (aged 23)	11	3	(German Football Association) RB Leipzig
20	MF	Adama Traoré	25 January 1996 (aged 25)	5	0	(The Football Association) Wolverhampton Wanderers
21	FW	Mikel Oyarzabal	21 April 1997 (aged 24)	13	4	(Royal Spanish Football Federation) Real Sociedad
22	MF	Pablo Sarabia	11 May 1992 (aged 29)	4	1	(French Football Federation) Paris Saint-Germain
23	GK	Unai Simón	11 June 1997 (aged 24)	7	0	(Royal Spanish Football Federation) Athletic Bilbao
24	DF	Aymeric Laporte	27 May 1994 (aged 27)	1	0	(The Football Association) Manchester City
26	FW	Pedri	25 November 2002 (aged 18)	4	0	(Royal Spanish Football Federation) Barcelona

=== Sweden ===
Manager: Janne Andersson

Sweden announced their final squad on 18 May 2021. Martin Olsson withdrew injured and was replaced by Pierre Bengtsson on 31 May. Dejan Kulusevski and Mattias Svanberg tested positive for SARS-CoV-2 on 8 June, and were isolated while remaining in the squad.

No.	Pos.	Player	Date of birth (age)	Caps	Goals	Club
1	GK	Robin Olsen	8 January 1990 (aged 31)	44	0	(The Football Association) Everton
2	DF	Mikael Lustig	13 December 1986 (aged 34)	90	6	(Swedish Football Association) AIK
3	DF	Victor Lindelöf	17 July 1994 (aged 26)	41	3	(The Football Association) Manchester United
4	DF	Andreas Granqvist	16 April 1985 (aged 36)	88	9	(Swedish Football Association) Helsingborgs IF
5	DF	Pierre Bengtsson	12 April 1988 (aged 33)	38	0	(Danish Football Association) Vejle
6	DF	Ludwig Augustinsson	21 April 1994 (aged 27)	32	2	(German Football Association) Werder Bremen
7	MF	Sebastian Larsson (captain)	6 June 1985 (aged 36)	129	10	(Swedish Football Association) AIK
8	MF	Albin Ekdal	28 July 1989 (aged 31)	57	0	(Italian Football Federation) Sampdoria
9	FW	Marcus Berg	17 August 1986 (aged 34)	86	24	(Russian Football Union) Krasnodar
10	MF	Emil Forsberg	23 October 1991 (aged 29)	58	9	(German Football Association) RB Leipzig
11	FW	Alexander Isak	21 September 1999 (aged 21)	22	6	(Royal Spanish Football Federation) Real Sociedad
12	GK	Karl-Johan Johnsson	28 January 1990 (aged 31)	9	0	(Danish Football Association) Copenhagen
13	MF	Gustav Svensson	7 February 1987 (aged 34)	31	0	(Chinese Football Association) Guangzhou City
14	DF	Filip Helander	22 April 1993 (aged 28)	15	0	(Scottish Football Association) Rangers
15	MF	Ken Sema	30 September 1993 (aged 27)	12	0	(The Football Association) Watford
16	DF	Emil Krafth	2 August 1994 (aged 26)	28	0	(The Football Association) Newcastle United
17	MF	Viktor Claesson	2 January 1992 (aged 29)	46	9	(Russian Football Union) Krasnodar
18	DF	Pontus Jansson	13 February 1991 (aged 30)	27	0	(The Football Association) Brentford
19	MF	Mattias Svanberg	5 January 1999 (aged 22)	9	1	(Italian Football Federation) Bologna
20	MF	Kristoffer Olsson	30 June 1995 (aged 25)	25	0	(Russian Football Union) Krasnodar
21	MF	Dejan Kulusevski	25 April 2000 (aged 21)	13	1	(Italian Football Federation) Juventus
22	MF	Robin Quaison	9 October 1993 (aged 27)	26	9	(German Football Association) Mainz 05
23	GK	Kristoffer Nordfeldt	23 June 1989 (aged 31)	14	0	(Turkish Football Federation) Gençlerbirliği
24	DF	Marcus Danielson	8 April 1989 (aged 32)	9	3	(Chinese Football Association) Dalian Professional
25	FW	Jordan Larsson	20 June 1997 (aged 23)	6	1	(Russian Football Union) Spartak Moscow
26	MF	Jens Cajuste	10 August 1999 (aged 21)	4	0	(Danish Football Association) Midtjylland

== Group F ==
=== France ===
Manager: Didier Deschamps

France announced their final squad on 18 May 2021.

No.	Pos.	Player	Date of birth (age)	Caps	Goals	Club
1	GK	Hugo Lloris (captain)	26 December 1986 (aged 34)	125	0	(The Football Association) Tottenham Hotspur
2	DF	Benjamin Pavard	28 March 1996 (aged 25)	35	2	(German Football Association) Bayern Munich
3	DF	Presnel Kimpembe	13 August 1995 (aged 25)	17	0	(French Football Federation) Paris Saint-Germain
4	DF	Raphaël Varane	25 April 1993 (aged 28)	75	5	(Royal Spanish Football Federation) Real Madrid
5	DF	Clément Lenglet	17 June 1995 (aged 25)	12	1	(Royal Spanish Football Federation) Barcelona
6	MF	Paul Pogba	15 March 1993 (aged 28)	80	10	(The Football Association) Manchester United
7	FW	Antoine Griezmann	21 March 1991 (aged 30)	91	37	(Royal Spanish Football Federation) Barcelona
8	MF	Thomas Lemar	12 November 1995 (aged 25)	25	4	(Royal Spanish Football Federation) Atlético Madrid
9	FW	Olivier Giroud	30 September 1986 (aged 34)	108	46	(The Football Association) Chelsea
10	FW	Kylian Mbappé	20 December 1998 (aged 22)	44	17	(French Football Federation) Paris Saint-Germain
11	FW	Ousmane Dembélé	15 May 1997 (aged 24)	25	4	(Royal Spanish Football Federation) Barcelona
12	MF	Corentin Tolisso	3 August 1994 (aged 26)	25	2	(German Football Association) Bayern Munich
13	MF	N'Golo Kanté	29 March 1991 (aged 30)	46	2	(The Football Association) Chelsea
14	MF	Adrien Rabiot	3 April 1995 (aged 26)	15	0	(Italian Football Federation) Juventus
15	DF	Kurt Zouma	27 October 1994 (aged 26)	8	1	(The Football Association) Chelsea
16	GK	Steve Mandanda	28 March 1985 (aged 36)	34	0	(French Football Federation) Marseille
17	MF	Moussa Sissoko	16 August 1989 (aged 31)	69	2	(The Football Association) Tottenham Hotspur
18	DF	Lucas Digne	20 July 1993 (aged 27)	38	0	(The Football Association) Everton
19	FW	Karim Benzema	19 December 1987 (aged 33)	83	27	(Royal Spanish Football Federation) Real Madrid
20	MF	Kingsley Coman	13 June 1996 (aged 24)	30	5	(German Football Association) Bayern Munich
21	DF	Lucas Hernandez	14 February 1996 (aged 25)	26	0	(German Football Association) Bayern Munich
22	FW	Wissam Ben Yedder	12 August 1990 (aged 30)	14	2	(French Football Federation) Monaco
23	GK	Mike Maignan	3 July 1995 (aged 25)	1	0	(French Football Federation) Lille
24	DF	Léo Dubois	14 September 1994 (aged 26)	7	0	(French Football Federation) Lyon
25	DF	Jules Koundé	12 November 1998 (aged 22)	1	0	(Royal Spanish Football Federation) Sevilla
26	FW	Marcus Thuram	6 August 1997 (aged 23)	3	0	(German Football Association) Borussia Mönchengladbach

=== Germany ===
Manager: Joachim Löw

Germany announced their final squad on 19 May 2021.

No.	Pos.	Player	Date of birth (age)	Caps	Goals	Club
1	GK	Manuel Neuer (captain)	27 March 1986 (aged 35)	100	0	(German Football Association) Bayern Munich
2	DF	Antonio Rüdiger	3 March 1993 (aged 28)	41	1	(The Football Association) Chelsea
3	DF	Marcel Halstenberg	27 September 1991 (aged 29)	8	1	(German Football Association) RB Leipzig
4	DF	Matthias Ginter	19 January 1994 (aged 27)	40	2	(German Football Association) Borussia Mönchengladbach
5	DF	Mats Hummels	16 December 1988 (aged 32)	72	5	(German Football Association) Borussia Dortmund
6	MF	Joshua Kimmich	8 February 1995 (aged 26)	55	3	(German Football Association) Bayern Munich
7	FW	Kai Havertz	11 June 1999 (aged 22)	14	3	(The Football Association) Chelsea
8	MF	Toni Kroos	4 January 1990 (aged 31)	102	17	(Royal Spanish Football Federation) Real Madrid
9	FW	Kevin Volland	30 July 1992 (aged 28)	11	1	(French Football Federation) Monaco
10	MF	Serge Gnabry	14 July 1995 (aged 25)	22	16	(German Football Association) Bayern Munich
11	FW	Timo Werner	6 March 1996 (aged 25)	39	16	(The Football Association) Chelsea
12	GK	Bernd Leno	4 March 1992 (aged 29)	8	0	(The Football Association) Arsenal
13	MF	Jonas Hofmann	14 July 1992 (aged 28)	3	0	(German Football Association) Borussia Mönchengladbach
14	MF	Jamal Musiala	26 February 2003 (aged 18)	3	0	(German Football Association) Bayern Munich
15	DF	Niklas Süle	3 September 1995 (aged 25)	31	1	(German Football Association) Bayern Munich
16	DF	Lukas Klostermann	3 June 1996 (aged 25)	13	0	(German Football Association) RB Leipzig
17	MF	Florian Neuhaus	16 March 1997 (aged 24)	6	2	(German Football Association) Borussia Mönchengladbach
18	MF	Leon Goretzka	6 February 1995 (aged 26)	32	13	(German Football Association) Bayern Munich
19	MF	Leroy Sané	11 January 1996 (aged 25)	30	7	(German Football Association) Bayern Munich
20	DF	Robin Gosens	5 July 1994 (aged 26)	7	1	(Italian Football Federation) Atalanta
21	MF	İlkay Gündoğan	24 October 1990 (aged 30)	46	11	(The Football Association) Manchester City
22	GK	Kevin Trapp	8 July 1990 (aged 30)	5	0	(German Football Association) Eintracht Frankfurt
23	DF	Emre Can	12 January 1994 (aged 27)	34	1	(German Football Association) Borussia Dortmund
24	DF	Robin Koch	17 July 1996 (aged 24)	8	0	(The Football Association) Leeds United
25	FW	Thomas Müller	13 September 1989 (aged 31)	102	39	(German Football Association) Bayern Munich
26	DF	Christian Günter	28 February 1993 (aged 28)	3	0	(German Football Association) SC Freiburg

=== Hungary ===
Manager: (Italy) Marco Rossi

Hungary announced a 30-man preliminary squad on 6 May 2021. The squad was reduced to 29 players on 23 May as Szilveszter Hangya withdrew injured. Dominik Szoboszlai withdrew injured on 1 June, with the final squad announced later that day. Dániel Gazdag left the squad on 16 June due to injury.

No.	Pos.	Player	Date of birth (age)	Caps	Goals	Club
1	GK	Péter Gulácsi	6 May 1990 (aged 31)	39	0	(German Football Association) RB Leipzig
2	DF	Ádám Lang	17 January 1993 (aged 28)	39	1	(Cyprus Football Association) Omonia
3	DF	Ákos Kecskés	4 January 1996 (aged 25)	2	0	(Swiss Football Association) Lugano
4	DF	Attila Szalai	20 January 1998 (aged 23)	13	0	(Turkish Football Federation) Fenerbahçe
5	DF	Attila Fiola	17 February 1990 (aged 31)	35	1	(Hungarian Football Federation) Fehérvár
6	DF	Willi Orbán	3 November 1992 (aged 28)	22	5	(German Football Association) RB Leipzig
7	DF	Loïc Négo	15 January 1991 (aged 30)	11	2	(Hungarian Football Federation) Fehérvár
8	MF	Ádám Nagy	17 June 1995 (aged 25)	48	1	(The Football Association) Bristol City
9	FW	Ádám Szalai (captain)	9 December 1987 (aged 33)	71	23	(German Football Association) Mainz 05
10	MF	Tamás Cseri	15 January 1988 (aged 33)	3	0	(Hungarian Football Federation) Mezőkövesd
11	FW	Filip Holender	27 July 1994 (aged 26)	15	1	(Football Association of Serbia) Partizan
12	GK	Dénes Dibusz	16 November 1990 (aged 30)	15	0	(Hungarian Football Federation) Ferencváros
13	MF	András Schäfer	13 April 1999 (aged 22)	6	1	(Slovak Football Association) Dunajská Streda
14	DF	Gergő Lovrencsics	1 September 1988 (aged 32)	41	1	(Hungarian Football Federation) Ferencváros
15	MF	László Kleinheisler	8 April 1994 (aged 27)	34	3	(Croatian Football Federation) Osijek
16	MF	Dániel Gazdag	2 March 1996 (aged 25)	6	1	(United States Soccer Federation) Philadelphia Union
17	MF	Roland Varga	23 January 1990 (aged 31)	22	3	(Hungarian Football Federation) MTK Budapest
18	MF	Dávid Sigér	30 November 1990 (aged 30)	13	1	(Hungarian Football Federation) Ferencváros
19	MF	Kevin Varga	30 March 1996 (aged 25)	8	1	(Turkish Football Federation) Kasımpaşa
20	FW	Roland Sallai	22 May 1997 (aged 24)	22	4	(German Football Association) SC Freiburg
21	DF	Endre Botka	25 August 1994 (aged 26)	10	0	(Hungarian Football Federation) Ferencváros
22	GK	Ádám Bogdán	27 September 1987 (aged 33)	21	0	(Hungarian Football Federation) Ferencváros
23	FW	Nemanja Nikolić	31 December 1987 (aged 33)	38	8	(Hungarian Football Federation) Fehérvár
24	FW	Szabolcs Schön	27 September 2000 (aged 20)	1	0	(United States Soccer Federation) FC Dallas
25	FW	János Hahn	15 March 1995 (aged 26)	2	0	(Hungarian Football Federation) Paks
26	DF	Bendegúz Bolla	22 November 1999 (aged 21)	2	0	(Hungarian Football Federation) Fehérvár

=== Portugal ===
Manager: Fernando Santos

Portugal announced their final squad on 20 May 2021. João Cancelo withdrew after testing positive for SARS-CoV-2 and was replaced by Diogo Dalot on 13 June.

No.	Pos.	Player	Date of birth (age)	Caps	Goals	Club
1	GK	Rui Patrício	15 February 1988 (aged 33)	93	0	(The Football Association) Wolverhampton Wanderers
2	DF	Nélson Semedo	16 November 1993 (aged 27)	18	0	(The Football Association) Wolverhampton Wanderers
3	DF	Pepe	26 February 1983 (aged 38)	115	7	(Portuguese Football Federation) Porto
4	DF	Rúben Dias	14 May 1997 (aged 24)	28	2	(The Football Association) Manchester City
5	DF	Raphaël Guerreiro	22 December 1993 (aged 27)	46	2	(German Football Association) Borussia Dortmund
6	DF	José Fonte	22 December 1983 (aged 37)	46	0	(French Football Federation) Lille
7	FW	Cristiano Ronaldo (captain)	5 February 1985 (aged 36)	175	104	(Italian Football Federation) Juventus
8	MF	João Moutinho	8 September 1986 (aged 34)	131	7	(The Football Association) Wolverhampton Wanderers
9	FW	André Silva	6 November 1995 (aged 25)	39	16	(German Football Association) Eintracht Frankfurt
10	MF	Bernardo Silva	10 August 1994 (aged 26)	55	7	(The Football Association) Manchester City
11	MF	Bruno Fernandes	8 September 1994 (aged 26)	29	4	(The Football Association) Manchester United
12	GK	Anthony Lopes	1 October 1990 (aged 30)	13	0	(French Football Federation) Lyon
13	MF	Danilo Pereira	9 September 1991 (aged 29)	47	2	(French Football Federation) Paris Saint-Germain
14	MF	William Carvalho	7 April 1992 (aged 29)	66	4	(Royal Spanish Football Federation) Real Betis
15	FW	Rafa Silva	17 May 1993 (aged 28)	21	0	(Portuguese Football Federation) Benfica
16	MF	Renato Sanches	18 August 1997 (aged 23)	26	2	(French Football Federation) Lille
17	MF	Gonçalo Guedes	29 November 1996 (aged 24)	23	6	(Royal Spanish Football Federation) Valencia
18	MF	Rúben Neves	13 March 1997 (aged 24)	21	0	(The Football Association) Wolverhampton Wanderers
19	MF	Pedro Gonçalves	28 June 1998 (aged 22)	2	0	(Portuguese Football Federation) Sporting CP
20	DF	Diogo Dalot	18 March 1999 (aged 22)	0	0	(Italian Football Federation) Milan
21	FW	Diogo Jota	4 December 1996 (aged 24)	14	6	(The Football Association) Liverpool
22	GK	Rui Silva	7 February 1994 (aged 27)	1	0	(Royal Spanish Football Federation) Granada
23	FW	João Félix	10 November 1999 (aged 21)	17	3	(Royal Spanish Football Federation) Atlético Madrid
24	MF	Sérgio Oliveira	2 June 1992 (aged 29)	11	0	(Portuguese Football Federation) Porto
25	DF	Nuno Mendes	19 June 2002 (aged 18)	5	0	(Portuguese Football Federation) Sporting CP
26	MF	João Palhinha	9 July 1995 (aged 25)	4	1	(Portuguese Football Federation) Sporting CP

== Player representation ==
=== By age ===
==== Outfield players ====
- Oldest: (Portugal) Pepe (38 years, 105 days)
- Youngest: (Poland) Kacper Kozłowski (17 years, 238 days)

==== Goalkeepers ====
- Oldest: (Netherlands) Maarten Stekelenburg (38 years, 262 days)
- Youngest: (Ukraine) Anatoliy Trubin (19 years, 314 days)

==== Captains ====
- Oldest: (North Macedonia) Goran Pandev (37 years, 319 days)
- Youngest: (Scotland) Andrew Robertson (27 years, 92 days)

==== Coaches ====
- Oldest: (Turkey) Şenol Güneş (69 years, 10 days)
- Youngest: (Ukraine) Andriy Shevchenko (44 years, 255 days)

=== By club ===
Players	Clubs
15	(England) Chelsea
14	(England) Manchester City (Germany) Bayern Munich
12	(Italy) Juventus
11	(Ukraine) Dynamo Kyiv
10	(England) Manchester United (Germany) Borussia Dortmund (Germany) Borussia Mönchengladbach
9	(Germany) RB Leipzig (Italy) Atalanta
8	(Croatia) Dinamo Zagreb (England) Liverpool (England) Tottenham Hotspur (Italy) Internazionale (Italy) Napoli (Spain) Barcelona
7	(England) Leeds United (England) Leicester City (England) Wolverhampton Wanderers (France) Lille (Hungary) Ferencváros (Spain) Atlético Madrid (Ukraine) Shakhtar Donetsk
6	(Czech Republic) Slavia Prague (France) Paris Saint-Germain (Germany) 1899 Hoffenheim (Germany) Eintracht Frankfurt (Germany) VfL Wolfsburg (Italy) Sassuolo (Russia) Spartak Moscow (Russia) Zenit Saint Petersburg (Spain) Real Madrid
5	(England) Brighton & Hove Albion (England) West Ham United (Germany) FC Augsburg (Hungary) Fehérvár (Italy) Milan (Netherlands) Ajax (Russia) Krasnodar (Russia) Lokomotiv Moscow (Scotland) Celtic (Scotland) Rangers
4	(Denmark) Copenhagen (England) Arsenal (England) Brentford (England) Crystal Palace (England) Everton (England) Newcastle United (England) Norwich City (England) Southampton (France) Lyon (Germany) Bayer Leverkusen (Germany) Mainz 05 (Italy) Sampdoria (Italy) Torino (Netherlands) PSV Eindhoven (Spain) Valencia (Turkey) Fenerbahçe (Wales) Cardiff City
3	(Belgium) Club Brugge (Cyprus) Omonia (Czech Republic) Slovan Liberec (Czech Republic) Sparta Prague (England) Aston Villa (England) Luton Town (England) Sheffield United (England) Stoke City (France) Monaco (Germany) Hertha BSC (Germany) SC Freiburg (Germany) VfB Stuttgart (Italy) Bologna (Netherlands) AZ (Netherlands) Feyenoord (Portugal) Benfica (Portugal) Sporting CP (Russia) CSKA Moscow (Russia) Dynamo Moscow (Spain) Sevilla (Turkey) Beşiktaş (Turkey) Galatasaray (United States) Minnesota United FC
2	(Belgium) Genk (Belgium) Gent (Croatia) Osijek (Cyprus) AEK Larnaca (Cyprus) Pafos (Denmark) Esbjerg (Denmark) Midtjylland (England) Bournemouth (England) Bristol City (England) Derby County (England) Fulham (England) Queens Park Rangers (England) Watford (England) West Bromwich Albion (France) Marseille (France) Nice (Germany) Fortuna Düsseldorf (Germany) Schalke 04 (Germany) Union Berlin (Germany) Werder Bremen (Greece) PAOK (Hungary) MTK Budapest (Italy) Brescia (Italy) Genoa (Italy) Hellas Verona (Italy) Lazio (Italy) Parma (Italy) Roma (Poland) Lech Poznań (Poland) Legia Warsaw (Portugal) Porto (Russia) Rubin Kazan (Scotland) Motherwell (Spain) Mallorca (Spain) Real Sociedad (Spain) Villarreal (Sweden) AIK (Switzerland) Basel (Turkey) İstanbul Başakşehir (Turkey) Trabzonspor (Wales) Swansea City
1	(Albania) Partizani (Austria) LASK (Austria) Red Bull Salzburg (Belgium) Charleroi (Belgium) Kortrijk (Belgium) Oostende (Bosnia and Herzegovina) Sarajevo (Canada) CF Montréal (China) Dalian Professional (China) Guangzhou City (China) Shanghai Port (Croatia) Hajduk Split (Croatia) Istra 1961 (Croatia) Rijeka (Cyprus) Doxa Katokopias (Czech Republic) Jablonec (Czech Republic) Sigma Olomouc (Czech Republic) Viktoria Plzeň (Denmark) Vejle (England) Barnsley (England) Blackburn Rovers (England) Bristol Rovers (England) Burnley (England) Charlton Athletic (England) Doncaster Rovers (England) Nottingham Forest (Finland) HJK (France) Bordeaux (France) Chambly (France) Le Havre (France) Montpellier (France) Rennes (France) Strasbourg (Germany) 1. FC Köln (Greece) AEL (Hungary) Mezőkövesd (Hungary) Paks (Hungary) Újpest (Italy) Benevento (Italy) Fiorentina (Italy) Lecce (Italy) Udinese (Japan) Vissel Kobe (Netherlands) Groningen (Netherlands) PEC Zwolle (North Macedonia) Akademija Pandev (North Macedonia) Rabotnički (North Macedonia) Shkëndija (Norway) Brann (Poland) Lechia Gdańsk (Poland) Piast Gliwice (Poland) Pogoń Szczecin (Poland) Raków Częstochowa (Poland) Warta Poznań (Russia) Akhmat Grozny (Russia) Sochi (Scotland) Heart of Midlothian (Scotland) Hibernian (Serbia) Partizan (Slovakia) Dunajská Streda (Slovakia) Ružomberok (Slovakia) Slovan Bratislava (Slovakia) Spartak Trnava (Spain) Athletic Bilbao (Spain) Getafe (Spain) Granada (Spain) Huesca (Spain) Levante (Spain) Osasuna (Spain) Rayo Vallecano (Spain) Real Betis (Sweden) BK Häcken (Sweden) Djurgårdens IF (Sweden) Helsingborgs IF (Sweden) IF Elfsborg (Sweden) IFK Göteborg (Sweden) Malmö FF (Switzerland) Lugano (Switzerland) Luzern (Switzerland) Young Boys (Switzerland) Zürich (Turkey) Antalyaspor (Turkey) Gençlerbirliği (Turkey) Kasımpaşa (Turkey) Kayserispor (Ukraine) Dnipro-1 (United States) Chicago Fire FC (United States) FC Dallas (United States) Philadelphia Union

=== By club nationality ===
Key
Bold	Nation represented at the tournament
Italic	Nation not a UEFA member

Players	Clubs
147	**England**
92	**Germany**
75	**Italy**
42	**Spain**
32	**Russia**
30	**France**
19	**Ukraine**
18	**Turkey**
17	**Hungary**; **Netherlands**
15	**Czech Republic**
14	**Scotland**
13	**Croatia**
10	**Belgium**
9	**Denmark**; **Poland**
8	Cyprus; **Portugal**; **Sweden**
6	**Switzerland**; United States; **Wales**
4	**Slovakia**
3	China; Greece; **North Macedonia**
2	**Austria**
1	Albania; Bosnia and Herzegovina; Canada; **Finland**; Japan; Norway; Serbia

The above table is the same when it comes to league representation, with only the following exceptions:

- The English league system had 153 representatives, including six players from Wales-based Cardiff City and Swansea City.
- The American league system had 7 representatives, including one player from Canada-based CF Montréal.

No national team had all its players from the nation's club teams. Every national team also had at least one player from a club of its nation, though Wales had no players from its league system.
