= Jan Šulc =

Jan Šulc may refer to:

- Jan Šulc (canoeist)
- Jan Šulc (ice hockey)
- Jan Šulc (footballer)
