= Imad Rondić =

Bosnia and Herzegovina footballer (born 1999)

Personal information
- Date of birth: 16 February 1999 (age 27)
- Place of birth: Sarajevo, Bosnia and Herzegovina
- Height: 1.90 m (6 ft 3 in)
- Position: Forward

Team information
- Current team: 1. FC Köln
- Number: 15

Youth career
- –2014: Željezničar Sarajevo
- 2014–2016: Olimpik
- 2016–2017: Mladost Doboj Kakanj
- 2017: Sarajevo

Senior career*
Years	Team	Apps	(Gls)
2016–2017	Mladost Doboj Kakanj	3	(0)
2018–2019	Slavia Prague B	14	(8)
2018	→ Viktoria Žižkov (loan)	11	(2)
2020–2023	Slovan Liberec	103	(14)
2023–2025	Widzew Łódź	50	(14)
2025–	1. FC Köln	10	(1)
2025–2026	→ Raków Częstochowa (loan)	12	(0)
2026	→ Preußen Münster (loan)	14	(2)

International career
2017–2018	Bosnia and Herzegovina U19	6	(1)
- * Club domestic league appearances and goals as of 17:30, 11 October 2026 (UTC)

Imad Rondić (born 16 February 1999) is a Bosnian professional footballer who plays as a forward for German Bundesliga club 1. FC Köln.

== Career ==
As a youth player, Rondić joined the youth academy of Željezničar Sarajevo, before moving to Olimpik in 2014. Two years later, he joined the youth setup of Mladost Doboj Kakanj, where he started his senior career. In 2018, he signed for Czech club Slavia Prague, but he only played for their reserve team Slavia Prague B.

The same year, Rondić was sent on loan to Viktoria Žižkov. Ahead of the second half of the 2023–24 season, he signed for Slovan Liberec. Upon arriving at the club, he scored five goals in his first five appearances, all friendlies. During the summer of 2023, he left the Czech Republic and signed for Polish side Widzew Łódź. In his first season with the club, he scored five goals and recorded three assists.

On 3 February 2025, Rondić signed a four-and-a-half-year contract with 1. FC Köln in German 2. Bundesliga.

On 2 September 2025, Rondić returned to Poland and joined Ekstraklasa club Raków Częstochowa on a season-long loan. On 27 January 2026, he moved on a new loan to Preußen Münster in 2. Bundesliga.

== Style of play ==
Rondić can play as a forward or winger and is left-footed. He is known for his speed and versatility.

== Career statistics ==
As of match played 11 October 2026

Appearances and goals by club, season and competition
Club	Season	League			National cup (Note: Includes Bosnia and Herzegovina Cup, Czech Cup, Polish Cup, DFB-Pokal)		Continental		Total	
Club	Season	Division	Apps	Goals	Apps	Goals	Apps	Goals	Apps	Goals
Mladost Doboj Kakanj	2016–17	Bosnian Premier League	3	0	4	0	—		7	0
Viktoria Žižkov (loan)	2018–19	Czech National Football League	11	2	3	3	—		14	5
Slavia Prague B	2019–20	Bohemian Football League	14	8	—		—		14	8
Slovan Liberec	2019–20	Czech First League	15	0	2	0	—		17	0
Slovan Liberec	2020–21	Czech First League	30	6	3	1	2 (Note: Appearances in UEFA Europa League)	0	35	7
Slovan Liberec	2021–22	Czech First League	30	4	1	0	—		31	4
Slovan Liberec	2022–23	Czech First League	28	4	4	3	—		32	7
Slovan Liberec	Total		103	14	10	4	2	0	115	18
Widzew Łódź	2023–24	Ekstraklasa	32	5	3	2	—		35	7
Widzew Łódź	2024–25	Ekstraklasa	18	9	2	0	—		20	9
Widzew Łódź	Total		50	14	5	2	—		55	16
1. FC Köln	2024–25	2. Bundesliga	9	1	1	0	—		10	1
1. FC Köln	2026–27	Bundesliga	2	0	0	0	—		2	0
1. FC Köln	Total		11	1	1	0	—		12	1
Raków Częstochowa (loan)	2025–26	Ekstraklasa	12	0	2	0	4 (Note: Appearances in UEFA Conference League)	0	18	0
Preußen Münster (loan)	2025–26	2. Bundesliga	14	2	—		—		14	2
Career total			218	41	25	9	6	0	249	50

== Honours ==
1. FC Köln

- 2. Bundesliga: 2024–25
