= Jakub Hromada =

Slovak footballer (born 1996)

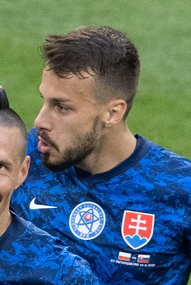
- Hromada with Slovakia at UEFA Euro 2020

Personal information
- Date of birth: 25 May 1996 (age 30)
- Place of birth: Košice, Slovakia
- Height: 1.80 m (5 ft 11 in)
- Position: Midfielder

Team information
- Current team: Iraklis
- Number: 14

Youth career
- –2013: KAC Jednota Košice
- 2011–2012: → Zemplín Michalovce (loan)
- 2012–2013: → Juventus (loan)
- 2013–2015: Juventus
- 2014: → Genoa (loan)
- 2015: Sampdoria
- 2015: → Pro Vercelli (loan)

Senior career*
Years	Team	Apps	(Gls)
2015–2017	Sampdoria	0	(0)
2015–2016	→ Senica (loan)	25	(5)
2016–2017	→ Viktoria Plzeň (loan)	18	(1)
2017–2024	Slavia Prague	77	(2)
2020	→ Slovan Liberec (loan)	22	(2)
2024	→ Rapid București (loan)	8	(1)
2024–2026	Rapid București	44	(1)
2026–	Iraklis	0	(0)

International career^{‡}
2011	Slovakia U15	2	(0)
2011	Slovakia U16	1	(0)
2012–2013	Slovakia U17	7	(1)
2014	Slovakia U18	3	(0)
2014–2015	Slovakia U19	6	(2)
2016–2017	Slovakia U21	10	(1)
2021	Slovakia	5	(0)
- * Club domestic league appearances and goals as of 20 July 2026 ‡ National team caps and goals as of 14 November 2021

Jakub Hromada (born 25 May 1996) is a Slovak professional footballer who plays as a midfielder for Super League Greece club Iraklis.

== Club career ==
=== Senica ===
On 12 August 2015, Senica signed two-year loan with Hromada from Sampdoria. He made his professional Fortuna liga debut for Senica against Slovan Bratislava on 15 August 2015.

==== Loan to Viktoria Plzeň ====
On 23 June 2016, Hromada signed one-year loan with option to buy from Sampdoria.

=== Slavia Prague ===
On 20 June 2017, Hromada signed for Slavia Prague, although the transfer rumours were on for most of June. At the time of the signing Hromada was expected to be at 2017 UEFA European Under-21 Championship in Poland, but had to withdraw a couple of days before its commencement, due to a knee injury. On 9 May 2018, he played as Slavia Prague won the 2017-18 Czech Cup final against Jablonec.

==== Loan to Rapid București ====
On 4 February 2024, Slavia loaned Hromada to Romanian Liga I club Rapid București until end of the season with option to make transfer permanent. He made his professional debut on 24 February 2024, in a 3–1 away loss to Politehnica Iaşi. Three weeks later, he scored his first goal in a 1–1 draw against Universitatea Craiova.

=== Rapid Bucureşti ===
On 17 June 2024, Jakub Hromada joined on a three-year contract after the club decided to pay €500,000 to Slavia Prague and sign him for a permanent deal.

== International career ==
In March 2021, Hromada was first called up to Slovak senior national team by Štefan Tarkovič for three 2022 FIFA World Cup qualification fixtures against Cyprus, Malta and Russia.

After being benched for two ties against Cyprus (away, 0–0) and Malta (home, 2–2), Tarkovič granted Hromada his international debut on 30 March 2021 in a crucial qualifier against Russia, which could have seen Slovakia's chances of qualification diminish after first set of fixtures. Hromada debuted in the starting-XI and saw Slovakia take a lead in the first half through a header by Milan Škriniar. He was booked with a yellow card in first-half injury time, following a foul on Rifat Zhemaletdinov. Hromada was replaced after 60 minutes of play by Patrik Hrošovský. In his absence, Russia equalised through Fernandes, but Róbert Mak sealed Slovak 2–1 victory soon after. After his debut, Hromada was praised for exhibition of "modern football", defensive anticipation, rebound collection, ball exportation and speed.

He was subsequently selected for Slovakia's squad at UEFA Euro 2020, where he made two appearances in the group stage, featuring against Poland and Spain. Slovakia were eliminated in the group stage after recording one win and two defeats.

== Career statistics ==
=== Club ===
As of match played 17 August 2026

Appearances and goals by club, season and competition
Club	Season	League			National cup (Note: Includes Slovak Cup, Czech Cup, Cupa României, Greek Cup)		Europe		Other		Total	
Club	Season	Division	Apps	Goals	Apps	Goals	Apps	Goals	Apps	Goals	Apps	Goals
Senica (loan)	2015–16	Slovak Super Liga	25	5	3	1	—		—		28	6
Viktoria Plzeň (loan)	2016–17	Czech First League	18	1	0	0	6 (Note: Two appearances in UEFA Champions League, four appearances in UEFA Europa League)	0	—		24	1
Slavia Prague	2017–18	Czech First League	14	0	4	0	4 (Note: Appearances in UEFA Europa League)	0	—		22	0
Slavia Prague	2018–19	Czech First League	1	0	—		—		—		1	0
Slavia Prague	2019–20	Czech First League	0	0	1	0	—		1 (Note: Appearance in Czech-Slovak Supercup)	0	2	0
Slavia Prague	2020–21	Czech First League	14	0	3	1	5	0	—		22	1
Slavia Prague	2021–22	Czech First League	22	1	1	0	3 (Note: One appearance in UEFA Champions League, two appearances in UEFA Europa League)	0	—		26	1
Slavia Prague	2022–23	Czech First League	19	1	3	0	0	0	—		22	1
Slavia Prague	2023–24	Czech First League	7	0	1	0	3	0	—		11	0
Slavia Prague	Total		77	2	13	1	15	0	1	0	106	3
Slovan Liberec (loan)	2019–20	Czech First League	13	0	3	0	—		—		16	0
Slovan Liberec (loan)	2020–21	Czech First League	9	2	0	0	8	1	—		17	3
Slovan Liberec (loan)	Total		22	2	3	0	8	1	—		33	3
Rapid București (loan)	2023–24	Liga I	8	1	—		—		—		8	1
Rapid București	2024–25	Liga I	18	0	0	0	—		—		18	0
Rapid București	2025–26	Liga I	25	1	2	0	—		—		27	1
Rapid București	2026–27	Liga I	1	0	—		—		—		1	0
Rapid București	Total		52	2	2	0	—		—		54	2
Iraklis	2026–27	Super League Greece	0	0	1	0	—		—		1	0
Career total			194	12	22	2	29	1	1	0	246	15

=== International ===
As of match played 14 November 2021

Appearances and goals by national team and year
National team	Year	Apps	Goals
Slovakia	2021	5	0
Total		5	0

== Honours ==
Slavia Prague

- Czech First League: 2018–19, 2020–21
- Czech Cup: 2017–18, 2018–19, 2020–21, 2022–23
