= Kamso Mara =

Guinean footballer

Personal information
- Full name: Youssouf Kamso Mara
- Date of birth: 24 December 1994 (age 31)
- Place of birth: Conakry, Guinea
- Height: 1.86 m (6 ft 1 in)
- Position: Midfielder

Senior career*
Years	Team	Apps	(Gls)
2016–2017	Hyères	29	(2)
2017–2018	Vlašim	6	(0)
2018	→ Vysočina Jihlava (loan)	9	(0)
2018–2022	Slovan Liberec	88	(10)
2021–2022	→ Beitar Jerusalem (loan)	16	(0)
2023–2024	Zbrojovka Brno	7	(0)

International career^{‡}
2019–	Guinea	13	(0)
- * Club domestic league appearances and goals as of 25 January 2024 ‡ National team caps and goals as of 15 August 2023 (UTC)

Youssouf Kamso Mara (born 24 December 1994) is a Guinean professional footballer who plays as a midfielder.

== Club career ==
Mara began his career in France before moving to the Czech Republic with Vlašim. He made his professional debut with Vlašim in a 2–1 Czech National Football League win over Baník Sokolov on 30 July 2017. On 18 July 2018, Mara transferred to Slovan Liberec. On 15 August 2023, Mara signed a one-year contract with option with Zbrojovka Brno.

== International career ==
Born in Guinea, Mara is of Ivorian descent. Mara debuted for the Guinea national team in a 1–0 friendly loss to Comoros on 12 October 2019.
