= Přepeře (Semily District) =

- Municipality
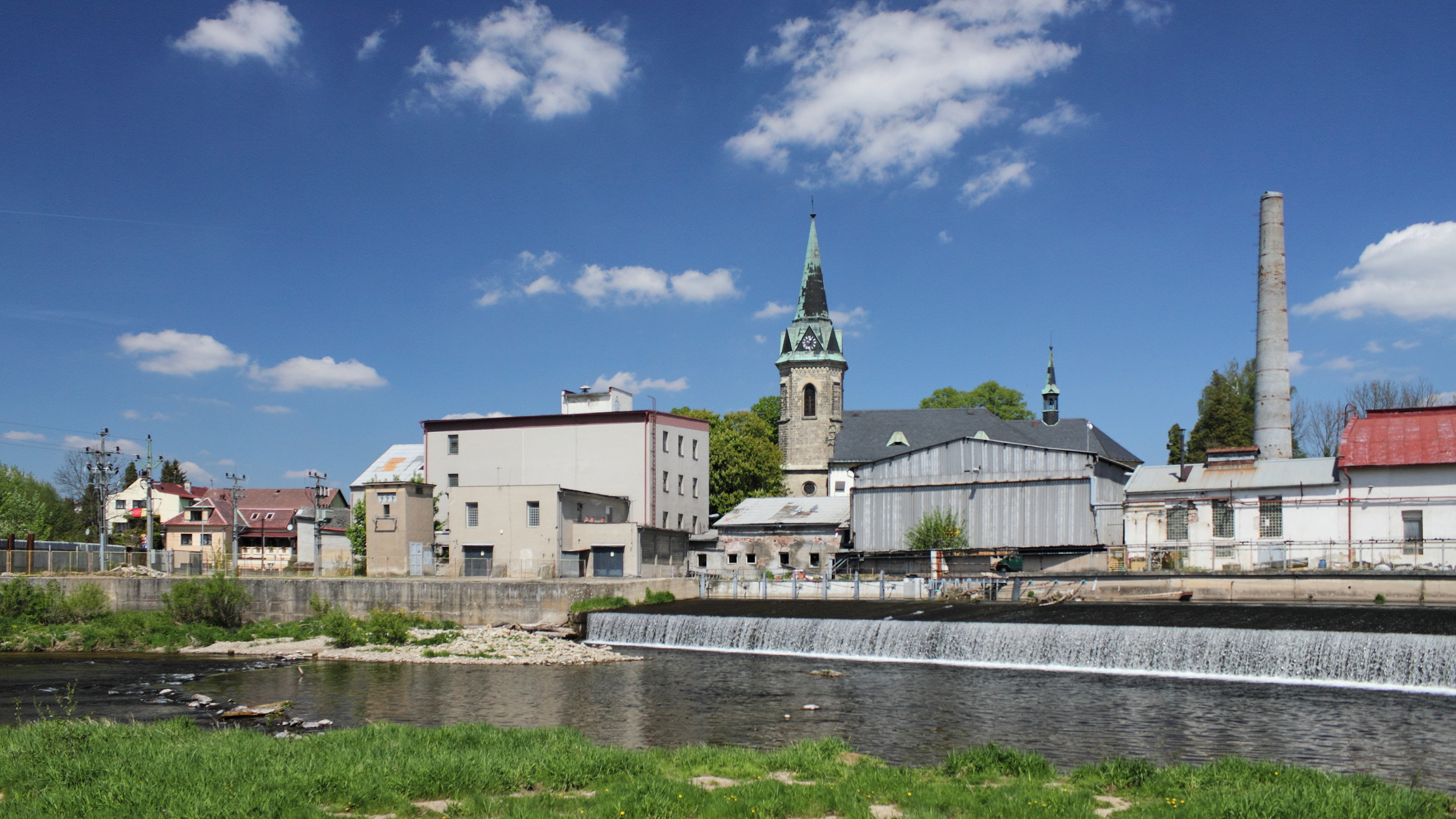
- View over the Jizera River towards the Church of Saint James the Great

- Flag Coat of arms

- Location in the Czech Republic
- Coordinates: 50°34′59″N 15°6′46″E
- Country: Czech Republic
- Region: Liberec
- District: Semily
- First mentioned: 1323

Area
  - Total: 3.45 km^{2} (1.33 sq mi)
- Elevation: 245 m (804 ft)

Population (2026-01-01)
  - Total: 1,067
  - Density: 309/km^{2} (801/sq mi)
- Time zone: UTC+1 (CET)
  - Summer (DST): UTC+2 (CEST)
- Postal code: 512 61
- Website: prepere.cz

Přepeře is a municipality and village in Semily District in the Liberec Region of the Czech Republic. It has about 1,100 inhabitants.

== Demographics ==
Historical population
Year	Pop.	±%
1869	386	—
1880	508	+31.6%
1890	572	+12.6%
1900	590	+3.1%
1910	775	+31.4%
1921	728	−6.1%
1930	1,111	+52.6%
1950	786	−29.3%
1961	807	+2.7%
1970	774	−4.1%
1980	754	−2.6%
1991	784	+4.0%
2001	857	+9.3%
2011	876	+2.2%
2021	964	+10.0%
Source: Censuses

== Sights ==
The main landmark of Přepeře is the Church of Saint James the Great. It was built in the late Gothic style in 1545–1557. In 1871–1873, it was modified in the neo-Gothic style.
