= Michal Sadílek =

Czech footballer (born 1999)

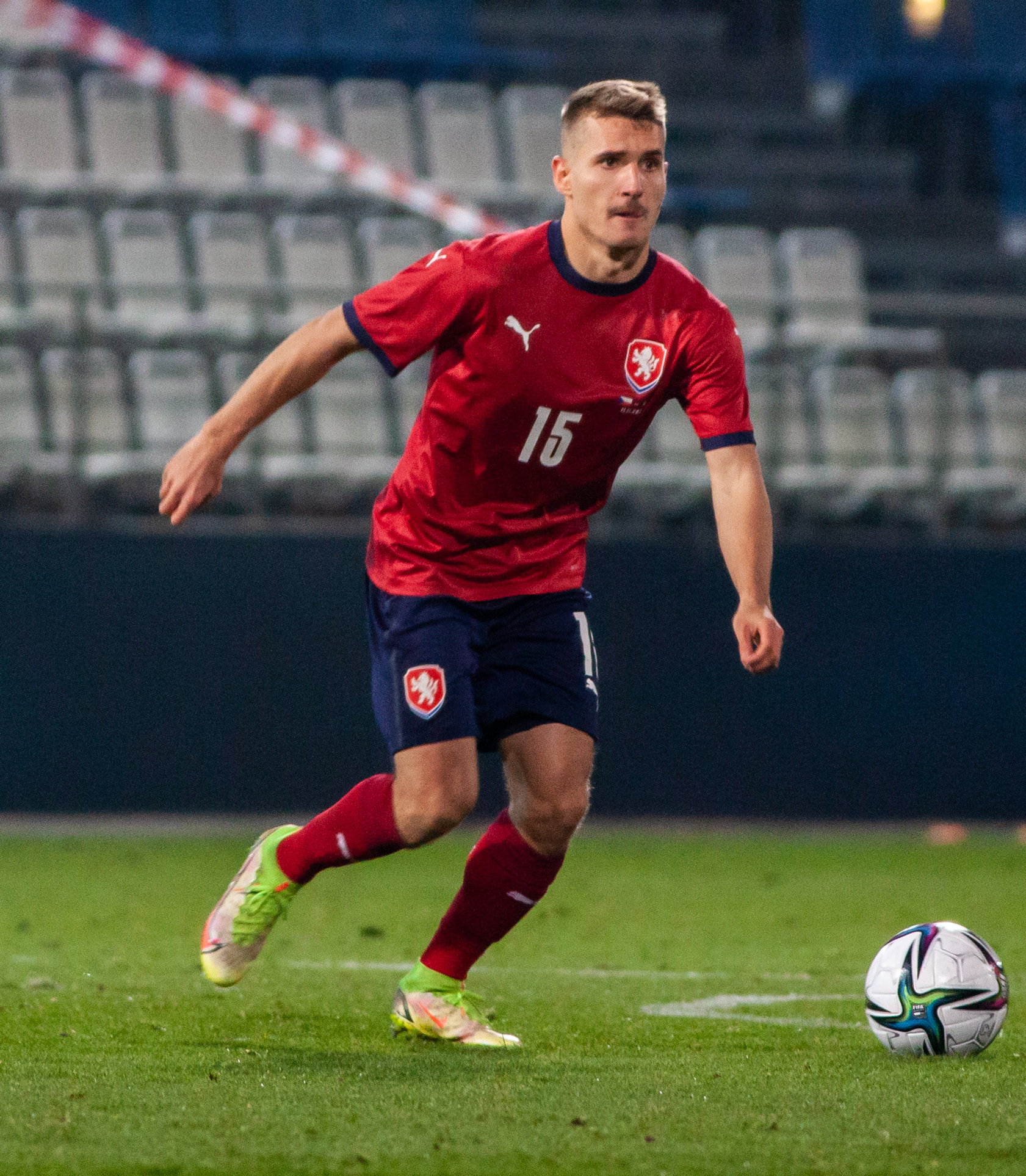
- Sadílek playing for the Czech Republic in 2021

Personal information
- Date of birth: 31 May 1999 (age 27)
- Place of birth: Uherské Hradiště, Czech Republic
- Height: 1.69 m (5 ft 7 in)
- Position: Midfielder

Team information
- Current team: Slavia Prague
- Number: 23

Youth career
- –2015: 1. FC Slovácko
- 2015–2018: PSV

Senior career*
Years	Team	Apps	(Gls)
2016–2019	Jong PSV	10	(0)
2018–2022	PSV	27	(2)
2020–2021	→ Slovan Liberec (loan)	8	(0)
2021–2022	→ Twente (loan)	30	(1)
2022–2025	Twente	71	(6)
2025–	Slavia Prague	41	(2)

International career^{‡}
2014	Czech Republic U16	5	(0)
2014–2016	Czech Republic U17	30	(9)
2016	Czech Republic U18	3	(1)
2016–2018	Czech Republic U19	29	(4)
2018	Czech Republic U20	5	(0)
2019–2021	Czech Republic U21	15	(0)
2021–	Czech Republic	43	(2)
- * Club domestic league appearances and goals as of 31 October 2026 ‡ National team caps and goals as of 15 November 2026

Michal Sadílek (Czech pronunciation: [ˈmɪxal ˈsaɟiːlɛk]; born 31 May 1999) is a Czech professional footballer who plays as a midfielder for Czech First League club Slavia Prague and the Czech Republic national team.

== Club career ==
Sadílek made his professional debut in the Eerste Divisie for Jong PSV on 4 November 2016 in a game against Helmond Sport. On 7 August 2021, he joined FC Twente on loan. On 19 April 2022, the deal was made permanent as he signed a two-year contract. On 2 June 2025, Sadílek signed a contract with Czech First League club Slavia Prague until June 2028.

== International career ==
Having represented Czech Republic at all youth levels, Sadílek was called up to the Czech senior squad by coach Jaroslav Šilhavý in May 2019.

In May 2021, he was announced as one of the four additional players for the rescheduled UEFA Euro 2020, if Ondřej Kúdela failed to appeal against a ten-match ban from UEFA due to an alleged racial slur. Eventually, Sadílek got priority over Lukáš Kalvach, Patrizio Stronati and David Pavelka and filled the last vacant place in the nomination.

Sadílek debuted with the senior Czech Republic national team on 4 June 2021, in a friendly 4–0 loss to Italy.

Sadílek was selected in the 26-man squad for the UEFA Euro 2024 on 28 May 2024, but had to withdraw before the tournament after injuring his leg when falling off his tricycle.

On 31 May 2026, Sadílek was selected in the 26-man squad for the 2026 FIFA World Cup. On 18 June, Sadílek scored in Czechia's opening 1–1 tie against South Africa in the 6th minute, their earliest goal in the competition since 2006.

== Personal life ==
His brother Lukáš is also a professional footballer.

== Career statistics ==
=== Club ===
As of match played 31 October 2026

Appearances and goals by club, season and competition
Club	Season	League			National cup (Note: Includes KNVB Cup, Czech Cup)		Europe		Other		Total	
Club	Season	Division	Apps	Goals	Apps	Goals	Apps	Goals	Apps	Goals	Apps	Goals
Jong PSV	2016–17	Eerste Divisie	2	0	—		—		—		2	0
Jong PSV	2017–18	Eerste Divisie	2	0	—		—		—		2	0
Jong PSV	2018–19	Eerste Divisie	5	0	—		—		—		5	0
Jong PSV	2019–20	Eerste Divisie	2	0	—		—		—		2	0
Jong PSV	Total		11	0	—		—		—		11	0
PSV	2018–19	Eredivisie	11	1	1	0	1 (Note: Appearance(s) in UEFA Champions League)	0	0	0	13	1
PSV	2019–20	Eredivisie	14	1	0	0	9 (Note: Two appearances in UEFA Champions League, seven appearances in UEFA Europa League)	0	1 (Note: Appearance in Johan Cruyff Shield)	0	24	1
PSV	2020–21	Eredivisie	2	0	0	0	1 (Note: Appearance(s) in UEFA Europa League)	0	—		3	0
PSV	2021–22	Eredivisie	0	0	0	0	0	0	0	0	0	0
PSV	Total		27	2	1	0	11	0	1	0	40	2
Slovan Liberec (loan)	2020–21	Czech First League	24	6	2	0	5	0	—		31	6
Twente (loan)	2021–22	Eredivisie	30	1	2	0	—		—		32	1
Twente	2022–23	Eredivisie	17	2	0	0	4 (Note: Appearance(s) in UEFA Conference League)	0	—		21	2
Twente	2023–24	Eredivisie	31	1	1	0	6	0	—		38	1
Twente	2024–25	Eredivisie	23	3	2	0	6	0	—		31	3
Twente	Total		71	6	3	0	16	0	—		89	6
Slavia Prague	2025–26	Czech First League	29	1	2	1	8	0	0	0	39	2
Slavia Prague	2026–27	Czech First League	12	1	1	0	3	0	—		16	1
Slavia Prague	Total		41	2	3	1	11	0	0	0	55	3
Career total			204	17	11	1	43	0	1	0	259	18

=== International ===
As of match played 15 November 2026

Appearances and goals by national team and year
National team	Year	Apps	Goals
Czech Republic	2021	8	0
Czech Republic	2022	6	0
Czech Republic	2023	7	1
Czech Republic	2024	3	0
Czech Republic	2025	7	0
Czech Republic	2026	12	1
Total		43	2

Scores and results list Czech Republic's goal tally first, score column indicates score after each Sadílek goal.

List of international goals scored by Michal Sadílek
No.	Date	Venue	Cap	Opponent	Score	Result	Competition
1	20 June 2023	City Stadium, Podgorica, Montenegro	16	Montenegro	2–0	4–1	Friendly
2	18 June 2026	Mercedes-Benz Stadium, Atlanta, United States	37	South Africa	1–0	1–1	2026 FIFA World Cup

== Honours ==
Slavia Prague

- Czech First League: 2025–26

Individual

- Toulon Tournament Best XI: 2017
- Eredivisie Team of the Month: August 2023
