= Jan Šulc (footballer) =

Czech footballer

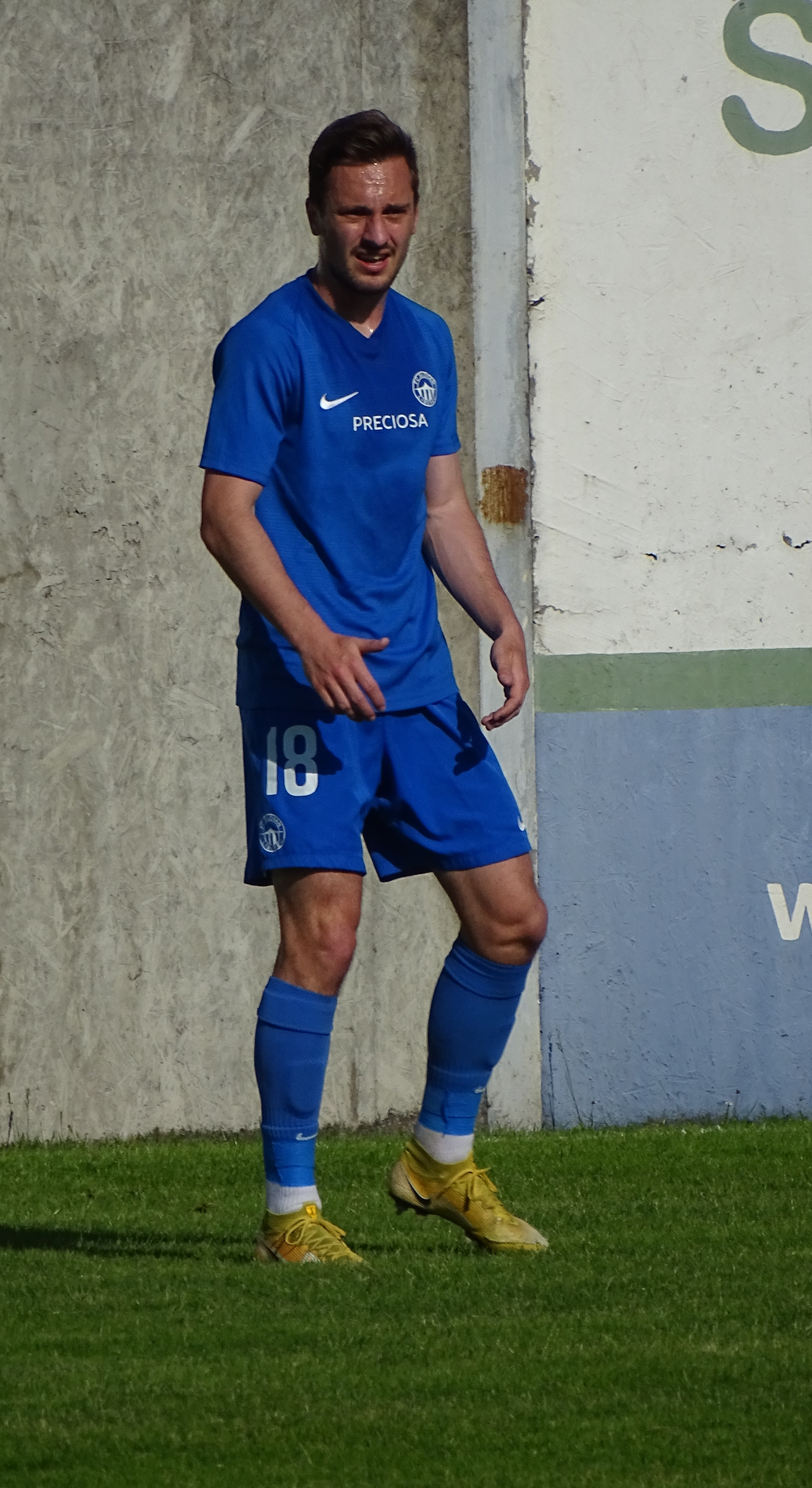
- Šulc in 2022

Personal information
- Date of birth: 2 June 1998 (age 28)
- Height: 1.69 m (5 ft 7 in)
- Position: Wide midfielder

Team information
- Current team: Zápy

Youth career
- Slovan Liberec

Senior career*
Years	Team	Apps	(Gls)
2017–2022	Slovan Liberec	2	(0)
2017–2018	→ Varnsdorf (loan)	12	(0)
2018	→ Znojmo (loan)	6	(0)
2022–2023	Přepeře	0	(0)
2023	→ Motorlet Prague (loan)	0	(0)
2023–2025	Motorlet Prague	0	(0)
2025–	Zápy	0	(0)
- * Club domestic league appearances and goals as of 14:04, 11 July 2019 (UTC)

Jan Šulc (born 29 May 1998) is a professional Czech football left or right midfielder currently playing for Zápy in the Bohemian Football League.

He made his senior league debut for Liberec on 1 May 2017 in a Czech First League 4–1 home win against Bohemians 1905.
