= 2021–22 Bohemians 1905 season =

Bohemians 1905
2021–22 season
- Chairman: Antonín Panenka
- Manager: Luděk Klusáček
- Stadium: Ďolíček
- Czech First League: 13th
- Czech Cup: Pre-season
Home colours	Away colours

The 2021–22 season is the 29th season in the existence of Bohemians 1905 and the club's 8th consecutive season in the top flight of Czech football. In addition to the domestic league, Bohemians 1905 are participating in this season's edition of the Czech Cup.

== Players ==
=== First-team squad ===
As of 7 July 2021.

Note: Flags indicate national team as defined under FIFA eligibility rules; some limited exceptions apply. Players may hold more than one non-FIFA nationality.

No.	Pos.	Nation	Player
1	GK	CZE	Roman Valeš
2	MF	CZE	Jan Kovařík
4	MF	CZE	Josef Jindřišek
5	DF	CZE	David Bartek
6	MF	RUS	Vladislav Levin
7	MF	CZE	Petr Hronek
9	FW	FRA	Ibrahim Keita
10	FW	CZE	Matěj Koubek
11	MF	CZE	Vojtěch Novák
13	FW	CZE	Pavel Osmančík
15	DF	CZE	Daniel Krch
16	DF	CZE	Martin Dostál
17	MF	CZE	Jan Vodháněl
19	MF	CZE	Roman Květ
20	DF	CZE	Jan Vondra

No.	Pos.	Nation	Player
22	MF	CZE	Jakub Fulnek (on loan from Mladá Boleslav)
23	DF	CZE	Daniel Köstl
24	FW	CZE	David Puškáč
25	MF	CZE	Kamil Vacek
26	GK	CZE	Marek Kouba
27	DF	CZE	Jiří Bederka
28	DF	CZE	Lukáš Hůlka
29	FW	NGR	Michael Ugwu
32	DF	CZE	Martin Nový
37	FW	CZE	Tomáš Necid
77	FW	CZE	Jan Chramosta (on loan from FK Jablonec)
89	GK	SVK	Patrik Le Giang
99	GK	CZE	Hugo Jan Bačkovský (on loan from Sparta Prague)
—	MF	CZE	Michal Vrána

=== Out on loan ===
Note: Flags indicate national team as defined under FIFA eligibility rules; some limited exceptions apply. Players may hold more than one non-FIFA nationality.

No.	Pos.	Nation	Player
—	MF	CZE	Antonín Vaníček (to FK Jablonec)
—	MF	VIE	Tony Lê Tuấn Anh (to Binh Dinh FC)

No.	Pos.	Nation	Player
—	MF	NGR	Marvis Ogiomade (to Vlašim)

== Competitions ==
=== Overall record ===
Competition	First match	Last match	Starting round	Final position	Record							
Competition	First match	Last match	Starting round	Final position	Pld	W	D	L	GF	GA	GD	Win %
Czech First League	24 July 2021	14 May 2022	Matchday 1	14th	35	8	10	17	45	61	−16	22.86
Czech First League relegation play-offs	19 May 2022	22 May 2022	First leg	Winners	2	2	0	0	3	0	+3	100.00
Czech Cup	25 August 2021	15 February 2022	Second round	Quarter-finals	4	3	0	1	12	2	+10	75.00
Total					41	13	10	18	60	63	−3	31.71

Source: Soccerway

=== Czech First League ===
==== League table ====
Pos	Team	Pld	W	D	L	GF	GA	GD	Pts	Qualification or relegation
12	Teplice	30	8	3	19	29	49	−20	27	Qualification for the relegation group
13	Jablonec	30	4	14	12	22	45	−23	26	Qualification for the relegation group
14	Bohemians 1905	30	6	8	16	34	56	−22	26	Qualification for the relegation group
15	Pardubice	30	5	9	16	35	67	−32	24	Qualification for the relegation group
16	Karviná	30	3	8	19	30	52	−22	17	Qualification for the relegation group

Source: Fortuna Liga
Rules for classification: 1) Points; 2) Head-to-head points; 3) Head-to-head goal difference; 4) Head-to-head goals scored; 5) Goal difference; 6) Goals scored; 7) Fair-play ranking; 8) Draw.

Pos	Team	Pld	W	D	L	GF	GA	GD	Pts	Qualification or relegation	PCE	ZLN	JAB	BOH	TEP	KAR
11	Pardubice	35	9	10	16	42	68	−26	37		—	1–1	—	—	—	2–0
12	Fastav Zlín	35	9	9	17	43	60	−17	36		—	—	1–1	1–4	3–0	—
13	Jablonec	35	6	16	13	27	48	−21	34		0–1	—	—	1–1	—	2–0
14	Bohemians 1905 (O)	35	8	10	17	45	61	−16	34	Qualification for the relegation play-offs	0–1	—	—	—	—	4–0
15	Teplice (O)	35	8	5	22	33	59	−26	29	Qualification for the relegation play-offs	0–2	—	0–1	2–2	—	—
16	Karviná (R)	35	3	10	22	33	63	−30	19	Relegation to the FNL	—	1–1	—	—	2–2	—

Source: Fortuna Liga
Legend: Blue = home team win; Yellow = draw; Red = away team win.
Rules for classification: 1) Total points; 2) Points earned in regular season; 3) Head-to-head points (regular season); 4) Head-to-head goal difference (regular season); 5) Head-to-head goals scored (regular season); 5) Goal difference (all matches); 6) Goals scored (all matches); 7) Fair-play ranking; 8) Draw.
(O) Play-off winners; (R) Relegated

==== Results summary ====
Overall								Home						Away					
Pld	W	D	L	GF	GA	GD	Pts	W	D	L	GF	GA	GD	W	D	L	GF	GA	GD
35	8	10	17	45	61	−16	34	6	4	7	26	23	+3	2	6	10	19	38	−19

Source: Fortuna Liga

==== Matches ====
24 July 2021 1	Hradec Králové	1–1	Bohemians 1905	Mladá Boleslav
16:00 CEST (UTC+2)	Vašulín 15'	Report	Puškáč 53'	Stadium: Lokotrans Aréna (Note: Hradec Králové played their home matches in Mladá Boleslav due to the rebuilding of their own Všesportovní stadion.); Attendance: 1,216; Referee: Pavel Julínek

1 August 2021 2	Bohemians 1905	1–2	Viktoria Plzeň	Prague
19:00 CEST (UTC+2)	Puškáč 23' (pen.)	Report	Beauguel 52' (pen.); Káčer 72'	Stadium: Ďolíček; Attendance: 3,584; Referee: Jan Machálek

8 August 2021 3	Jablonec	2–2	Bohemians 1905	Jablonec nad Nisou
16:00 CEST (UTC+2)	Pilař 77' (pen.); Čvančara 83'	Report	Puškáč 16'; Kovařík 90+4' (pen.)	Stadium: Stadion Střelnice; Attendance: 2,693; Referee: Tomáš Klíma

14 August 2021 4	Bohemians 1905	1–1	Sparta Prague	Prague
19:00 CEST (UTC+2)	Dostál 45+2'	Report	Pavelka 55'	Stadium: Ďolíček; Attendance: 3,905; Referee: Ondřej Pechanec

21 August 2021 5	Pardubice	3–0	Bohemians 1905	Prague
16:00 CEST (UTC+2)	Chytil 31'; Černý 65'; Solil 83'	Report		Stadium: Ďolíček (Note: Pardubice continued playing their home matches in Ďolíček due to the rebuilding of their own stadium Pod Vinicí.); Attendance: 2,384; Referee: Karel Hrubeš

29 August 2021 6	Bohemians 1905	4–2	Teplice	Prague
16:00 CEST (UTC+2)	Chramosta 41' (pen.), 59' (pen.); Krch 45+2'; Koubek 90+3'	Report	Mareš 22'; Fortelný 89'	Stadium: Ďolíček; Attendance: 3,379; Referee: Miroslav Zelinka

11 September 2021 7	Zlín	1–3	Bohemians 1905	Zlín
16:00 CEST (UTC+2)	Tkáč 68'	Report	Keita 14'; Dostál 55'; Koubek 79'	Stadium: Letná Stadion; Attendance: 2,474; Referee: Petr Hocek

19 September 2021 8	Bohemians 1905	1–5	Slavia Prague	Prague
19:00 CEST (UTC+2)	Chramosta 22'	Report	Stanciu 56' (pen.); Lingr 63'; Kuchta 65'; Krmenčík 72' (pen.); Schranz 76'	Stadium: Ďolíček; Attendance: 5,485; Referee: Ondřej Berka

25 September 2021 9	Baník Ostrava	4–1	Bohemians 1905	Ostrava
16:00 CEST (UTC+2)	Budínský 38'; Kuzmanović 48'; Pokorný 66'; Almási 74'	Report	Chramosta 10'	Stadium: Městský stadion Attendance: 6,969; Referee: Pavel Franěk

2 October 2021 10	Bohemians 1905	2–0	Sigma Olomouc	Prague
16:00 CEST (UTC+2)	Köstl 23'; Chramosta 25'	Report		Stadium: Ďolíček; Attendance: 3,553; Referee: Ladislav Szikszay

16 October 2021 11	Mladá Boleslav	4–1	Bohemians 1905	Mladá Boleslav
16:00 CEST (UTC+2)	Ewerton 65'; Jurásek 79'; Fila 89'; Skalák 90+4' (pen.)	Report	Puškáč 61'	Stadium: Lokotrans Aréna; Attendance: 2,429; Referee: Tomáš Batík

23 October 2021 12	Slovácko	1–0	Bohemians 1905	Uherské Hradiště
16:00 CEST (UTC+2)	Cicilia 90+3'	Report		Stadium: Městský fotbalový stadion Miroslava Valenty; Attendance: 4,203; Referee: Dalibor Černý

6 November 2021 14	Slovan Liberec	2–1	Bohemians 1905	Liberec
15:00 CET (UTC+1)	Chaluš 73'; Tupta 90'	Report	Puškáč 78'	Stadium: Stadion u Nisy; Attendance: 2,981; Referee: Marek Radina

20 November 2021 15	Bohemians 1905	3–1	České Budějovice	Prague
15:00 CET (UTC+1)	Keita 24'; Hronek 35'; Koubek 88'	Report	Bassey 59'	Stadium: Ďolíček; Attendance: 3,496; Referee: Tomáš Klíma

27 November 2021 16	Viktoria Plzeň	6–0	Bohemians 1905	Plzeň
18:00 CET (UTC+1)	Pernica 10'; Kopic 31'; Mosquera 36'; Bucha 62'; Sýkora 64'; Kayamba 79'	Report		Stadium: Doosan Arena; Attendance: 1,000; Referee: Ondřej Berka

1 December 2021 13	Bohemians 1905	3–0	Karviná	Prague
18:00 CET (UTC+1)	Puškáč 22'; Köstl 24'; Necid 81'	Report		Stadium: Ďolíček; Attendance: 1,000; Referee: Pavel Franěk
Note: The match was postponed due to the isolation and quarantine measures imposed on the Karviná team.

5 December 2021 17	Bohemians 1905	1–2	Jablonec	Prague
15:00 CET (UTC+1)	Hronek 85'	Report	Čvančara 8'; Houska 45+1'	Stadium: Ďolíček; Attendance: 1,000; Referee: Ladislav Szikszay

12 December 2021 18	Sparta Prague	5–1	Bohemians 1905	Prague
18:00 CET (UTC+1)	Pulkrab 15', 40', 42'; Pavelka 44'; Hancko 53'	Report		Stadium: Stadion Letná; Attendance: 1,000; Referee: Pavel Orel

18 December 2021 19	Bohemians 1905	1–2	Pardubice	Prague
15:00 CET (UTC+1)	Necid 67'	Report	Chytil 22'; Černý 56'	Stadium: Ďolíček; Attendance: 1,000; Referee: Miroslav Zelinka

5 February 2022 20	Teplice	1–0	Bohemians 1905	Teplice
15:00 CET (UTC+1)	Vondrášek 33'	Report		Stadium: Na Stínadlech; Attendance: 1,000; Referee: Ondřej Berka

12 February 2022 21	Bohemians 1905	1–0	Zlín	Prague
15:00 CET (UTC+1)	Hronek 5'	Report		Stadium: Ďolíček; Attendance: 1,000; Referee: Jana Adámková

20 February 2022 22	Slavia Prague	1–0	Bohemians 1905	Prague
18:00 CET (UTC+1)	Olayinka 43'	Report		Stadium: Fortuna Arena; Attendance: 9,682; Referee: Jan Machálek

26 February 2022 23	Bohemians 1905	0–2	Baník Ostrava	Prague
15:00 CET (UTC+1)		Report	Kuzmanović 75'; Almási 83'	Stadium: Ďolíček; Attendance: 2,346; Referee: Petr Hocek

5 March 2022 24	Sigma Olomouc	0–0	Bohemians 1905	Olomouc
15:00 CET (UTC+1)		Report		Stadium: Andrův stadion Attendance: 2,678; Referee: Ondřej Berka

12 March 2022 25	Bohemians 1905	2–2	Mladá Boleslav	Prague
15:00 CET (UTC+1)	Petrák 5'; Krch 46'	Report	Ladra 14'; Smrž 81'	Stadium: Ďolíček; Attendance: 3,856; Referee: Jan Petřík

19 March 2022 26	Bohemians 1905	1–2	Slovácko	Prague
15:00 CET (UTC+1)	Puškáč 9' (pen.)	Report	Šašinka 33'; Sadílek 64'	Stadium: Ďolíček; Attendance: 3,988; Referee: Josef Krejsa

3 April 2022 27	Karviná	1–1	Bohemians 1905	Karviná
16:00 CEST (UTC+2)	Šehić 24'	Report	Květ 69'	Stadium: Městský stadion Attendance: 2,056; Referee: Petr Hocek

9 April 2022 28	Bohemians 1905	0–0	Slovan Liberec	Prague
16:00 CEST (UTC+2)		Report		Stadium: Ďolíček; Attendance: 3,812; Referee: Ondřej Berka

17 April 2022 29	České Budějovice	2–1	Bohemians 1905	České Budějovice
17:00 CEST (UTC+2)	van Buren 39'; Skovajsa 64'	Report	Květ 20' (pen.)	Stadium: Stadion Střelecký ostrov Attendance: 4,113; Referee: Miroslav Zelinka

20 April 2022 30	Bohemians 1905	1–1	Hradec Králové	Prague
18:00 CEST (UTC+2)	Hronek 62'	Report	Kučera 51'	Stadium: Ďolíček; Attendance: 2,712; Referee: Josef Krejsa

==== Relegation group ====
23 April 2022 31	Teplice	2–2	Bohemians 1905	Teplice
17:00 CEST (UTC+2)	Trubač 51'; Vondrášek 71'	Report	Křapka 33'; Hronek 55'	Stadium: Na Stínadlech; Attendance: 2,131; Referee: Miroslav Zelinka

1 May 2022 32	Bohemians 1905	0–1	Pardubice	Prague
16:00 CEST (UTC+2)		Report	Hranáč 8'	Stadium: Ďolíček; Attendance: 3,955; Referee: Dalibor Černý

7 May 2022 33	Fastav Zlín	1–4	Bohemians 1905	Zlín
16:00 CEST (UTC+2)	Dramé 30'	Report	Hronek 12'; Chramosta 21'; Vraštil 27' (o.g.); Květ 39'	Stadium: Letná Stadion; Attendance: 2,650; Referee: Zbyněk Proske

10 May 2022 34	Jablonec	1–1	Bohemians 1905	Jablonec nad Nisou
19:00 CEST (UTC+2)	Pilař 38'	Report	Hronek 90+3'	Stadium: Stadion Střelnice; Attendance: 2,578; Referee: Ladislav Szikszay

14 May 2022 35	Bohemians 1905	4–0	Karviná	Prague
18:00 CEST (UTC+2)	Puškáč 24', 27', 47', 52'	Report		Stadium: Ďolíček; Attendance: 4,028; Referee: Miroslav Zelinka

==== Relegation play-offs ====
19 May 2022 First leg	Opava	0–1	Bohemians 1905	Opava
17:00 CEST (UTC+2)		Report	Květ 4'	Stadium: Stadion v Městských sadech Attendance: 3,876; Referee: Dalibor Černý

22 May 2022 Second leg	Bohemians 1905	2–0 (3–0 agg.)	Opava	Prague
16:00 CEST (UTC+2)	Köstl 17'; Chramosta 68'	Report		Stadium: Ďolíček; Attendance: 6,095; Referee: Miroslav Zelinka
Note: Bohemians 1905 won 3–0 on aggregate and retained its position in Czech First League.

=== Czech Cup ===
25 August 2021 Second round	Baník Sokolov	0–6	Bohemians 1905	Sokolov
17:00 CEST (UTC+2)	Fulnek 9', 85'; Novák 35', 51'; Köstl 60'; Květ 75'	Report		Stadium: Stadion FK Baník Sokolov

22 September 2021 Third round	Prostějov	0–4	Bohemians 1905	Prostějov
15:30 CEST (UTC+2)	Kovařík 68' (pen.); Necid 73'; Koubek 83'; Hronek 90'	Report		Stadium: Stadion Za Místním nádražím Referee: Jan Petřík

26 October 2021 Fourth round	Bohemians 1905	1–0	Vysočina Jihlava	Prague
17:30 CEST (UTC+2)	Květ 55' (pen.)	Report		Stadium: Ďolíček; Referee: Tomáš Klíma

15 February 2022 Quarter-finals	Hradec Králové	2–1 (a.e.t.)	Bohemians 1905	Mladá Boleslav
16:00 CET (UTC+1)	Prekop 90'; Vašulín 107'	Report	Puškáč 10'	Stadium: Lokotrans Aréna; Referee: Tomáš Klíma
