= 2022–23 Bohemians 1905 season =

Bohemians 1905
2022–23 season
- Chairman: Antonín Panenka
- Manager: Jaroslav Veselý
- Stadium: Ďolíček
- Czech First League: 7th
- Czech Cup: Quarter-finals
Home colours

The 2022–23 season is the 118th in the history of Bohemians 1905 and their 10th consecutive season in the top flight. The club will participate in the Czech First League and the Czech Cup.

== Players ==
As of 10 December 2022

Note: Flags indicate national team as defined under FIFA eligibility rules; some limited exceptions apply. Players may hold more than one non-FIFA nationality.

No.	Pos.	Nation	Player
1	GK	CZE	Roman Valeš
3	DF	SRB	Stefan Vilotić
4	MF	CZE	Josef Jindřišek
5	DF	CZE	David Bartek
6	MF	CZE	Michal Beran (on loan from Slavia Prague)
8	MF	CZE	Adam Jánoš
9	FW	CZE	Ladislav Mužík (on loan from Mladá Boleslav)
11	MF	CZE	Vojtěch Novák
12	MF	CZE	Jan Kovařík
14	DF	CZE	Adam Kadlec
15	DF	CZE	Daniel Krch
16	DF	CZE	Martin Dostál
18	DF	CZE	Denis Vala
19	MF	CZE	Roman Květ

No.	Pos.	Nation	Player
20	FW	CZE	Václav Drchal (on loan from Sparta Prague)
21	GK	CZE	Lukáš Soukup
23	DF	CZE	Daniel Köstl
24	FW	CZE	David Puškáč
28	DF	CZE	Lukáš Hůlka
30	MF	CZE	Jan Morávek
31	MF	CZE	Ondřej Petrák
32	DF	CZE	Martin Nový
33	FW	SVK	Erik Prekop
34	DF	CZE	Antonín Křapka
37	FW	CZE	Tomáš Necid
80	MF	CZE	Martin Hála
99	GK	CZE	Hugo Jan Bačkovský (on loan from Sparta Prague)
—	MF	CZE	Jan Matoušek

=== Out on loan ===
Note: Flags indicate national team as defined under FIFA eligibility rules; some limited exceptions apply. Players may hold more than one non-FIFA nationality.

No.	Pos.	Nation	Player
—	MF	CZE	Daniel Mareček (at Mladá Boleslav)
—	FW	CZE	Pavel Osmančík (at Příbram)
—	MF	CZE	Lukáš Musil (at Příbram)

No.	Pos.	Nation	Player
—	DF	CZE	Radek Lehovec (at Vlašim)
—	MF	CZE	Michal Vrána (at Chrudim)

== Pre-season and friendlies ==
Win Draw Loss Fixtures

28 June 2022 Friendly	Bohemians 1905 (Czech Republic)	5–3	(Czech Republic) Táborsko
CEST (UTC+2)

2 July 2022 Friendly	Bohemians 1905 (Czech Republic)	2–1	(Poland) Cracovia
CEST (UTC+2)

9 July 2022 Friendly	St. Pölten (Austria)	1–3	(Czech Republic) Bohemians 1905
CEST (UTC+2)

12 July 2022 Friendly	Ujpest (Hungary)	0–1	(Czech Republic) Bohemians 1905
CEST (UTC+2)

15 July 2022 Friendly	Liefering (Austria)	0–2	(Czech Republic) Bohemians 1905
CEST (UTC+2)

24 July 2022 Friendly	Bohemians 1905 (Czech Republic)	2–2	(Czech Republic) Příbram
CEST (UTC+2)

16 January 2023 Friendly	Zagłębie Lubin (Poland)	v	(Czech Republic) Bohemians 1905
--:-- CET (UTC+1)

== Competitions ==
=== Overall record ===
Competition	First match	Last match	Starting round	Final position	Record							
Competition	First match	Last match	Starting round	Final position	Pld	W	D	L	GF	GA	GD	Win %
Czech First League	30 July 2022	27 May 2023	Matchday 1	4th	35	15	7	13	57	58	−1	42.86
Czech Cup	21 September 2022	5 April 2023	Second round	Semi-finals	5	4	0	1	12	5	+7	80.00
Total					40	19	7	14	69	63	+6	47.50

Source: Soccerway

=== Czech First League ===
==== Regular season ====
Pos	Team	Pld	W	D	L	GF	GA	GD	Pts	Qualification or relegation
2	Slavia Prague	30	20	6	4	81	25	+56	66	Qualification for the championship group
3	Viktoria Plzeň	30	17	6	7	55	29	+26	57	Qualification for the championship group
4	Bohemians 1905	30	14	6	10	53	49	+4	48	Qualification for the championship group
5	Slovácko	30	13	7	10	36	38	−2	46	Qualification for the championship group
6	Sigma Olomouc	30	10	11	9	45	40	+5	41	Qualification for the championship group

Source: Fortuna Liga
Rules for classification: 1) Points; 2) Head-to-head points; 3) Head-to-head goal difference; 4) Head-to-head goals scored; 5) Goal difference; 6) Goals scored; 7) Fair-play ranking; 8) Draw.

==== Results summary ====
Overall								Home						Away					
Pld	W	D	L	GF	GA	GD	Pts	W	D	L	GF	GA	GD	W	D	L	GF	GA	GD
0	0	0	0	0	0	0	0	0	0	0	0	0	0	0	0	0	0	0	0

Source: Fortuna Liga

==== Results by round ====
Round	1
Ground	
Result	
Position	

Source: Fortuna Liga
A = Away; H = Home; W = Win; D = Draw; L = Loss

==== Matches ====
The league fixtures were announced on 22 June 2022.

31 July 2022 1	Jablonec	0–3	Bohemians 1905	Jablonec nad Nisou
16:00 CEST (UTC+2)		Report	Petrák 37'; Květ 70'; Jánoš 87'	Stadium: Stadion Střelnice; Attendance: 3,051; Referee: Ondřej Černý

6 August 2022 2	Bohemians 1905	3–3	Baník Ostrava	Prague
19:00 CEST (UTC+2)	Hronek 7'; Květ 19'; Křapka 22'	Report	Kuzmanović 5'; Klíma 49'; Tijani 79'	Stadium: Ďolíček; Attendance: 6,012; Referee: Tomáš Klíma

13 August 2022 3	Teplice	0–1	Bohemians 1905	Teplice
16:00 CEST (UTC+2)		Report	Křapka 85'	Stadium: Na Stínadlech; Attendance: 3,634; Referee: Tomáš Batík

22 August 2022 4	Bohemians 1905	1–2	Hradec Králové	Prague
19:00 CEST (UTC+2)	Puškáč 37' (pen.)	Report	Kubala 23'; Vlkanova 30'	Stadium: Ďolíček; Attendance: 4,321; Referee: Miroslav Zelinka

27 August 2022 5	Sparta Prague	1–1	Bohemians 1905	Prague
19:00 CEST (UTC+2)	Čvančara 53'	Report	Hronek 10'	Stadium: Stadion Letná; Attendance: 17,305; Referee: Pavel Orel

30 August 2022 6	Bohemians 1905	1–2	České Budějovice	Prague
17:30 CEST (UTC+2)	Puškáč 59'	Report	Škoda 13'; Sluka 84'	Stadium: Ďolíček; Attendance: 4,202; Referee: Zbyněk Proske

4 September 2022 7	Zbrojovka Brno	1–2	Bohemians 1905	Brno
16:00 CEST (UTC+2)	Ševčík 48'	Report	Puškáč 3' (pen.); Křapka 40'	Stadium: Městský fotbalový stadion Srbská; Attendance: 5,526; Referee: Michal Křepský

11 September 2022 8	Bohemians 1905	0–2	Slovan Liberec	Prague
16:00 CEST (UTC+2)		Report	Valenta 2'; Červ 47'	Stadium: Ďolíček; Attendance: 4,411; Referee: Pavel Orel

18 September 2022 9	Pardubice	0–1	Bohemians 1905	Prague
16:00 CEST (UTC+2)		Report	Jánoš 55'	Stadium: Ďolíček; Attendance: 2,047; Referee: Jan Machálek

1 October 2022 10	Bohemians 1905	1–1	Viktoria Plzeň	Prague
16:00 CEST (UTC+2)	Drchal 53'	Report	Mosquera 24'	Stadium: Ďolíček; Attendance: 5,712; Referee: Miroslav Zelinka

9 October 2022 11	Slovácko	2–4	Bohemians 1905	Uherské Hradiště
16:00 CEST (UTC+2)	Reinberk 77'; Daníček 90+4' (pen.)	Report	Květ 16', 53', 80'; Prekop 45+2'	Stadium: Městský fotbalový stadion Miroslava Valenty; Attendance: 4,042; Referee: Jan Petřík

15 October 2022 12	Bohemians 1905	1–1	Sigma Olomouc	Prague
16:00 CEST (UTC+2)	Dostál 70'	Report	Poulolo 3'	Stadium: Ďolíček; Attendance: 4,892; Referee: Tomáš Batík

23 October 2022 13	Mladá Boleslav	4–3	Bohemians 1905	Mladá Boleslav
16:00 CEST (UTC+2)	Mareček 45+3', 86'; Pech 62'; Šimek 83'	Report	Květ 4' (pen.), 73' (pen.); Drchal 58'	Stadium: Lokotrans Aréna; Attendance: 2,676; Referee: Ondřej Berka

30 October 2022 14	Bohemians 1905	1–4	Slavia Prague	Prague
15:00 CET (UTC+1)	Květ 2'	Report	Olayinka 3', 79'; Jurečka 30' (pen.); Lingr 76'	Stadium: Ďolíček; Attendance: 6,088; Referee: Tomáš Klíma

5 November 2022 15	Bohemians 1905	3–2	Zlín	Prague
15:00 CET (UTC+1)	Křapka 55'; Hůlka 67'; Květ 86'	Report	Fillo 30'; Chanturishvili 36'	Stadium: Ďolíček; Attendance: 4,671; Referee: Ladislav Szikszay

12 November 2022 16	Baník Ostrava	4–1	Bohemians 1905	Ostrava
15:00 CET (UTC+1)	Tetour 9' (pen.); Plavšić 35'; Almási 73', 80'	Report	Kovařík 63'	Stadium: Městský Stadion; Attendance: 7,556; Referee: Michal Křepský

28 January 2023 17	Bohemians 1905	2–0	Teplice	Prague
15:00 CET (UTC+1)	Puškáč 56', 74'	Report		Stadium: Ďolíček; Attendance: 3,312; Referee: Petr Hocek

5 February 2023 18	Hradec Králové	0–2	Bohemians 1905	Mladá Boleslav
15:00 CET (UTC+1)		Report	Hůlka 7'; Drchal 41'	Stadium: Lokotrans Aréna (Note: Hradec Králové played their home matches in Mladá Boleslav due to the rebuilding of their own Všesportovní stadion, which would finish in June 2023.); Attendance: 1,039; Referee: Dalibor Černý

12 February 2023 19	Bohemians 1905	2–6	Sparta Prague	Prague
18:00 CET (UTC+1)	Čermák 48', 70' (pen.)	Report	Krejčí 15', 60' (pen.); Haraslín 56'; Čvančara 67'; Kuchta 81'; Minchev 90+3'	Stadium: Ďolíček; Attendance: 6,012; Referee: Ladislav Szikszay

19 February 2023 20	České Budějovice	1–0	Bohemians 1905	České Budějovice
15:00 CET (UTC+1)	Potočný 84'	Report		Stadium: Stadion Střelecký ostrov Attendance: 1,974; Referee: Marek Radina

23 February 2023 21	Bohemians 1905	1–1	Zbrojovka Brno	Prague
15:00 CET (UTC+1)	Prekop 50'	Report	Řezníček 70'	Stadium: Ďolíček; Attendance: 4,079; Referee: Jan Všetečka

5 March 2023 22	Slovan Liberec	1–3	Bohemians 1905	Liberec
14:00 CET (UTC+1)	Prebsl 54'	Report	Drchal 17'; Matoušek 45+1', 74'	Stadium: Stadion u Nisy; Attendance: 1,432; Referee: Dalibor Černý

12 March 2023 23	Bohemians 1905	2–0	Pardubice	Prague
18:00 CET (UTC+1)	Hála 37'; Prekop 60'	Report		Stadium: Ďolíček; Attendance: 4,579; Referee: Miroslav Zelinka

19 March 2023 24	Viktoria Plzeň	1–2	Bohemians 1905	Plzeň
18:00 CET (UTC+1)	Vydra 28'	Report	Chorý 53' (o.g.); Köstl 85'	Stadium: Doosan Arena; Attendance: 9,344; Referee: Marek Radina

2 April 2023 25	Bohemians 1905	1–0	Slovácko	Prague
19:00 CEST (UTC+2)	Köstl 49'	Report		Stadium: Ďolíček; Attendance: 4,912; Referee: Pavel Orel

9 April 2023 26	Sigma Olomouc	2–2	Bohemians 1905	Olomouc
16:00 CEST (UTC+2)	Chytil 37', 51'	Report	Matoušek 25', 54'	Stadium: Andrův stadion Attendance: 4,007; Referee: Dominik Starý

16 April 2023 27	Bohemians 1905	4–0	Mladá Boleslav	Prague
16:00 CEST (UTC+2)	Matoušek 40'; Kovařík 62'; Prekop 74'; Drchal 90+1'	Report		Stadium: Ďolíček; Attendance: 5,279; Referee: Lukáš Nehasil

22 April 2023 28	Slavia Prague	3–0	Bohemians 1905	Prague
19:00 CEST (UTC+2)	Jurečka 13'; Olayinka 31'; Douděra 36'	Report		Stadium: Fortuna Arena; Attendance: 18,974; Referee: Miroslav Zelinka

26 April 2023 29	Zlín	4–1	Bohemians 1905	Zlín
17:30 CEST (UTC+2)	Slončík 31', 90+3'; Vukadinović 53'; Hrubý 71'	Report	Puškáč 68'	Stadium: Letná Stadion; Attendance: 3,133; Referee: Dalibor Černý

30 April 2023 30	Bohemians 1905	4–1	Jablonec	Prague
15:00 CEST (UTC+2)	Matoušek 9'; Jindřišek 20' (pen.); Drchal 54'; Prekop 89'	Report	Šulc 79'	Stadium: Ďolíček; Attendance: 5,679; Referee: Tomáš Batík

==== Championship group ====
Pos	Team	Pld	W	D	L	GF	GA	GD	Pts	Qualification or relegation	SPA	SLA	PLZ	BOH	SLO	OLO
1	Sparta Prague (C)	35	23	9	3	76	33	+43	78	Qualification for the Champions League third qualifying round	—	3–2	0–1	2–1	—	—
2	Slavia Prague	35	24	6	5	98	31	+67	78	Qualification for the Europa League third qualifying round (Note: Slavia Prague qualified for the Europa League as Czech Cup winners.)	—	—	2–1	6–0	4–0	—
3	Viktoria Plzeň	35	18	7	10	60	38	+22	61	Qualification for the Europa Conference League second qualifying round	—	—	—	0–2	2–2	1–3
4	Bohemians 1905	35	15	7	13	56	58	−2	52	Qualification for the Europa Conference League second qualifying round	—	—	—	—	0–0	0–1
5	Slovácko	35	13	11	11	40	46	−6	50		0–0	—	—	—	—	2–2
6	Sigma Olomouc	35	12	12	11	53	47	+6	48		0–1	2–3	—	—	—	—

Source: Fortuna Liga
Legend: Blue = home team win; Yellow = draw; Red = away team win.
Rules for classification: 1) Total points; 2) Points earned in regular season; 3) Head-to-head points (regular season); 4) Head-to-head goal difference (regular season); 5) Head-to-head goals scored (regular season); 5) Goal difference (all matches); 6) Goals scored (all matches); 7) Fair-play ranking; 8) Draw.
(C) Champions

===== Matches =====
7 May 2023 31	Slavia Prague	6–0	Bohemians 1905	Prague
18:00 CEST (UTC+2)	Jurečka 30', 48', 53', 84'; Douděra 57'; van Buren 82'	Report		Stadium: Fortuna Arena; Attendance: 17,132; Referee: Ladislav Szikszay

14 May 2023 32	Bohemians 1905	0–0	Slovácko	Prague
18:00 CEST (UTC+2)		Report		Stadium: Ďolíček; Attendance: 5,812; Referee: Miroslav Zelinka

20 May 2023 33	Sparta Prague	2–1	Bohemians 1905	Prague
15:00 CEST (UTC+2)	Krejčí 69' (pen.); Kuchta 85'	Report	Jánoš 58'	Stadium: Stadion Letná; Attendance: 17,155; Referee: Ladislav Szikszay

23 May 2023 34	Viktoria Plzeň	0–2	Bohemians 1905	Plzeň
19:00 CEST (UTC+2)		Report	Hála 2'; Hůlka 39'	Stadium: Doosan Arena; Attendance: 7,561; Referee: Jan Všetečka

27 May 2023 35	Bohemians 1905	0–1	Sigma Olomouc	Prague
16:00 CEST (UTC+2)		Report	Beneš 87'	Stadium: Ďolíček; Attendance: 5,812; Referee: Dalibor Černý
