= 2020–21 Bohemians 1905 season =

Bohemians 1905
2020–21 season
- Chairman: Antonín Panenka
- Manager: Luděk Klusáček
- Stadium: Ďolíček
- Czech First League: 10th
- Czech Cup: Fourth round
- Top goalscorer: League: Petr Hronek (3 goals); All: Petr Hronek (3 goals)
- Highest home attendance: 3,089
- Lowest home attendance: 0
- Average home league attendance: 1,544
Home colours	Away colours

The 2020–21 season was Bohemians 1905' 28th season in the Czech First League. In addition to the domestic league, Bohemians 1905 participated in this season's editions of the Czech Cup. The season covered the period from 1 July 2020 to 30 June 2021.

== First team squad ==
As of 3 July 2020.

Note: Flags indicate national team as defined under FIFA eligibility rules; some limited exceptions apply. Players may hold more than one non-FIFA nationality.

No.	Pos.	Nation	Player
1	GK	CZE	Roman Valeš
2	DF	CZE	Milan Havel
3	DF	GER	Till Schumacher
4	MF	CZE	Josef Jindřišek
5	DF	CZE	David Bartek
6	MF	RUS	Vladislav Levin
7	MF	CZE	Petr Hronek (on loan from Fastav Zlín)
8	FW	CZE	Matěj Pulkrab (on loan from Sparta Prague)
9	FW	FRA	Ibrahim Keita
10	FW	CZE	Jakub Nečas
14	DF	CZE	Michal Šmíd
15	DF	CZE	Daniel Krch
16	DF	CZE	Martin Dostál

No.	Pos.	Nation	Player
17	MF	CZE	Jan Vodháněl
20	MF	CZE	Jakub Rada
21	DF	CZE	Lukáš Pokorný (on loan from Slavia Prague)
22	MF	CZE	Antonín Vaníček
23	DF	CZE	Daniel Köstl
24	FW	CZE	David Puškáč
25	MF	CZE	Kamil Vacek
26	GK	CZE	Marek Kouba
27	DF	CZE	Jiří Bederka
28	DF	CZE	Lukáš Hůlka
29	FW	NGR	Michael Ugwu
39	MF	CZE	Jakub Podaný (on loan from Dukla Prague)
89	GK	SVK	Patrik Le Giang

== Pre-season ==
=== Friendly match ===
Win Draw Loss Fixtures Postponed

11 August 2020 Friendly	Pardubice	0–0	Bohemians 1905	Lázně Bohdaneč
17:30 CEST (UTC+2)	Vodháněl 11'; Dostál (yellow card) 45'	Report	Řezníček 23'; Mareš (yellow card) 74'	Stadium: Na Baště; Referee: Braun Beneš

15 August 2020 Friendly	Bohemians 1905	1–1	Teplice	Prague
17:00 CEST (UTC+2)	Vodháněl 11'; Dostál (yellow card) 45'	Report	Řezníček 23'; Mareš (yellow card) 74'	Stadium: Ďolíček

3 September 2020 Friendly	Sparta Prague	1–2	Bohemians 1905	Prague
17:00 CEST (UTC+2)	Minchev 5'	Report	Bartek 54'; Köstl 88'	Stadium: Stadion Letná

9 October 2020 Friendly	Viktoria Žižkov	0–0	Bohemians 1905	Žižkov
10:30 CEST (UTC+2)		Report		Stadium: Seifertova ulice Attendance: 0 Referee: BlažeJ Flimmel

13 November 2020 Friendly	Hradec Králové	0–2	Bohemians 1905	Hradec Králové
11:00 CEST (UTC+2)		Report	Pulkrab 34'; Vodháněl 54'	Stadium: Všesportovní stadion Attendance: 0

== Competitions ==
=== Overview ===
Competition	First match	Last match	Starting round	Final position	Record							
Competition	First match	Last match	Starting round	Final position	Pld	W	D	L	GF	GA	GD	Win %
Czech First League	23 August 2020	29 May 2021	Matchday 1	10th	34	10	13	11	40	37	+3	29.41
Czech Cup	16 September 2020	9 March 2021	Third round	Fourth round	2	1	0	1	2	2	+0	50.00
Total					36	11	13	12	42	39	+3	30.56

Source: Competitions

=== Czech First League ===
==== League table ====
Pos	Team	Pld	W	D	L	GF	GA	GD	Pts
8	Baník Ostrava	34	13	10	11	48	38	+10	49
9	Sigma Olomouc	34	11	12	11	40	40	0	45
10	Bohemians 1905	34	10	13	11	40	37	+3	43
11	Mladá Boleslav	34	10	9	15	49	54	−5	39
12	Karviná	34	9	12	13	37	49	−12	39

Source: Fortuna Liga
Rules for classification: 1) Points; 2) Head-to-head points; 3) Head-to-head goal difference; 4) Head-to-head goals scored; 5) Goal difference; 6) Goals scored; 7) Fair-play ranking; 8) Draw.

==== Results summary ====
Overall								Home						Away					
Pld	W	D	L	GF	GA	GD	Pts	W	D	L	GF	GA	GD	W	D	L	GF	GA	GD
34	10	13	11	40	37	+3	43	7	7	3	23	14	+9	3	6	8	17	23	−6

Source: Fortuna Liga

==== Results by round ====
Round	1	2	3	4	5	6	7	8	9	10	11	12	13	14	15	16	17	18	19	20	21	22	23	24	25	26	27	28	29	30	31	32	33	34
Ground	H	A	A	H	H	A	H	A	A	H	A	H	A	H	A	H	A	H	H	A	H	A	H	A	H	A	H	A	H	A	H	A	H	A
Result	W	D	L	L	W	L	W	L	L	D	L	W	L	D	D	L	W	W	D	L	D	D	W	D	D	W	D	W	D	D	W	D	L	L
Position	2	3	4	10	9	12	10	11	12	12	13	13	13	13	13	14	12	12	12	13	13	13	12	11	11	10	10	10	10	9	9	9	9	10

Source: Fortuna Liga
A = Away; H = Home; W = Win; D = Draw; L = Loss

==== Matches ====
Win Draw Loss

23 August 2020 1	Bohemians 1905	4–0	Mladá Boleslav	Prague
18:00 CEST (UTC+2)	Köstl (yellow card) 10'; Puškáč 13'; Jindřišek 31' (pen.); Bartek 75'; Dostál 82'	Report	Klíma (yellow card) 30'; Mazuch (yellow card) 55'; Mašek (yellow card) 61'	Stadium: Ďolíček; Attendance: 1,450; Referee: Pavel Rejžek

30 August 2020 2	Zbrojovka Brno	0–0	Bohemians 1905	Brno
16:30 CEST (UTC+2)	Sedlák (yellow card) 64'; Adrián (yellow card) 89'	Report	Levin (yellow card) 90+1'	Stadium: Městský fotbalový stadion Srbská; Attendance: 2,499; Referee: Zybnek Proske

11 September 2020 3	Sigma Olomouc	3–0	Bohemians 1905	Olomouc
18:00 CEST (UTC+2)	Látal (yellow card) 34'; David 42', 85' (pen.); Jemelka (yellow card) 55'; Mojmír Chytil 90+1'	Report	Jindřišek (yellow card) 66'; Vaníček (yellow card) 78'; Lukáš Hůlka (yellow card) 83'	Stadium: Andrův stadion Attendance: 2,337; Referee: Jan Cihlář

19 September 2020 4	Bohemians 1905	1–4	Viktoria Plzeň	Prague
19:00 CEST (UTC+2)	Vacek (yellow card) 38'; Vaníček 86'	Report	Ondrášek 30'; Ba Loua 33'; Hejda (yellow card) 68'; Kopic 73'; Kalvach (yellow card) 77'; Beauguel 85'	Stadium: Ďolíček; Attendance: 3,089; Referee: Pavel Julínek

4 October 2020 5	Bohemians 1905	2–0	Fastav Zlín	Prague
15:30 CEST (UTC+2)	Hronek 32'; Keita 86'	Report		Stadium: Ďolíček; Attendance: 1,905; Referee: Ondřej Lerch

8 November 2020 6	Karviná	2–1	Bohemians 1905	Karviná
14:00 CET (UTC+1)	Bartošák 8'; Šindelář (yellow card) 24'; Twardzik (yellow card) 30'; Qose 72' (pen.); Neuman (yellow card) 90+3'	Report	Keita (yellow card) 32'; Hůlka (yellow card) 38'; Hůlka 59'; Vaníček (yellow card) 90+4'	Stadium: Městský stadion Attendance: 0 Referee: Pavel Julínek

21 November 2020 7	Bohemians 1905	2–0	Teplice	Prague
16:00 CET (UTC+1)	Hronek 13'; Pulkrab 49' (pen.)	Report	Kučera (yellow card) 31'; Vukadinović (yellow card) 47'; Řezníček (yellow card) 48'; Žitný (yellow card) 78'	Stadium: Ďolíček; Attendance: 0 Referee: Ondřej Berka

25 November 2020 8	České Budějovice	2–1	Bohemians 1905	České Budějovice
17:00 CET (UTC+1)	Čolić 38' (pen.); Mészáros 44'; Čavoš (yellow card) 52'; Talovierov (yellow card) 78'	Report	Vacek (yellow card) 37'; Vondra (yellow card) 59'; Hůlka 61'; Květ (yellow card) 80'; Pulkrab (yellow card) 89'	Stadium: Stadion Střelecký ostrov Attendance: 0 Referee: Ondřej Pechanec

8 December 2020 9	Jablonec	2–1	Bohemians 1905	Jablonec
17:00 CET (UTC+1)	Hrubý 21'; Považanec (yellow card) 42'; Kubista (yellow card) 61', (goal) 68'; Schranz (yellow card) 77'; Krob (yellow card) 86'	Report	Hronek (yellow card) 10'; Köstl (yellow card) 20'; Vondra (yellow card) 30'; Levin (yellow card) 37'; Novak 86'	Stadium: Stadion Střelnice; Attendance: 0 Referee: Petr Ardeleanu

5 December 2020 10	Bohemians 1905	1–1	Pardubice	Prague
18:00 CET (UTC+1)	Necid 7'; Köstl (yellow card) 58'; Necid (yellow card) 70'; Hronek (yellow card) 73'	Report	Huf 63'	Stadium: Ďolíček; Attendance: 0 Referee: Karel Hrubes

12 December 2020 11	Baník Ostrava	1–0	Bohemians 1905	Ostrava
18:30 CET (UTC+1)	Jánoš 22'; Svozil (yellow card) 60'; Potočný (yellow card) 70'	Report	Necid (yellow card) 45+2', (yellow card) 48' (yellow-red card); Köstl (yellow card) 82'	Stadium: Městský stadion Attendance: 0 Referee: Alex Denev

15 December 2020 12	Bohemians 1905	2–1	Příbram	Prague
16:00 CET (UTC+1)	Vacek 25'; Novák 73'	Report	Folprecht 43'; Vávra (yellow card) 53'; Vais (yellow card) 90+2'	Stadium: Ďolíček; Attendance: 0 Referee: Miroslav Zelinka

20 December 2020 13	Slavia Prague	2–1	Bohemians 1905	Prague
18:30 CET (UTC+01:00)	Sima 7'; Provod (yellow card) 55', (goal) 66'; Masopust (yellow card) 65'	Report	Dostál (yellow card) 43'; Hronek 68'	Stadium: Sinobo Stadium; Attendance: 0 Referee: Pavel Franěk

16 January 2021 15	Slovan Liberec	1–1	Bohemians 1905	Liberec
16:00 CET (UTC+01:00)	Mosquera 13'; Mikula (yellow card) 28'; Karafiát (yellow card) 80'	Report	Bederka (yellow card) 36'; Pulkrab 70'	Stadium: Stadion u Nisy; Attendance: 0 Referee: Ondřej Lerch

23 January 2021 16	Bohemians 1905	1–3	Slovácko	Prague
16:00 CET (UTC+01:00)	Puškáč 73'; Necid (penalty missed); Vodháněl (yellow card) 90'	Report	Kalabiška 25', (yellow card) 77'; Kliment 32' (pen.), 37' (pen.); Kubala (yellow card) 90'; Nemrava (yellow card) 90+2'	Stadium: Ďolíček; Attendance: 0 Referee: Pavel Orel

27 January 2021 14	Bohemians 1905	0–0	Opava	Prague
16:00 CET (UTC+01:00)	Vacek (yellow card) 43'	Report	Juřena (yellow card) 75'; Fendrich (yellow card) 90+6'	Stadium: Ďolíček; Attendance: 0 Referee: Ondřej Cieslar

30 January 2021 17	Sparta Prague	0–1	Bohemians 1905	Prague
18:30 CET (UTC+1)	Hancko (yellow card) 77'	Report	Necid 13'; Vaníček (yellow card) 37'; Levin (yellow card) 54', (penalty missed); Puškáč (yellow card) 89'	Stadium: Stadion Letná; Attendance: 0 Referee: Karel Hrubeš

6 February 2021 18	Bohemians 1905	2–1	Zbrojovka Brno	Prague
16:00 CET (UTC+1)	Necid 10'; Květ 41'; Bederka (yellow card) 90'; Pulkrab (yellow card) 90+2'	Report	Růsek 26'; Pernica (yellow card) 89'; Sedlák (yellow card) 90+1'; Vaněk (yellow card) 90+2'	Stadium: Ďolíček; Attendance: 0 Referee: Ondřej Pechanec

14 February 2021 19	Bohemians 1905	0–0	Sigma Olomouc	Prague
14:00 CET (UTC+1)	Bederka (yellow card) 64'; Pulkrab (yellow card) 86'	Report	Látal (yellow card) 42'; Zmrzlý (yellow card) 74'; Zifčák (yellow card) 90+3'	Stadium: Ďolíček; Attendance: 0 Referee: Pavel Julínek

21 February 2021 20	Viktoria Plzeň	3–1	Bohemians 1905	Plzeň
14:00 CET (UTC+1)	Kayamba 43'; Bucha 61'; Beauguel 65' (pen.); Kalvach (yellow card) 89'; Kaša (yellow card) 90+1'	Report	Jindřišek (penalty missed); Levin (yellow card) 86'; Pulkrab 87'	Stadium: Doosan Arena; Attendance: 0 Referee: Ondrej Ginzel

27 February 2021 21	Bohemians 1905	1–1	České Budějovice	Prague
16:00 CET (UTC+1)	Bartek 72', (yellow card) 76'; Jindřišek (yellow card) 83'	Report	Havel (yellow card) 37'; Čolić 79' (pen.)	Stadium: Ďolíček; Attendance: 0 Referee: Petr Hocek

6 March 2021 22	Fastav Zlín	0–0	Bohemians 1905	Zlín
16:00 CET (UTC+1)	Procházka (yellow card) 62'; Chanturishvili (yellow card) 69'; Simerský (penalty missed)	Report	Pulkrab (yellow card) 82'	Stadium: Letná Stadion; Attendance: 0 Referee: Tomáš Klíma

14 March 2021 23	Bohemians 1905	2–0	Karviná	Prague
14:00 CET (UTC+1)	Schumacher 3'; Květ (yellow card) 32'; Bartek 88'	Report	Tavares (yellow card) 32'; Eduardo (yellow card) 34'; Herc (yellow card) 53'	Stadium: Ďolíček; Attendance: 0 Referee: Zbynek Proske

21 March 2021 24	Teplice	1–1	Bohemians 1905	Teplice
14:00 CET (UTC+1)	Kodad 82'	Report	Pulkrab 65', (yellow card) 72'	Stadium: Na Stínadlech; Attendance: 0 Referee: Pavel Orel

2 April 2021 25	Bohemians 1905	0–0	Jablonec	Prague
18:00 CEST (UTC+2)	Hronek (yellow card) 61'; Puškáč (yellow card) 67'	Report	Haitl (yellow card) 9'; Hrubý (yellow card) 90+1'; Krob (yellow card) 90+4'	Stadium: Stadion FC Čechie Uhříněves; Attendance: 0 Referee: Ondřej Pechanec

9 April 2021 26	Pardubice	0–2	Bohemians 1905	Pardubice
18:15 CEST (UTC+2)	Tischler (yellow card) 41'; Prosek (red card) 43'; Lee (yellow card) 87'	Report	Puškáč 35' (pen.); Osmancik 46'	Stadium: Pod Vinicí; Attendance: 0 Referee: Ondřej Berka

16 April 2021 27	Bohemians 1905	1–1	Baník Ostrava	Prague
18:00 CEST (UTC+2)	Květ (yellow card) 39'; Novak 90+3'	Report	Fillo (yellow card) 31'; Jánoš (yellow card) 78'; Dyjan 84'	Stadium: Ďolíček; Attendance: 0 Referee: Emanuel Marek

21 April 2021 28	Příbram	1–4	Bohemians 1905	Příbram
15:00 CEST (UTC+2)	Soldát (yellow card) 26'; Mezera (yellow card) 54'; Lubega 79'	Report	Květ (yellow card) 15', (goal) 75' (pen.); Keita 58', 77'; Vondra 70'	Stadium: Na Litavce; Attendance: 0 Referee: Petr Hocek

25 April 2021 29	Bohemians 1905	0–0	Slavia Prague	Prague
18:30 CEST (UTC+2)	Krch (yellow card) 18'; Bederka (yellow card) 38'; Hronek (yellow card) 77'	Report	Abdulla Yusuf Helal (yellow card) 90+1'	Stadium: Ďolíček; Attendance: 0 Referee: Pavel Julinek

1 May 2021 30	Opava	1–1	Bohemians 1905	Opava
15:00 CEST (UTC+2)	Didiba (yellow card) 34'; Dedič (yellow card) 36'; Helešic 41' (pen.); Holík (yellow card) 58'	Report	Kosek (yellow card) 3'; Keita (yellow card) 40'; Puškáč 57'; Levin (yellow card) 60'; Pulkrab (yellow card) 81'; Vacek (yellow card) 86'; Necid (yellow card) 87'	Stadium: Stadium Municipal Garden; Attendance: 366; Referee: Alex Denev

8 May 2021 31	Bohemians 1905	3–0	Slovan Liberec	Prague
19:30 CEST (UTC+2)	Necid (yellow card) 25', (goal) 57'; Pulkrab (yellow card) 26', (goal) 51' (pen.); Květ (yellow card) 33'; Vondra (yellow card) 63'; Hronek 82'; Keita (yellow card) 85'	Report	Knobloch (yellow card) 50'; Rabušic (yellow card) 64'; Karafiát (yellow card) 68'	Stadium: Ďolíček; Attendance: 382; Referee: Jan Machálek

15 May 2021 32	Slovácko	1–1	Bohemians 1905	Uherské Hradiště
19:30 CEST (UTC+2)	Havlík 10'; Sadílek (yellow card) 81'	Report	Levin 25'; Bačkovský (yellow card) 85'	Stadium: Městský fotbalový stadion Miroslava Valenty; Attendance: 760; Referee: Zbyněk Proske

23 May 2021 33	Bohemians 1905	1–2	Sparta Praha	Prague
17:00 CEST (UTC+2)	Puškáč 35'; Dostál (yellow card) 53'; Necid (yellow card) 74'; Hronek (yellow card) 90+1'	Report	Juliš 1'; Pavelka 61'; Wiesner (yellow card) 64'; Souček (yellow card) 78'	Stadium: Ďolíček; Attendance: 734; Referee: Ondřej Berka

29 May 2021 34	Mladá Boleslav	3–1	Bohemians 1905	Mladá Boleslav
17:00 CEST (UTC+2)	Drchal 17'; Matějovský (yellow card) 34'; Řezník 51'; Škoda 87'	Report	Necid 71'	Stadium: Lokotrans Aréna; Attendance: 428; Referee: Karel Hrubeš

=== Czech Cup ===
==== Results ====
Win Draw Loss

16 September 2020 Third round	Velvary	0–2	Bohemians 1905	Slovan Velvary
16:00 (CEST) (UTC+2)		Report	Květ 3'; Novák 61'	Stadium: TJ Slovan Velvary

9 March 2021 Fourth round	Bohemians 1905	0–2	Sigma Olomouc	Prague
17:00 (CEST) (UTC+2)	Hronek (yellow card) 70'	Report	Houska 19', 51'; Breite (yellow card) 57'; González 59'	Stadium: Ďolíček; Attendance: 0 Referee: Miroslav Zelinka

== Statistics ==
=== Appearances and goals ===
No.	Pos	Nat	Player	Total		Czech First League		Cup	
No.	Pos	Nat	Player	Apps	Goals	Apps	Goals	Apps	Goals

=== Goal scorers ===
Rank	Position	Name	Fortuna Liga	MOL Cup	Total
1	MF	Petr Hronek	3	0	3
1	MF	Vojtěch Novák	2	1	3
1	FW	Ibrahim Keita	3	0	3
4	DF	Lukáš Hůlka	2	0	2
4	MF	Roman Květ	1	1	2
4	FW	David Puškáč	2	0	2
4	FW	Matěj Pulkrab	2	0	2
8	DF	Jan Vondra	1	0	1
8	DF	Martin Dostál	1	0	1
8	DF	Josef Jindřišek	1	0	1
8	MF	David Bartek	1	0	1
8	MF	Antonín Vaníček	1	0	1
8	FW	Pavel Osmančík	1	0	1
8	FW	Tomáš Necid	1	0	1
TOTAL			22	2	24

=== Assists ===
Rank	Position	Name	Fortuna Liga	MOL Cup	Total
1	MF	Antonín Vaníček	4	0	4
2	FW	Jakub Nečas	2	0	2
3	MF	Roman Květ	1	0	1
3	MF	Matěj Pulkrab	1	0	1
3	FW	Tomáš Necid	1	0	1
TOTAL			9	0	9

=== Clean sheets ===
No.	Position	Name	Czech First League	Cup	UEFA Champions League	UEFA Europa League	Total
1	GK	Roman Valeš	4	0	0	0	4
TOTAL			4	0	0	0	4
