= 2023–24 Bohemians 1905 season =

Bohemians 1905
2023–24 season
- Manager: Jaroslav Veselý
- Stadium: Ďolíček
- Czech First League: 11th
- Czech Cup: Fourth round
- UEFA Europa Conference League: Second qualifying round
- Average home league attendance: 5,299

The 2023–24 season is Bohemians 1905's 119th season in existence and 11th consecutive in the Czech First League. They also competed in the Czech Cup.

== Players ==
=== First-team squad ===
As of 22 February 2024

Note: Flags indicate national team as defined under FIFA eligibility rules; some limited exceptions apply. Players may hold more than one non-FIFA nationality.

| No. | Pos. | Nation | Player |
|---|---|---|---|
| 1 | GK | CZE | Roman Valeš |
| 2 | DF | CZE | Jan Shejbal |
| 2 | DF | CZE | Matěj Kadlec |
| 4 | MF | CZE | Josef Jindřišek |
| 6 | MF | CZE | Michal Beran (on loan from Slavia Prague) |
| 7 | DF | CZE | Matěj Hybš |
| 8 | MF | CZE | Adam Jánoš |
| 9 | FW | CZE | Ladislav Mužík |
| 10 | MF | CZE | Jan Matoušek |
| 11 | MF | CZE | Vojtěch Novák |
| 12 | GK | CZE | Michal Reichl |
| 14 | DF | CZE | Adam Kadlec |
| 16 | DF | CZE | Martin Dostál |
| 17 | MF | CZE | Martin Hála |
| 18 | DF | CZE | Denis Vala |
| 19 | MF | CZE | Jan Kovařík |

| No. | Pos. | Nation | Player |
|---|---|---|---|
| 20 | FW | CZE | Matyáš Kozák (on loan from Sparta Prague) |
| 21 | GK | CZE | Lukáš Soukup |
| 22 | DF | CZE | Jan Vondra |
| 23 | DF | CZE | Daniel Köstl |
| 24 | FW | CZE | David Puškáč |
| 28 | DF | CZE | Lukáš Hůlka |
| 29 | FW | CZE | David Huf (on loan from Pardubice) |
| 31 | DF | CZE | Ondřej Petrák |
| 33 | FW | SVK | Erik Prekop |
| 34 | DF | CZE | Antonín Křapka |
| 37 | FW | CZE | Tomáš Necid |
| 42 | MF | CZE | Vojtěch Smrž |
| 71 | GK | CZE | Jakub Šiman |
| 77 | FW | MKD | Milan Ristovski |
| 88 | MF | CZE | Robert Hrubý |

=== Out on loan ===
Note: Flags indicate national team as defined under FIFA eligibility rules; some limited exceptions apply. Players may hold more than one non-FIFA nationality.

| No. | Pos. | Nation | Player |
|---|---|---|---|
| — | DF | CZE | Martin Nový (at Zbrojovka Brno) |
| — | MF | CZE | Vladimír Zeman (at Táborsko) |

| No. | Pos. | Nation | Player |
|---|---|---|---|
| — | DF | CZE | Filip Dostál (at Vlašim) |

== Transfers ==
=== In ===
| Pos. | Player | Transferred from | Fee | Date | Source |

=== Out ===
| Pos. | Player | Transferred to | Fee | Date | Source |

== Pre-season and friendlies ==
Win Draw Loss Fixtures

| 24 June 2023 Friendly | Bohemians 1905 (Czech Republic) | 2–2 | (Czech Republic) MFK Chrudim |
| 11:00 |

| 29 June 2023 Friendly | Bohemians 1905 (Czech Republic) | 1–0 | (Hungary) Zalaegerszegi TE |
| 17:45 |

| 2 July 2023 Friendly | Osijek (Croatia) | 3–2 | (Czech Republic) Bohemians 1905 |
| 17:30 |

| 6 July 2023 Friendly | Bohemians 1905 (Czech Republic) | 2–0 | (Serbia) Partizan |
| 16:00 |

| 12 July 2023 Friendly | Bohemians 1905 (Czech Republic) | 4–1 | (Slovakia) FC Košice |
| 17:30 |

| 15 July 2023 Friendly | Bohemians 1905 (Czech Republic) | 6–0 | (Czech Republic) FC Vysočina Jihlava |
| 17:30 |

== Competitions ==
=== Overall record ===
| Competition | First match | Last match | Starting round | Final position | Record | | | | | | | |
| Competition | First match | Last match | Starting round | Final position | Pld | W | D | L | GF | GA | GD | Win % |
|---|---|---|---|---|---|---|---|---|---|---|---|---|
| Czech First League | 23 July 2023 | 27 April 2024 | Matchday 1 | | 29 | 7 | 11 | 11 | 27 | 39 | −12 | 24.14 |
| Relegation group | May 2024 | May 2024 | | | 0 | 0 | 0 | 0 | 0 | 0 | +0 | — |
| Czech Cup | 11 October 2023 | 1 November 2023 | Third round | Fourth round | 2 | 1 | 0 | 1 | 8 | 3 | +5 | 50.00 |
| UEFA Europa Conference League | 27 July 2023 | 3 August 2023 | Second qualifying round | Second qualifying round | 2 | 0 | 0 | 2 | 2 | 7 | −5 | 0.00 |
| Total | | | | | 33 | 8 | 11 | 14 | 37 | 49 | −12 | 24.24 |

Last updated: 20 April 2024
Source: Soccerway

=== Czech First League ===
==== League table ====
| Pos | Team | Pld | W | D | L | GF | GA | GD | Pts | Qualification or relegation |
|---|---|---|---|---|---|---|---|---|---|---|
| 9 | Hradec Králové | 30 | 9 | 10 | 11 | 32 | 38 | −6 | 37 | Qualification for the Play-off |
| 10 | Teplice | 30 | 9 | 9 | 12 | 31 | 40 | −9 | 36 | Qualification for the Play-off |
| 11 | Bohemians 1905 | 30 | 8 | 11 | 11 | 29 | 40 | −11 | 35 | Qualification for the Relegation group |
| 12 | Jablonec | 30 | 6 | 12 | 12 | 35 | 45 | −10 | 30 | Qualification for the Relegation group |
| 13 | Pardubice | 30 | 7 | 7 | 16 | 29 | 42 | −13 | 28 | Qualification for the Relegation group |

Source: Fortuna Liga
Rules for classification: 1) Points; 2) Head-to-head points; 3) Head-to-head goal difference; 4) Head-to-head goals scored; 5) Goal difference; 6) Goals scored; 7) Fair-play ranking; 8) Draw.

==== Results summary ====
| Overall | | | | | | | | Home | | | | | | Away | | | | | |
| Pld | W | D | L | GF | GA | GD | Pts | W | D | L | GF | GA | GD | W | D | L | GF | GA | GD |
|---|---|---|---|---|---|---|---|---|---|---|---|---|---|---|---|---|---|---|---|
| 20 | 6 | 6 | 8 | 17 | 26 | −9 | 24 | 3 | 4 | 3 | 8 | 9 | −1 | 3 | 2 | 5 | 9 | 17 | −8 |

Last updated: 12 February 2024.
Source: Fortuna Liga

==== Results by round ====
| Round | 1 | 2 | 3 | 4 | 5 | 6 | 7 | 8 | 9 | 10 | 11 | 12 | 13 | 14 | 15 | 16 | 17 | 18 | 19 | 20 | 21 | 22 | 23 | 24 | 25 | 26 | 27 | 28 | 29 | 30 |
|---|---|---|---|---|---|---|---|---|---|---|---|---|---|---|---|---|---|---|---|---|---|---|---|---|---|---|---|---|---|---|
| Ground | A | H | A | H | A | H | A | H | H | A | H | A | H | A | H | A | H | A | H | A | H | A | A | H | A | H | A | H | A | H |
| Result | W | L | W | L | L | W | L | D | W | L | D | W | L | L | W | D | D | L | D | D | L | D | D | D | D | W | L | L | D | |
| Position | 7 | 9 | 6 | 8 | 10 | 6 | 7 | 9 | 8 | 9 | 8 | 8 | 8 | 9 | 8 | 9 | 9 | 10 | 10 | 10 | 10 | 10 | 10 | 12 | 11 | 10 | 11 | 11 | 11 | |

Updated to match(es) played on 20 April 2024. Source:
A = Away; H = Home; W = Win; D = Draw; L = Loss

==== Matches ====
The league fixtures were unveiled on 21 June 2023.

| 22 July 2023 1 | Pardubice | 0–1 | Bohemians 1905 | Pardubice |
| 15:00 CEST (UTC+2) | | Report | Hůlka 5' | Stadium: CFIG Arena; Attendance: 3,817; Referee: Tomáš Batík |

| 30 July 2023 2 | Bohemians 1905 | 1–2 | Teplice | Prague |
| 15:00 CEST (UTC+2) | Puškáč 90+4' | Report | Trubač 43'; Jukl 59' | Stadium: Ďolíček; Attendance: 5,679; Referee: Pavel Orel |

| 6 August 2023 3 | Slovan Liberec | 0–1 | Bohemians 1905 | Liberec |
| 15:00 CEST (UTC+2) | | Report | Kozák 90+1' | Stadium: Stadion u Nisy; Attendance: 2,958; Referee: Ladislav Szikszay |

| 13 August 2023 4 | Bohemians 1905 | 0–1 | Slovácko | Prague |
| 15:00 CEST (UTC+2) | | Report | Hofmann 45+3' | Stadium: Ďolíček; Attendance: 5,612; Referee: Ondřej Pechanec |

| 20 August 2023 5 | České Budějovice | 3–0 | Bohemians 1905 | České Budějovice |
| 15:00 CEST (UTC+2) | Adediran 45+2'; Havel 58'; Osmančík 89' | Report | | Stadium: Stadion Střelecký ostrov Attendance: 3,756; Referee: Jan Petřík |

| 27 August 2023 6 | Bohemians 1905 | 2–1 | Hradec Králové | Prague |
| 15:00 CEST (UTC+2) | Kovařík 8', 74' | Report | Kučera 67' | Stadium: Ďolíček; Attendance: 4,579; Referee: Tomáš Batík |

| 3 September 2023 7 | Viktoria Plzeň | 2–0 | Bohemians 1905 | Plzeň |
| 15:00 CEST (UTC+2) | Durosinmi 9'; Cadu 45' | Report | | Stadium: Doosan Arena; Attendance: 9,156; Referee: Jan Všetečka |

| 16 September 2023 8 | Bohemians 1905 | 1–1 | Baník Ostrava | Prague |
| 15:00 CEST (UTC+2) | Křapka 80' | Report | Šín 87' | Stadium: Ďolíček; Attendance: 6,079; Referee: Karel Rouček |

| 23 September 2023 9 | Bohemians 1905 | 3–2 | Sigma Olomouc | Prague |
| 18:00 CEST (UTC+2) | Prekop 36'; Puškáč 70'; Matoušek 77' | Report | Zorvan 8'; Vodháněl 44' | Stadium: Ďolíček; Attendance: 5,212; Referee: Ondřej Pechanec |

| 1 October 2023 10 | Mladá Boleslav | 2–1 | Bohemians 1905 | Mladá Boleslav |
| 15:00 CEST (UTC+2) | Helal 29'; Pulkrab 84' | Report | Matoušek 60' | Stadium: Lokotrans Aréna; Attendance: 3,331; Referee: Petr Hocek |

| 10 October 2023 11 | Bohemians 1905 | 0–0 | Zlín | Prague |
| 15:00 CEST (UTC+2) | | Report | | Stadium: Ďolíček; Attendance: 5,412; Referee: Dalibor Černý |

| 22 October 2023 12 | Jablonec | 0–1 | Bohemians 1905 | Jablonec nad Nisou |
| 18:00 CEST (UTC+2) | | Report | Prekop 25' | Stadium: Stadion Střelnice; Attendance: 2,613; Referee: Jan Všetečka |

| 29 October 2023 13 | Bohemians 1905 | 0–2 | Slavia Prague | Prague |
| 18:00 CET (UTC+1) | | Report | Tomič 20'; Chytil 67' | Stadium: Ďolíček; Attendance: 6,212; Referee: Karel Rouček |

| 4 November 2023 14 | Sparta Prague | 2–0 | Bohemians 1905 | Prague |
| 18:00 CET (UTC+1) | Birmančević 68' (pen.); Sadílek 81' | Report | | Stadium: epet ARENA; Attendance: 17,411; Referee: Marek Radina |

| 11 November 2023 15 | Bohemians 1905 | 1–0 | Karviná | Prague |
| 18:00 CET (UTC+1) | Prekop 52' | Report | | Stadium: Ďolíček; Attendance: 4,279; Referee: Jan Machálek |

| 25 November 2023 16 | Teplice | 1–1 | Bohemians 1905 | Teplice |
| 15:00 CET (UTC+1) | Chaloupek 20' | Report | Kozák 87' | Stadium: Na Stínadlech; Attendance: 2,639; Referee: Jan Petřík |

| 9 December 2023 18 | Slovácko | 5–2 | Bohemians 1905 | Uherské Hradiště |
| 15:00 CET (UTC+1) | Havlík 2', 53', 65', 77'; Daníček 34' (pen.) | Report | Hála 23'; Köstl 45+3' | Stadium: Městský fotbalový stadion Miroslava Valenty; Attendance: 3,379; Referee: Dominik Starý |

| 13 December 2023 17 | Bohemians 1905 | 0–0 | Slovan Liberec | Prague |
| 18:00 CET (UTC+1) | | Report | | Stadium: Ďolíček; Attendance: 2,579; Referee: Stanislav Volek |
Note: The match was originally scheduled for 5 December 2023, but was postponed due to snow.

| 16 December 2023 19 | Bohemians 1905 | 0–0 | České Budějovice | Prague |
| 18:00 CET (UTC+1) | | Report | | Stadium: Ďolíček; Attendance: 3,712; Referee: Petr Hocek |

| 11 February 2024 20 | Hradec Králové | 2–2 | Bohemians 1905 | Hradec Králové |
| 15:00 CEST (UTC+2) | Čihák 32'; Vašulín 74' | Report | Shejbal 80', 83' | Stadium: Malšovická aréna Attendance: 6,118; Referee: Marek Radina |

=== Czech Cup ===
| 11 October 2023 Third round | Sparta Kolín | 1–7 | Bohemians 1905 | Kolín |
| 15:30 CEST (UTC+2) | J. Neuberg 39' | Report | Kozák 7', 33', 81' (pen.); Mužík 52', 66', 85'; Hrubý 57' | Stadium: Městský stadion Attendance: 2,000; Referee: Michael Kvítek |

| 1 November 2023 Fourth round | Bohemians 1905 | 1–2 | Sparta Prague | Prague |
| 17:30 CET (UTC+1) | Kadlec 22' | Report | Sejk 52'; Ševčík 69' | Stadium: Ďolíček; Attendance: 5,012; Referee: Jan Petřík |

=== UEFA Europa Conference League ===
==== Second qualifying round ====
| 27 July 2023 First leg | Bodø/Glimt (Norway) | 3–0 | (Czech Republic) Bohemians 1905 | Bodø, Norway |
| 18:00 CEST (UTC+2) | Moe (yellow card) 39'; Grønbæk 44'; Pellegrino 50'; Berg (yellow card) 70'; Espejord 90+2' | Report | Hrubý (yellow card) 5'; Beran (yellow card) 70' | Stadium: Aspmyra Stadion; Attendance: 7,476; Referee: Arda Kardeşler (Turkey) |

| 3 August 2023 Second leg | Bohemians 1905 (Czech Republic) | 2–4 (2–7 agg.) | (Norway) Bodø/Glimt | Prague, Czech Republic |
| 19:05 CEST (UTC+2) | Matoušek 26'; Beran (yellow card) 40'; Hála (yellow card) 44'; Křapka 55'; Köstl (yellow card) 58'; Prekop (yellow card) 80' | Report | Sørli 22'; Moumbagna 42'; Grønbæk 78'; Berg (yellow card) 84'; Sørensen 87' | Stadium: Stadion Letná (Note: Bohemians played their home match at the Letná Stadion in Prague, instead of their regular stadium, the Ďolíček in Prague, which did not meet UEFA requirements.); Attendance: 12,089; Referee: Marcel Bîrsan (Romania) |
Note: Bodø/Glimt won 7-2 on aggregate.
