= 2024–25 Bohemians 1905 season =

Bohemians 1905
2024–25 season
- Stadium: Ďolíček
- Czech First League: 10th
- Czech Cup: Quarter-final
- Average home league attendance: 5,101
Home colours	Away colours

The 2024–25 season was the 120th season in the history of Bohemians 1905, and the 12th consecutive season in Czech First League, in which they finished 10th. In addition to the domestic league, the team participated in the Czech Cup, where they reached the quarter-final stage.

== Friendlies ==
=== Pre-season ===
4 July 2024 Friendly	Bohemians 1905 (Czech Republic)	4–1	(Hungary) Paksi FC	Šmarje pri Jelšah
17:30 UTC+2	Drchal 6'; Hrubý 11'; Ristovski 78'; Zeman 82'		Szabó 55'	Stadium: Stadion Šmarje pri Jelšah

7 July 2024 Friendly	FK Napredak (Serbia)	1–1	(Czech Republic) Bohemians 1905	Ptuj
17:30 UTC+2	Obradović 3'		Dostál 8'	Stadium: Mestni Štadion

10 July 2024 Friendly	Austria Wien	3–7	(Czech Republic) Bohemians 1905	Vienna, Austria
11:00 UTC+2	Fitz 21' (pen.); Fischer 22'; Malone 28'		Helal 2', 26', 52'; Ristovski 36'; Dostál 60'; Matoušek 63'; Wojnar 79' (o.g.)	Stadium: Generali Arena - Platz 2

14 July 2024 Friendly	Bohemians 1905 (Czech Republic)	4–0	(Slovakia) Trenčín
16:00 UTC+2

== Competitions ==
=== Czech First League ===
==== Regular season ====
Pos	Team	Pld	W	D	L	GF	GA	GD	Pts	Qualification or relegation
8	Karviná	30	11	8	11	40	52	−12	41	Qualification for the middle group
9	Hradec Králové	30	11	7	12	33	31	+2	40	Qualification for the middle group
10	Bohemians 1905	30	8	10	12	32	42	−10	34 (Note: Head to head points: Bohemians 1905 8, Mladá Boleslav 7, Teplice 1.)	Qualification for the middle group
11	Mladá Boleslav	30	9	7	14	40	40	0	34	Qualification for the relegation group
12	Teplice	30	9	7	14	32	42	−10	34	Qualification for the relegation group

Source: Chance Liga
Rules for classification: 1) Points; 2) Head-to-head points; 3) Head-to-head goal difference; 4) Head-to-head goals scored; 5) Goal difference; 6) Goals scored; 7) Fair-play ranking; 8) Draw.
Notes:

The match schedule was released on 20 June 2024.

Czech First League match details
Date	Opponent	Venue	Result F–A
20 July 2024	Baník Ostrava	H	2–1
27 July 2024	Dukla Praha	A	0–1
3 August 2024	1. FC Slovácko	A	0–0
10 August 2024	Sparta Prague	H	1–2
17 August 2024	MFK Karviná	A	2–1
24 August 2024	FK Jablonec	H	1–2
31 August 2024	Dynamo České Budějovice	A	0–0
22 September 2024	Slovan Liberec	A	2–2
29 September 2024	Slavia Praha	H	0–4
6 October 2024	Sigma Olomouc	A	3–1
20 October 2024	FK Mladá Boleslav	H	2–2
27 October 2024	FK Teplice	A	2–1
3 November 2024	FK Pardubice	H	0–0
10 November 2024	Viktoria Plzeň	A	0–2
24 November 2024	Dukla Praha	H	3–1
30 November 2024	1. FC Slovácko	H	3–3
4 December 2024	Hradec Králové	H	0–3
7 December 2024	Sparta Prague	A	0–1
14 December 2024	MFK Karviná	H	3–3
2 February 2025	FK Jablonec	A	1–0
9 February 2025	Dynamo České Budějovice	H	1–0
16 February 2025	Hradec Králové	A	2–2
23 February 2025	Slovan Liberec	H	0–0
2 March 2025	Slavia Praha	A	0–2
9 March 2025	Sigma Olomouc	H	0–1
15 March 2025	FK Mladá Boleslav	A	2–1
29 March 2025	FK Teplice	H	1–1
5 April 2025	FK Pardubice	A	0–2
13 April 2025	Viktoria Plzeň	H	1–2
19 April 2025	Baník Ostrava	A	0–1

==== Middle group ====
Czech First League middle group match details
Round	Date	Opponent	Venue	Result F–A
Semi-final (first leg)	4 May 2025	Slovan Liberec	H	4–1
Semi-final (second leg)	11 May 2025	Slovan Liberec	A	0–1
Final (first leg)	18 May 2025	Hradec Králové	H	1–0
Final (second leg)	25 May 2025	Hradec Králové	A	0–2

=== Czech Cup ===
Czech Cup match details
Round	Date	Opponent	Venue	Result F–A
Second round	25 September 2024	Sokol Brozany	A	3–1
Third round	30 October 2024	MFK Vyškov	A	1–0
Round of 16	26 February 2025	FK Mladá Boleslav	A	2–0
Quarter-final	10 April 2025	Viktoria Plzeň	H	1–3
