= Matuschek =

Matuschek is a surname. It is a Germanized spelling of the Czech surname Matoušek and Polish Matuszek. Ultimately, it stems from the male given name Matthew. Notable people with the name include:

- Hubert Matuschek (1902–1968), Austrian architect
- Oliver Matuschek, German author and scholar
