= Matuszek =

Matuszek is a Polish surname. A possible origin is the Polonization of the Czech surname Matoušek. Notable people with this surname include:

- Gabriela Matuszek (born 1953), Polish literary historian, essayist, critic and translator of German literature
- Len Matuszek (born 1954), American baseball player
- Marek Matuszek (born 1972), Slovak judoka
- Szymon Matuszek (born 1989), Polish footballer
