= Jiří Matoušek =

Jiří Matoušek is the name of:

- Jiří Matoušek (mathematician) (1963–2015), professor at Charles University, Prague
- Jiří Matoušek (basketball), member of the Czech basketball team at the 1952 Olympics
- Jiří Matoušek, chairman of the Organisation for the Prohibition of Chemical Weapons Scientific Advisory Board and professor of environmental chemistry and toxicology at Masaryk University, Brno
- Jiří Matoušek, hockey player for HC Litvínov in the 1993–1994 season

== See also ==
- Matoušek
