= Tony Le =

Czech footballer (born 1999)

Personal information
- Date of birth: 26 August 1999 (age 27)
- Place of birth: Benešov, Czech Republic
- Height: 1.82 m (6 ft 0 in)
- Position: Midfielder

Team information
- Current team: Pho Hien
- Number: 35

Youth career
- Benešov
- Bohemians 1905
- 2020: → Vlašim (loan)

Senior career*
Years	Team	Apps	(Gls)
- Bohemians 1905 B
2021	→ Binh Dinh (loan)	3	(0)
2022–	Pho Hien	0	(0)
- * Club domestic league appearances and goals

Tony Le (Vietnamese: Lê Tuấn Anh, born 26 August 1999) is a Czech footballer who plays as a midfielder for Pho Hien. He was born in Benešov to Vietnamese parents.

== Career ==
Tony Le started his career with Bohemians 1905 B in the Czech third division.

Before the second half of 2019/20, he was sent on loan to the youth academy of Czech second division side Vlašim.

Before the 2021 season, Tony Le was sent on loan to Binh Dinh in Vietnam.

== Honours ==
PVF-CAND

- V.League 2 runner-up: (silver) 2023
- Vietnamese National Cup third place : (bronze) 2023
