= Michael Ugwu (footballer) =

Nigerian footballer

Personal information
- Full name: Michael Junior Ugwu
- Date of birth: 10 January 1999 (age 27)
- Place of birth: Nigeria
- Position: Forward

Team information
- Current team: SK Benátky
- Number: 99

Senior career*
Years	Team	Apps	(Gls)
20xx–2019	Bendel Insurance		
2019–2022	Bohemians 1905	26	(0)
2019	→→ Bohemians 1905 B	33	(15)
2020–2021	→ Dukla Prague (loan)	7	(1)
2022–2023	Sellier & Bellot Vlašim	7	(0)
2023	FK Přepeře	14	(4)
2023–2024	SK Sokol Brozany	13	(3)
2024	TJ Spoje Praha		
2024–	Ústí nad Labem	11	(0)
- * Club domestic league appearances and goals

Michael Ugwu (born 10 January 1999) is a Nigerian footballer who plays for SK Benátky in the ČFL.

== Career ==
Ugwu started his senior career with Bendel Insurance. In 2019, he signed a three-year contract with Czech First League club Bohemians 1905, where he has made five appearances and scored two goals.

In 2022, Ugwu signed a one-year contract with Czech National Football League club Sellier & Bellot Vlašim.
