= Matoušek =

Matoušek (feminine Matoušková) is a Czech surname. Notable people with the surname include:

- Bohuslav Matoušek (born 1949) Czech violinist
- Gabriela Matoušková (born 1992), Czech footballer
- Iveta Matoušková (born 1987), Czech handballer
- Jan Matoušek (born 1998), Czech footballer
- Jan Matoušek (rower) (1915–?), Czech rower
- Jaroslav Matoušek (born 1951), Czech athlete
- Jiří Matoušek (disambiguation), multiple people
- Josef Matoušek (historian), Czech historian
- Josef Matoušek (athlete) (1928–2019), Czech athlete
- Karel Matoušek (1928–2018), Czech wrestler
- Kateřina Matoušková (born 1964), Czech-Canadian figure skater
- Matylda Matoušková-Šínová (born 1933), Czech gymnast
- Petr Matoušek (1949–2025), Czech cyclist
- Tomáš Matoušek (born 1992), Slovak ice hockey player
