= Vít Nemrava =

Czech footballer

Personal information
- Date of birth: January 9, 1996 (age 30)
- Place of birth: Czech Republic
- Position: Goalkeeper

Senior career*
Years	Team	Apps	(Gls)
2013–	1. FC Slovácko	6	(0)
2013–2014	→ West Ham United F.C.	0	(0)
2017–2018	→ MFK Vítkovice	1	(0)
2018	→ ČSK Uherský Brod	15	(0)
- * Club domestic league appearances and goals

Vít Nemrava (born 9 January 1996 in the Czech Republic) is a Czech footballer.

== Career ==
Nemrava started his career with Slovácko in the Czech top flight.

At the age of 17, he was sent on loan to English Premier League side West Ham United.

In 2017, he was sent on loan to MFK Vítkovice in the Czech second division.

For the second half of 2017/18, Nemrava was sent on loan to Czech third division club ČSK Uherský Brod, before returning to Slovácko.
