= Vladislav Levin =

Russian footballer

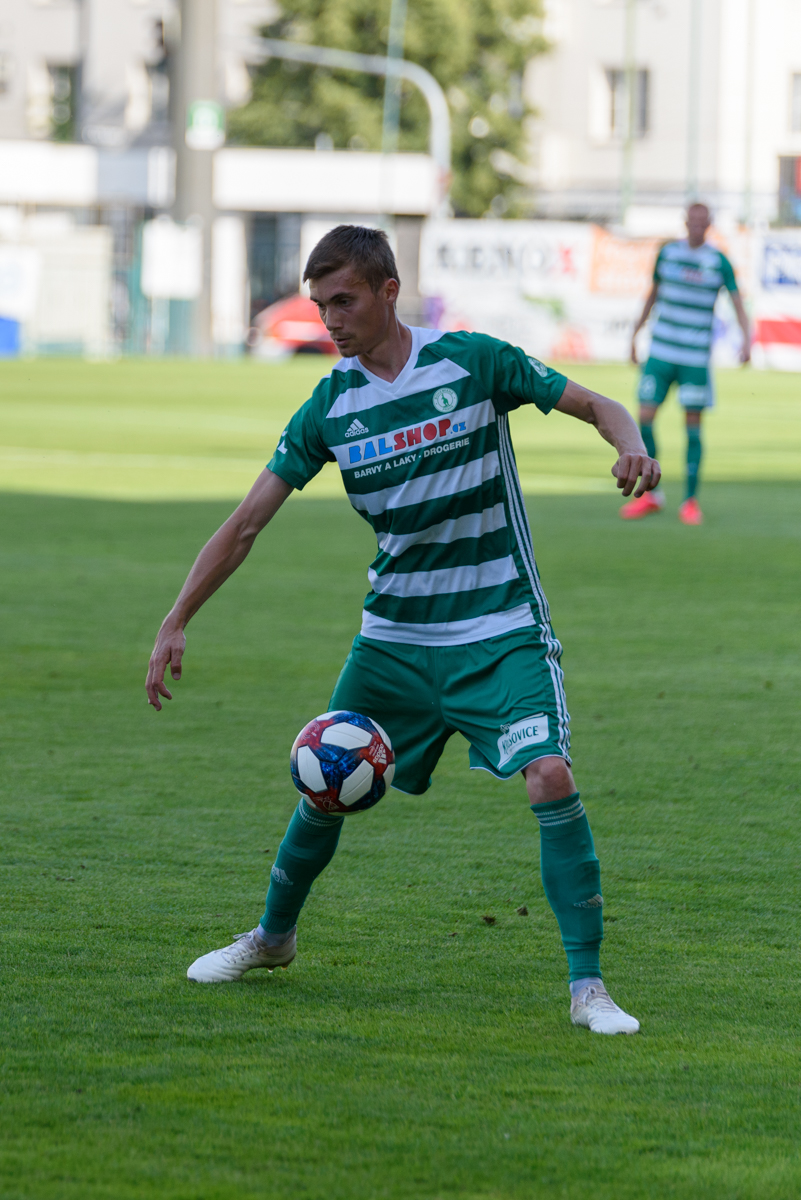

Personal information
- Full name: Vladislav Olegovich Levin
- Date of birth: 28 March 1995 (age 31)
- Place of birth: Oryol, Russia
- Height: 1.80 m (5 ft 11 in)
- Position: Central midfielder

Youth career
- Dynamo Moscow

Senior career*
| Years | Team | Apps | (Gls) |
| 2015–2016 | Dynamo Moscow | 5 | (0) |
| 2016 | → Dynamo-2 Moscow | 13 | (2) |
| 2017 | Mladá Boleslav | 12 | (1) |
| 2018–2019 | Vysočina Jihlava | 28 | (2) |
| 2019–2022 | Bohemians 1905 | 61 | (1) |
| 2022 | Slovácko | 23 | (0) |
| 2023–2024 | Arsenal Tula | 27 | (2) |
| 2024 | Sochi | 6 | (0) |
| 2024–2025 | Arsenal Tula | 18 | (0) |
| 2026 | Leningradets | 17 | (1) |
- * Club domestic league appearances and goals as of 13 June 2026

Vladislav Olegovich Levin (Russian: Владислав Олегович Лёвин; born 28 March 1995) is a Russian professional football player who plays as a central midfielder.

== Club career ==
He made his professional debut on 29 August 2015 for Dynamo Moscow in a Russian Premier League game against Ufa.

On 7 February 2017, he moved to the Czech Republic, signing with Mladá Boleslav.

== Personal life ==
His father Oleg Levin played football professionally for Oryol and other third-tier Russian Second League teams.

== Career statistics ==
As of 14 July 2024

| Club | Season | League | | | Cup | | Continental | | Other | | Total | |
| Club | Season | Division | Apps | Goals | Apps | Goals | Apps | Goals | Apps | Goals | Apps | Goals |
|---|---|---|---|---|---|---|---|---|---|---|---|---|
| Dynamo Moscow | 2014–15 | Russian Premier League | 0 | 0 | 0 | 0 | 0 | 0 | — | | 0 | 0 |
| Dynamo Moscow | 2015–16 | Russian Premier League | 3 | 0 | 1 | 0 | — | | — | | 4 | 0 |
| Dynamo Moscow | 2016–17 | Russian First League | 2 | 0 | 0 | 0 | — | | — | | 2 | 0 |
| Dynamo Moscow | Total | | 5 | 0 | 1 | 0 | 0 | 0 | 0 | 0 | 6 | 0 |
| Dynamo-2 Moscow | 2016–17 | Russian Second League | 13 | 2 | — | | — | | — | | 13 | 2 |
| Mladá Boleslav | 2016–17 | Czech First League | 8 | 1 | 1 | 0 | — | | — | | 9 | 1 |
| Mladá Boleslav | 2017–18 | Czech First League | 4 | 0 | 1 | 0 | 0 | 0 | — | | 5 | 0 |
| Mladá Boleslav | Total | | 12 | 1 | 2 | 0 | 0 | 0 | 0 | 0 | 14 | 1 |
| Vysočina Jihlava | 2017–18 | Czech First League | 13 | 0 | — | | — | | — | | 13 | 0 |
| Vysočina Jihlava | 2018–19 | Czech National Football League | 15 | 2 | 2 | 0 | — | | — | | 17 | 2 |
| Vysočina Jihlava | Total | | 28 | 2 | 2 | 0 | 0 | 0 | 0 | 0 | 30 | 2 |
| Bohemians 1905 | 2018–19 | Czech First League | 13 | 0 | 1 | 0 | — | | — | | 14 | 0 |
| Bohemians 1905 | 2019–20 | Czech First League | 5 | 0 | 0 | 0 | — | | 3 (Note: Appearances in the Czech First League Europa League play-offs) | 0 | 8 | 0 |
| Bohemians 1905 | 2020–21 | Czech First League | 27 | 1 | 2 | 1 | — | | — | | 29 | 2 |
| Bohemians 1905 | 2021–22 | Czech First League | 16 | 0 | 3 | 0 | — | | — | | 19 | 0 |
| Bohemians 1905 | Total | | 61 | 1 | 6 | 1 | 0 | 0 | 3 | 0 | 70 | 2 |
| Slovácko | 2021–22 | Czech First League | 14 | 0 | 2 | 0 | — | | — | | 16 | 0 |
| Slovácko | 2022–23 | Czech First League | 9 | 0 | 1 | 0 | 3 (Note: Two appearances in the UEFA Europa League, one appearance in the UEFA Europa Conference League) | 0 | — | | 13 | 0 |
| Slovácko | Total | | 23 | 0 | 3 | 0 | 3 | 0 | 0 | 0 | 29 | 0 |
| Slovácko B | 2022–23 | MSFL | 1 | 0 | — | | — | | — | | 1 | 0 |
| Arsenal Tula | 2023–24 | Russian First League | 27 | 2 | 0 | 0 | — | | 2 (Note: Appearances in the promotion play-offs) | 0 | 29 | 2 |
| Sochi | 2024–25 | Russian First League | 1 | 0 | 0 | 0 | — | | — | | 1 | 0 |
| Career total | | | 171 | 8 | 14 | 1 | 3 | 0 | 5 | 0 | 193 | 9 |
