= Roman Květ =

Czech footballer

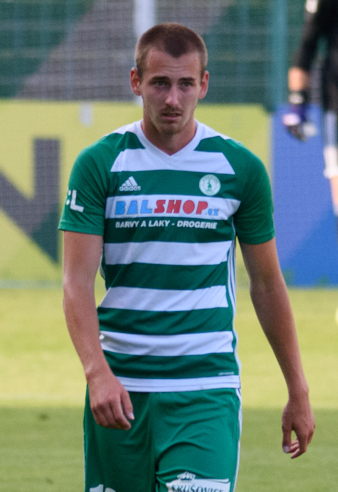

Personal information
- Full name: Roman Květ
- Date of birth: 17 December 1997 (age 28)
- Place of birth: Sedlčany, Czech Republic
- Height: 1.87 m (6 ft 2 in)
- Position: Midfielder

Team information
- Current team: Bohemians 1905

Youth career
- Příbram

Senior career*
Years	Team	Apps	(Gls)
2016–2020	Příbram	71	(6)
2020–2022	Bohemians	26	(1)
2022–2025	Viktoria Plzeň	16	(2)
2023–2024	→ Sivasspor (loan)	24	(1)
2024–2025	→ Dender (loan)	38	(7)
2025–2026	Dender	32	(5)
2026–	Bohemians 1905	0	(0)
- * Club domestic league appearances and goals as of 11 May 2026

Roman Květ (born 17 December 1997) is a Czech professional footballer who plays as a midfielder for Bohemians 1905. He had made eight appearances for 1. FK Příbram, totaling just over six-hundred minutes, and accumulating three red cards, before he moved to Bohemians in July 2020 after going on loan with them the previous season.

On 14 August 2023, Květ joined Turkish club Sivasspor on a one-year loan deal with option.

On 20 June 2024, Květ joined Belgian club Dender on a one-year loan deal with option.

On 22 May 2025, Květ signed a contract with Dender until 2027.

On 30 July 2026, Květ returned to Bohemians 1905, he signed a contract until June 2029.
