= Antonín Křapka =

Czech footballer

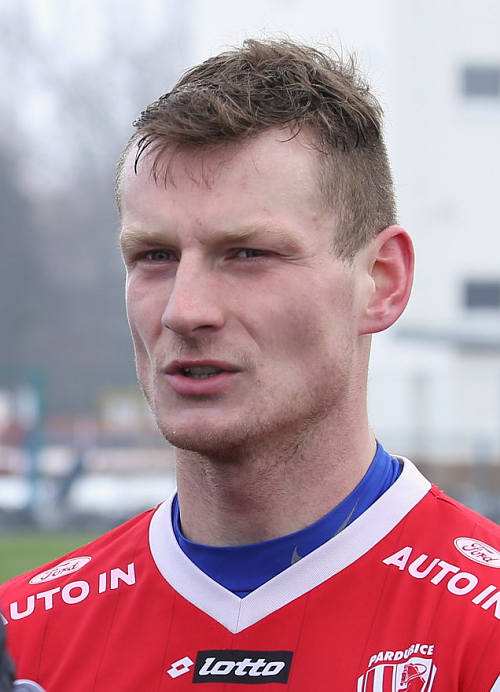

Personal information
- Date of birth: 22 January 1994 (age 32)
- Place of birth: Mladá Boleslav, Czech Republic
- Height: 1.83 m (6 ft 0 in)
- Position: Defender

Team information
- Current team: Zlín
- Number: 39

Youth career
- 2008–2014: Mladá Boleslav

Senior career*
| Years | Team | Apps | (Gls) |
| 2014–2021 | Mladá Boleslav | 80 | (2) |
| 2016 | → Ústí nad Labem (loan) | 10 | (0) |
| 2016 | → Bohemians 1905 (loan) | 1 | (0) |
| 2017 | → Pardubice (loan) | 23 | (1) |
| 2021 | MFK Karviná | 17 | (1) |
| 2022–2025 | Bohemians 1905 | 96 | (8) |
| 2025– | Zlín | 29 | (0) |

International career
| 2016 | Czech Republic U21 | 2 | (0) |
- * Club domestic league appearances and goals as of 27 May 2026

Antonín Křapka (born 22 January 1994) is a Czech professional footballer who plays as a defender for Zlín in Czech First League.

== Life ==
Antonín Křapka was born in a hospital in Mladá Boleslav, but he is native of Nemyslovice, where he started to play football in 2001.

== Club career ==
From 2008, he played for FK Mladá Boleslav. He made his league debut for the senior team on 25 April 2015 in Mladá Boleslav's surprising 2–1 Czech First League away win against FC Viktoria Plzeň. After playing Czech National Football League (2nd tier) for FK Ústí nad Labem and FK Pardubice on loan in 2016 and 2017, he returned to his home club in winter of 2018.

In 2021, he played for MFK Karviná. From 2022 to 2025, he played for Bohemians 1905.

On 3 June 2025, Křapka signed a two-year contract with FC Zlín.

== International career ==
He made two appearances for Czech Republic national under-21 football team in 2016.
