= Adam Jánoš =

Czech footballer

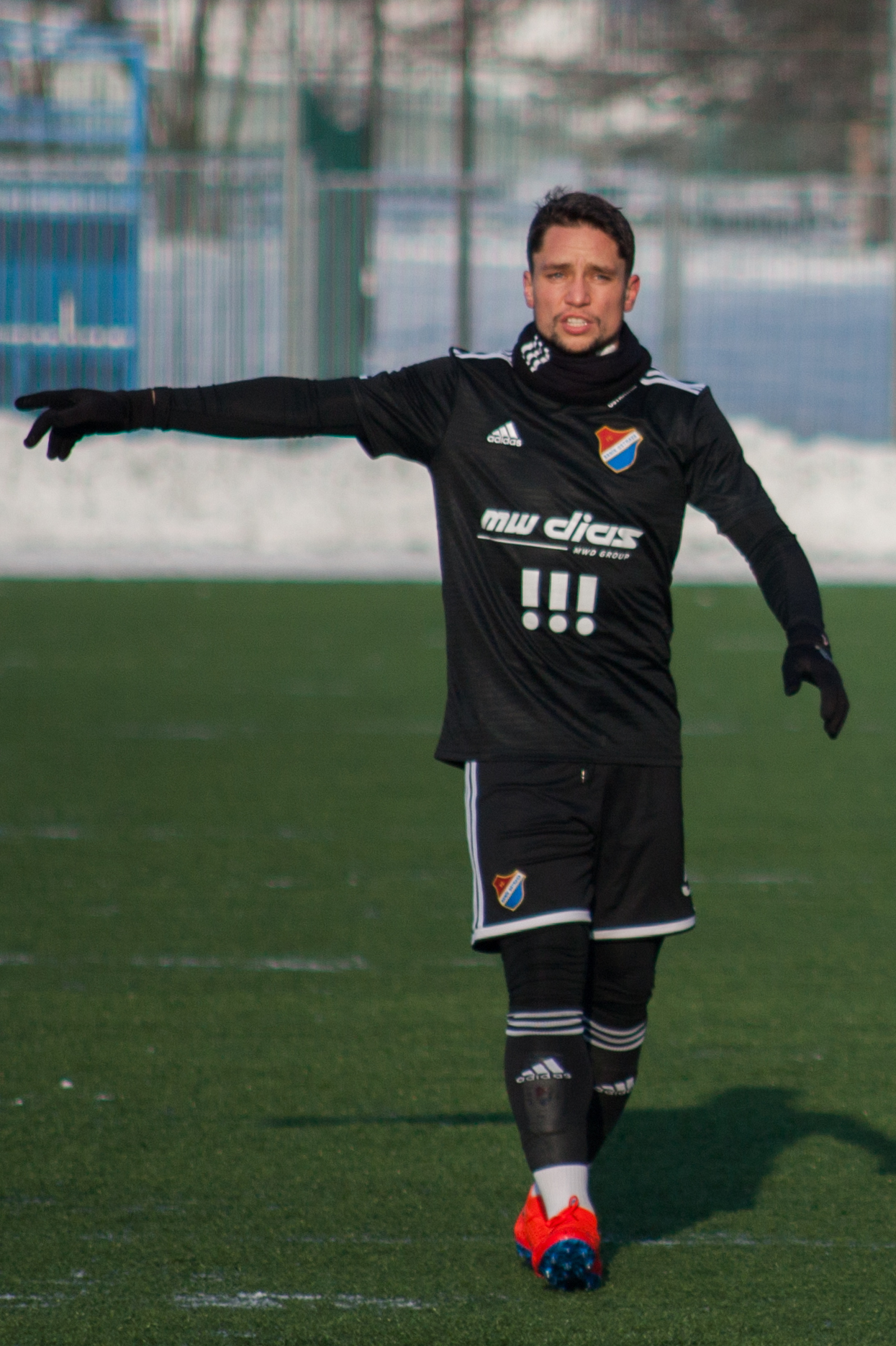
- Jánoš with FC Baník Ostrava

Personal information
- Date of birth: 20 July 1992 (age 34)
- Place of birth: Uherské Hradiště, Czechoslovakia
- Height: 1.72 m (5 ft 8 in)
- Position: Midfielder

Team information
- Current team: Neratovice-Byškovice
- Number: 5

Senior career*
Years	Team	Apps	(Gls)
2012–2015	Sparta Prague	1	(0)
2013–2015	→ Vysočina Jihlava (loan)	56	(3)
2016–2018	Mladá Boleslav	54	(2)
2018–2022	Baník Ostrava	90	(3)
2022	→ Karviná	4	(0)
2022–2024	Bohemians 1905	52	(3)
2025–	Neratovice-Byškovice		

International career
2007–2008	Czech Republic U16	6	(0)
2008–2009	Czech Republic U17	5	(0)
2009	Czech Republic U18	3	(0)
2010–2011	Czech Republic U19	14	(0)
2012–2015	Czech Republic U21	11	(0)
2020	Czech Republic	1	(0)
- * Club domestic league appearances and goals as of 4 January 2025

Adam Jánoš (born 20 July 1992) is a Czech football player who plays for Neratovice-Byškovice. He has represented his country at youth and senior international level. His father was Zdeněk Jánoš, also a professional footballer.

== Career statistics ==
=== International ===
As of 7 September 2020

Czech Republic
Year	Apps	Goals
2020	1	0
Total	1	0
