= Lukáš Hůlka =

Czech footballer (born 1995)

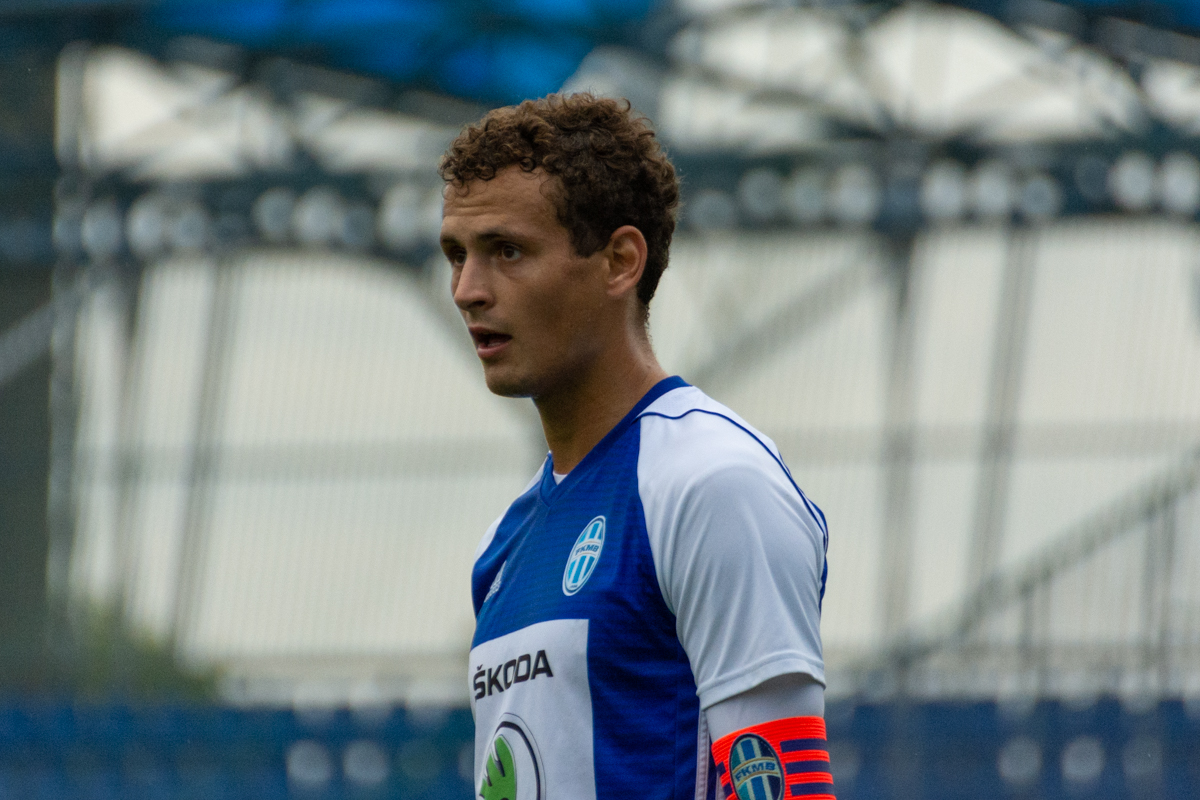
- Lukáš Hůlka in 2018

Personal information
- Date of birth: 31 March 1995 (age 31)
- Place of birth: Mladá Boleslav, Czech Republic
- Height: 1.82 m (6 ft 0 in)
- Position: Defender

Team information
- Current team: Slovan Liberec

Youth career
- 2005–2013: Mladá Boleslav

Senior career*
Years	Team	Apps	(Gls)
2013–2018	Mladá Boleslav	41	(3)
2017	→ Hradec Králové (loan)	10	(1)
2017–2018	→ Bohemians 1905 (loan)	26	(1)
2019–2026	Bohemians 1905	201	(17)
2026–	Slovan Liberec	0	(0)

International career
2011	Czech Republic U16	8	(0)
2011–2012	Czech Republic U17	16	(0)
2013	Czech Republic U18	10	(0)
2014	Czech Republic U19	2	(0)
2014–2016	Czech Republic U20	7	(0)
2016	Czech Republic U21	1	(0)
- * Club domestic league appearances and goals as of 28 May 2026

Lukáš Hůlka (born 31 March 1995) is a Czech professional footballer who plays as a defender for Slovan Liberec in the Czech First League.

== Club career ==
Hůlka started playing football in the junior categories of FK Mladá Boleslav, where he won two junior titles in 2013 and 2015. He made his debut for Mladá Boleslav in UEFA Europa League qualifying match against NK Široki Brijeg in July 2014.

He made his league debut on 13 September 2015 in Mladá Boleslav's 1–0 away loss against FC Baník Ostrava. He plays his entire career in the Czech First League. After a loan spell at Bohemians 1905 in the 2017–18 season, he transferred to that club in 2019. Since then, he has become a regular in the starting line-up. He played form Bohemians until the end of the 2025–26 season, when he transferred to Slovan Liberec. He played 227 games for Bohemians (4th most in club's Czech First League at the time he left the club) and scored 18 goals (5th most).

== International career ==
Hůlka went through all the youth national teams. He made one appearance for Czech Republic national under-21 football team in 2016.
