= David Bartek =

Czech football midfielder

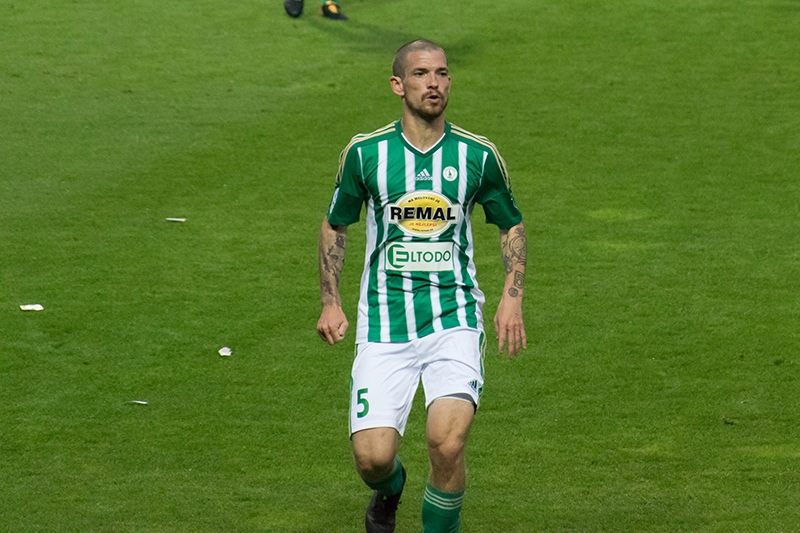

Personal information
- Date of birth: 13 February 1988 (age 38)
- Place of birth: Prague, Czechoslovakia
- Position: Midfielder

Team information
- Current team: Bohemians 1905 (assistant)

Youth career
- 1993–2006: Bohemians 1905

Senior career*
Years	Team	Apps	(Gls)
2006–2022	Bohemians 1905	337	(30)
2009	→ SK Kladno (loan)	12	(1)

Managerial career
- 2023–: Bohemians 1905 (assistant)
- * Club domestic league appearances and goals

David Bartek (born 13 February 1988) is a retired Czech football midfielder who played for most of his career for Bohemians 1905.
