= Petr Hronek =

Czech footballer

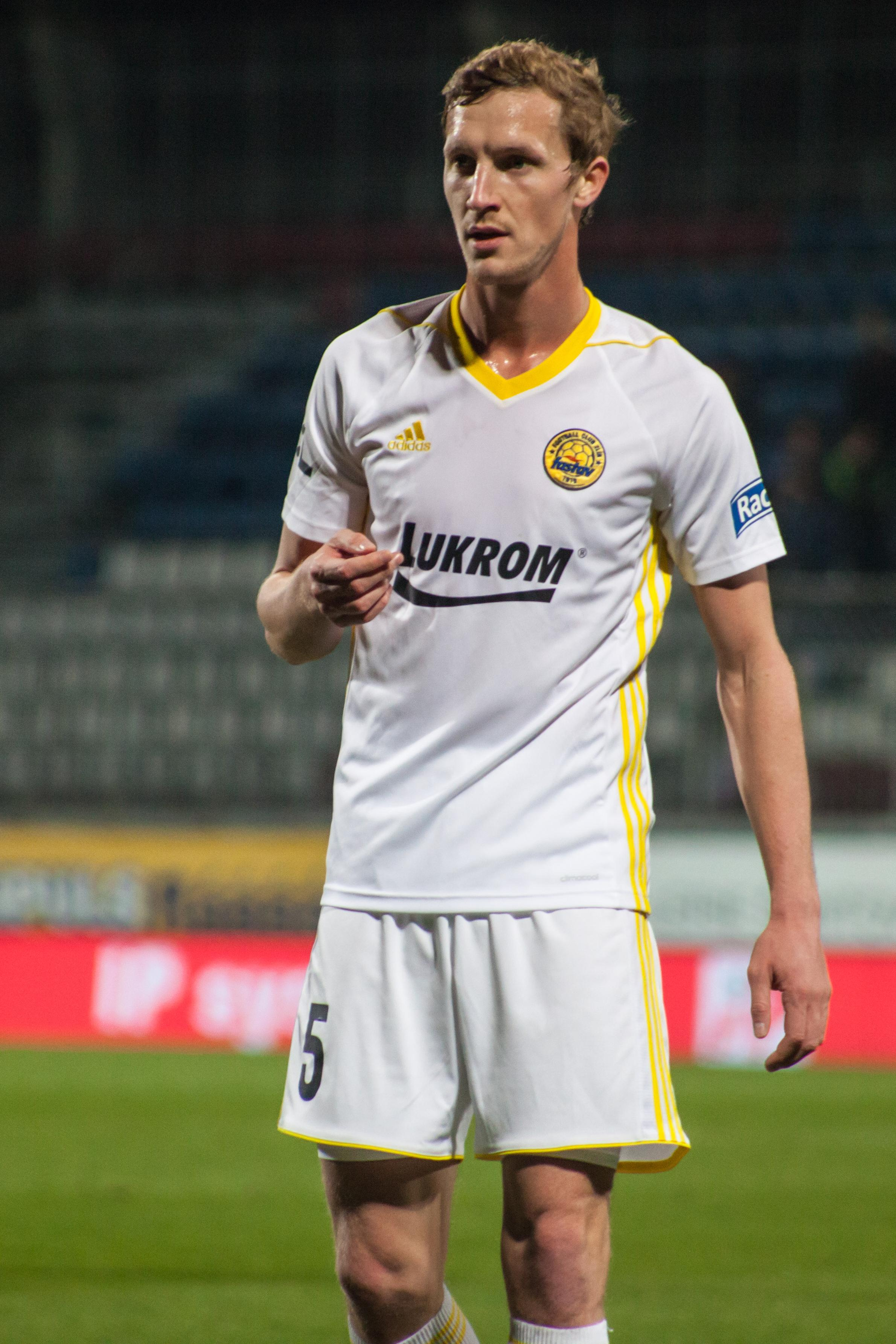

Personal information
- Date of birth: 4 July 1993 (age 33)
- Place of birth: Czech Republic
- Height: 1.82 m (6 ft 0 in)
- Position: Midfielder

Senior career*
| Years | Team | Apps | (Gls) |
| 2013 | Sparta Prague | 0 | (0) |
| 2013–2015 | Jablonec | 1 | (0) |
| 2014–2015 | → Vlašim (loan) | 29 | (5) |
| 2015 | → Příbram (loan) | 1 | (0) |
| 2015 | Vlašim | 15 | (4) |
| 2016–2017 | Jihlava | 42 | (10) |
| 2017–2020 | Zlín | 36 | (3) |
| 2019–2020 | → Bohemians 1905 (loan) | 22 | (5) |
| 2019 | → Bohemians 1905 B | 1 | (1) |
| 2020–2022 | Bohemians 1905 | 80 | (13) |
| 2022–2024 | Slavia Prague | 6 | (0) |
| 2023–2024 | → Teplice (loan) | 15 | (0) |
- * Club domestic league appearances and goals as of 2 July 2024

Petr Hronek (born 4 July 1993) is a Czech footballer who plays as a midfielder.

== Club career ==
=== Youth level ===
On youth level he played for AC Sparta Prague.

=== FK Jablonec ===
On 1 January 2013 he moved to FK Jablonec in the Czech First League. He made his debut for the first team on 12 August 2013 in first league match against FC Baník Ostrava.

It was the only match he played for FK Jablonec on senior level.

=== FC Sellier and Bellot Vlašim (loan) ===
On 21 January 2014 he was loaned to FC Sellier & Bellot Vlašim in Czech National Football League. In one year long loan he played in 29 league matches (scoring 5 goals) and in 1 Czech Cup match without scoring a goal.

=== 1. FK Příbram (loan) ===
On 1 February 2015 he was loaned to Příbram in the Czech First League. In five months long loan he played just in 1 league match without scoring a goal.

=== FC Sellier and Bellot Vlašim ===
On 2 July 2015 he moved back to FC Sellier & Bellot Vlašim on permanent basis. He played in 15 league matches (scoring 4 goals) and in 2 Czech Cup matches (without scoring a goal).

=== FC Vysočina Jihlava ===
On 1 January 2016 he moved to FC Vysočina Jihlava in the Czech First League. He played in 42 league matches (scoring 10 goals) and in 4 Czech Cup matches (without scoring a goal).

=== FC Fastav Zlín ===
On 31 August 2017 he moved to Fastav Zlín in the Czech First League. He played in 36 league matches (scoring 3 goals) and in 6 Czech Cup matches (without scoring a goal). He also played in one 2017-18 UEFA Europa League group stage match against FC Lokomotiv Moscow (without scoring a goal).

=== Bohemians Prague 1905 (loan) ===
On 1 July 2019 he was loaned to Bohemians 1905. In one year long loan he played in 22 league matches (scoring 5 goals) and in one Czech Cup match (without scoring a goal). He also played in one match (scoring one goal) for the reserve team in Bohemian Football League.

=== Bohemians Prague 1905 ===
On 1 July 2020 he moved to Bohemians 1905 on permanent basis. Since then he played in 15 league matches (scoring 3 goals) and in one Czech Cup match without scoring a goal (actual to 21 January 2021).

=== Slavia Prague ===
On 9 December 2022 he moved to SK Slavia Prague.
