= David Puškáč =

Czech footballer (born 1993)

Personal information
- Date of birth: 14 May 1993 (age 33)
- Place of birth: Karviná, Czech Republic
- Height: 1.90 m (6 ft 3 in)
- Position: Forward

Team information
- Current team: Slovácko

Youth career
- 2002–2011: Karviná
- 2010–2011: → Sigma Olomouc (loan)

Senior career*
Years	Team	Apps	(Gls)
2011–2016	Karviná	8	(0)
2016	Odra Petřkovice	15	(8)
2017–2018	Opava	51	(16)
2019–2024	Bohemians 1905	123	(25)
2024– 2026	Jablonec	65	(6)
2026–	Slovácko	0	(0)
- * Club domestic league appearances and goals as of 27 May 2026

David Puškáč (born 14 May 1993) is a Czech professional footballer who plays as a forward for Slovácko.

== Biography ==
Puškáč was born on 14 May 1993 in Karviná.

== Club career ==
Puškáč played for the youth teams of Karviná and Sigma Olomouc. He debuted in the Czech National Football League at the age of 16, when he played eight minutes in a match against SFC Opava. Due to injury, he did not make it in the Karviná A-team, so for several years he was only on loan in various teams in amateur competitions and made a living as a storekeeper and waiter. After a successful half-year engagement in the third league team Odra Petřkovice in the spring of 2016, he transferred to Opava. He scored 12 goals for Opava in the Czech National Football League and helped the team advance to the Czech First League.

He made his Czech First League debut on 21 July 2018, at the age of 25, in Opava's 2–0 away loss against Sparta Prague. In the middle of the 2018–19 season, he transferred to Bohemians 1905. He has played over 100 Czech First League matches for Bohemians and became the top scorer in the club's top league history with 25 goals.

On 26 June 2026, Puškáč signed a contract with Slovácko until 30 June 2028.
