= Josef Jindřišek =

Czech footballer

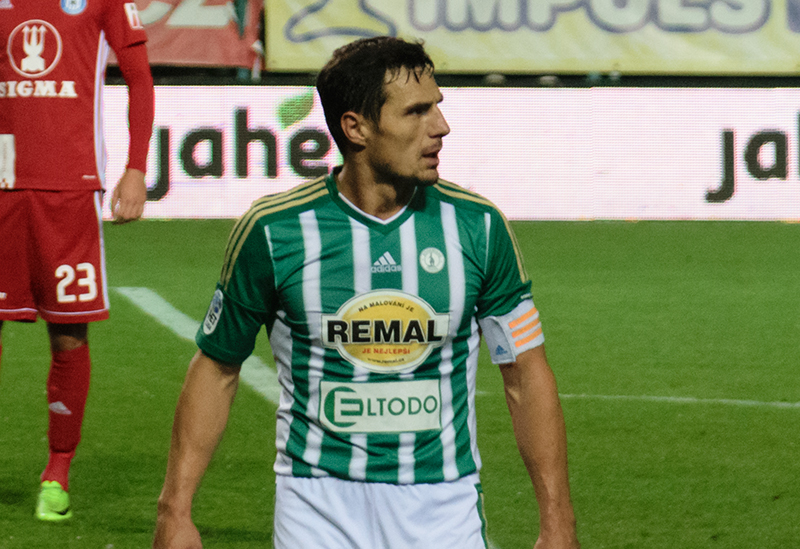
- Josef Jindřišek in 2017

Personal information
- Date of birth: 14 February 1981 (age 45)
- Place of birth: Plavy, Czechoslovakia
- Height: 1.78 m (5 ft 10 in)
- Position: Defensive midfielder

Youth career
- 1988–2003: Jablonec

Senior career*
Years	Team	Apps	(Gls)
2003–2006	Jablonec	55	(4)
2007–2008	Sigma Olomouc	36	(0)
2008	→ Fotbal Fulnek (loan)	15	(2)
2009	→ Bohemians 1905 (loan)	13	(0)
2009–2025	Bohemians 1905	387	(27)
- * Club domestic league appearances and goals

Josef Jindřišek (born 14 February 1981) is a Czech retired professional footballer who played as a defensive midfielder. He spent the vast majority of his career in Bohemians 1905. He is a significant personality of the Czech First League with 448 league caps (second highest number in Czech First League history). He is the oldest player to ever play in the Czech First League and its oldest scorer.

== Life and career ==
Josef Jindřišek was born 14 February 1981 in Plavy. He was born into a poor family and had six siblings.

He was raised in FK Jablonec. He debuted for Jablonec in the Czech First League in August 2003. He played for Jablonec until 2007, when he transferred to Sigma Olomouc. From 2009 until the end of his career, he played for the Prague club Bohemians 1905, including the time when the club was relegated to the Czech National Football League. In April 2025, Jindřišek announced his retirement. His last match took place on 4 May. He was nicknamed "Vršovice's Gattuso" (after the Vršovice district of Prague, where Bohemians 1905 resides, and Gennaro Gattuso, who played the same position as him).

== Records ==
Jindřišek's farewell match was his 448th league appearance, which at the time of the end of his career is the second highest number in Czech First League history. With 357 caps for Bohemians 1905, he also has the most caps in the Czech First League history of this club.

Jindřišek is the oldest player that appeared in the Czech First League. He obtained this record on 22 October 2023, when he started in the away match against Jablonec 0–1 at the age of 42 years, 8 months and 8 days. At the end of his career, he still held this record, and competed in his final match at the age of 44 years, 2 months and 20 days.

On 30 April 2023, Jindřišek's goal from penalty supported the 4–1 win against Jablonec, raising the record for the oldest scorer to 42 years, 2 months, 16 days of age. His record did not last long and was surpassed by Marek Matějovský, but Jindřišek scored a goal from penalty in his farewell match against Slovan Liberec, supporting the 4–1 win of Bohemians 1905. A goal at the age of 44 years, 2 months and 20 days is a record that is unique not only in the Czech Republic, bu in whole Europe. Given the end of Matějovský's career, it is certain that it will remain unbeaten for a long time.

== Honours ==
Individual

- Czech First League Personality of the Year: 2019–20, 2022–23
