= Roman Valeš =

Czech footballer

Personal information
- Date of birth: 6 March 1990 (age 36)
- Place of birth: Nymburk, Czechoslovakia
- Height: 1.90 m (6 ft 3 in)
- Position: Goalkeeper

Team information
- Current team: Bohemians 1905
- Number: 1

Youth career
- 1996–2005: Nový Bydžov
- 2005–2010: Slavia Prague

Senior career*
Years	Team	Apps	(Gls)
2009	→ Čáslav (loan)	8	(0)
2010	→ Hlučín (loan)	4	(0)
2010	Slavia Prague	0	(0)
2011–2019	Jablonec	54	(0)
2018–2019	→ Vysočina Jihlava (loan)	0	(0)
2019–	Bohemians 1905	64	(0)

International career
2005–2006	Czech Republic U16	5	(0)
2006–2007	Czech Republic U17	2	(0)
2007–2008	Czech Republic U18	5	(0)
2008–2009	Czech Republic U19	5	(0)
2010–2012	Czech Republic U21	3	(0)
- * Club domestic league appearances and goals as of 1 June 2024

Roman Valeš (born 6 March 1990 in Nymburk) is a Czech professional footballer who currently plays for Bohemians 1905 as a goalkeeper. He has represented his country at youth international level.
