= Robert Hrubý =

Czech footballer

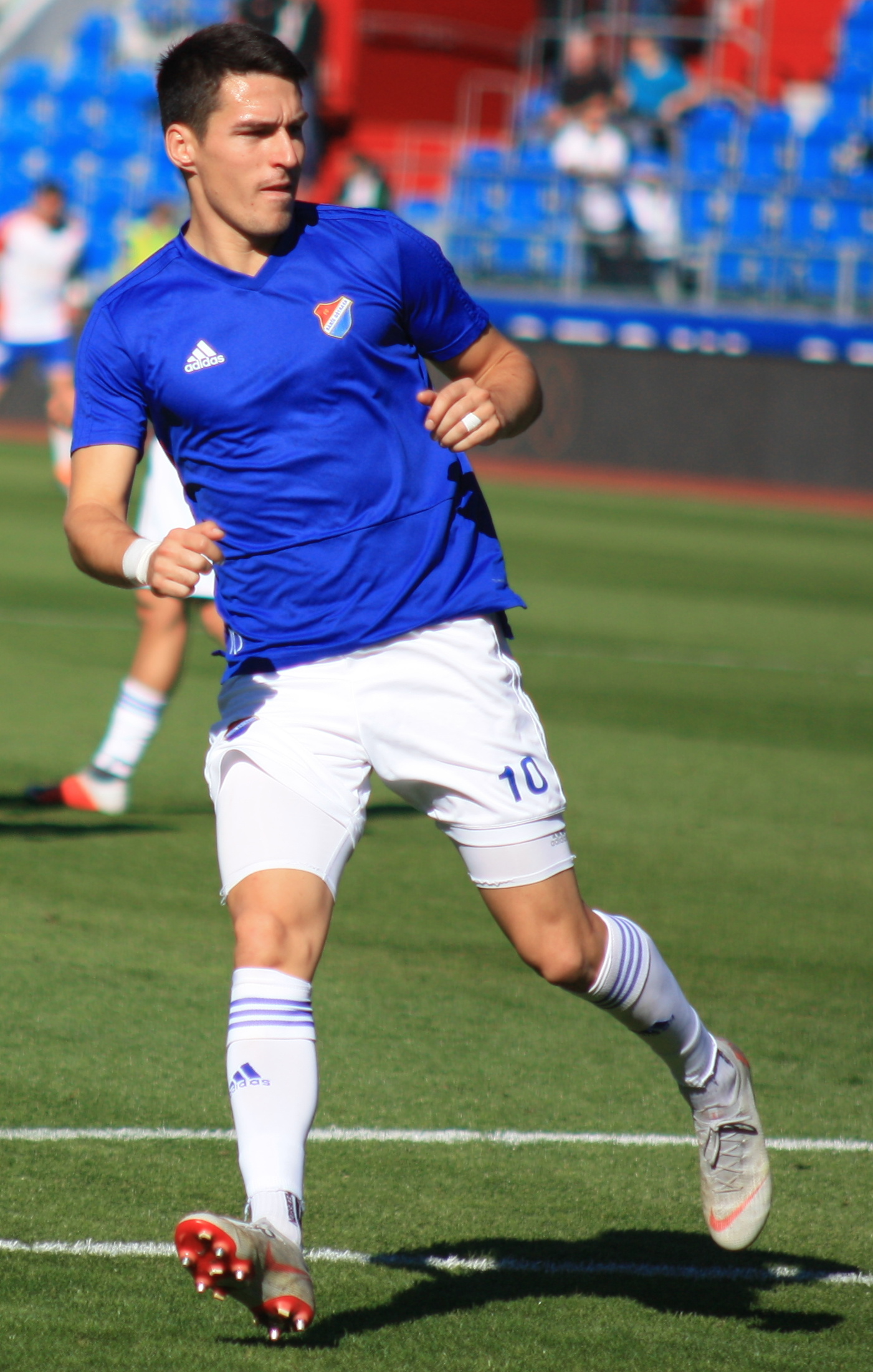

Personal information
- Date of birth: 27 April 1994 (age 32)
- Place of birth: Prague, Czech Republic
- Height: 1.84 m (6 ft 0 in)
- Position: Defensive midfielder

Team information
- Current team: Viktoria Žižkov

Youth career
- Slavia Prague

Senior career*
| Years | Team | Apps | (Gls) |
| 2014–2016 | Slavia Prague | 41 | (1) |
| 2016 | → Baník Ostrava (loan) | 12 | (4) |
| 2016 | → Teplice (loan) | 8 | (0) |
| 2017–2021 | Baník Ostrava | 87 | (8) |
| 2020–2021 | → Jablonec (loan) | 15 | (3) |
| 2021–2023 | Trinity Zlín | 58 | (7) |
| 2023–2026 | Bohemians 1905 | 76 | (1) |
| 2026– | Viktoria Žižkov | 0 | (0) |

International career^{‡}
| 2009–2010 | Czech Republic U16 | 6 | (0) |
| 2010–2011 | Czech Republic U17 | 6 | (1) |
| 2011 | Czech Republic U18 | 3 | (0) |
| 2014–2015 | Czech Republic U20 | 4 | (0) |
| 2014–2015 | Czech Republic U21 | 6 | (2) |
| 2017– | Czech Republic | 2 | (0) |
- * Club domestic league appearances and goals as of 15 May 2026 ‡ National team caps and goals as of 27 August 2018

Robert Hrubý (born 27 April 1994) is a Czech professional footballer who plays as a midfielder for Viktoria Žižkov in the Czech National Football League.

== Club career ==
He started his career in Slavia Prague. He made his league debut for Slavia Prague on 22 February 2014 in the 5–1 Czech First League away loss against Sigma Olomouc. After a series of loans, he moved to Baník Ostrava, then in the second tier of Czech football, in January 2017. He achieved promotion into the top flight with them in June 2017. On 19 June 2023 Hrubý joined Bohemians 1905, signing a three-year contract. On 23 June 2026, Hrubý signed a contract with Viktoria Žižkov.

== International career ==
He was first called up to the senior national team in October 2017 for friendly matches against Iceland and Qatar. He made his debut on 8 October against Iceland.
