= Jan Matoušek =

Czech footballer (born 1998)

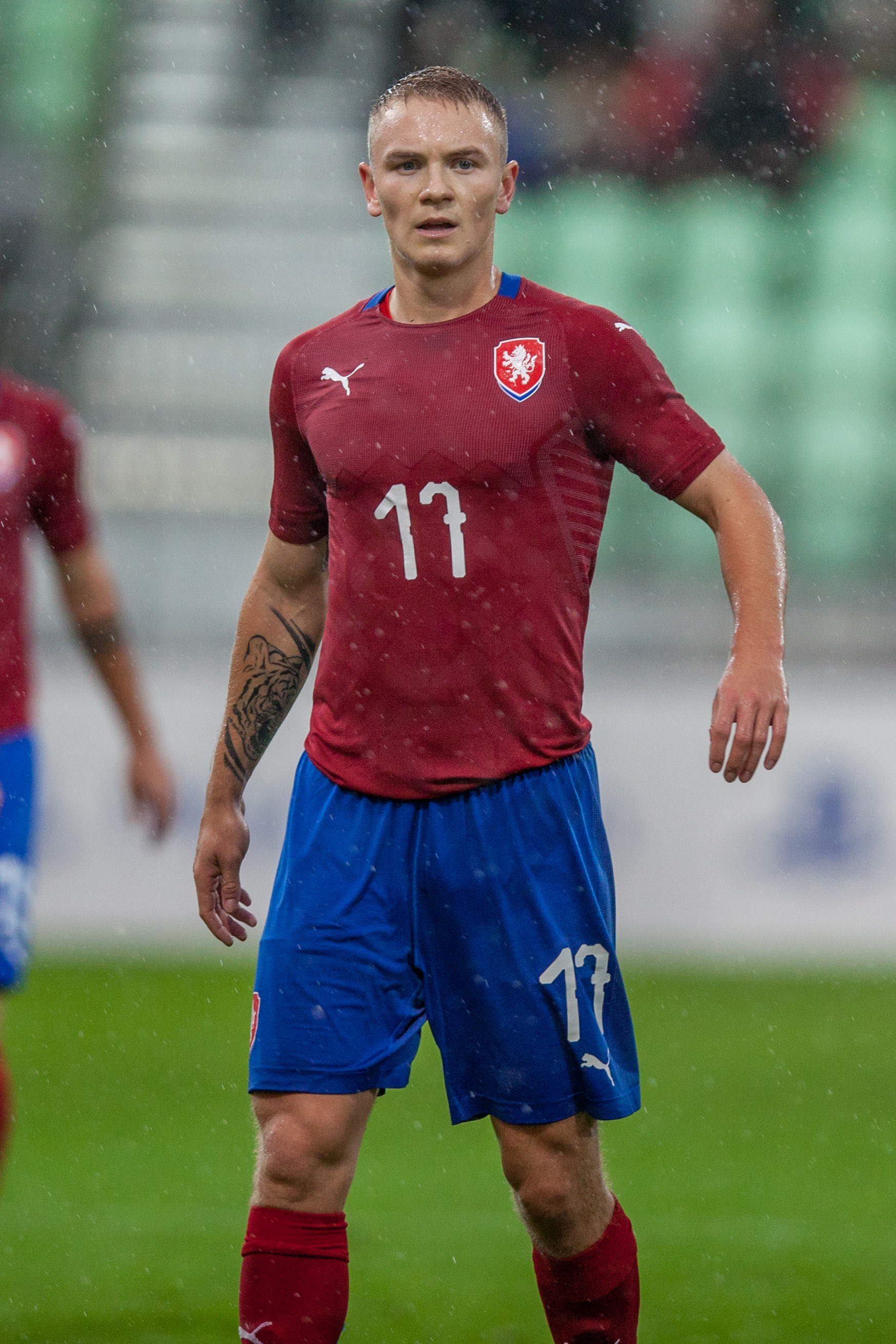

Personal information
- Date of birth: 9 May 1998 (age 28)
- Place of birth: Příbram, Czech Republic
- Height: 1.76 m (5 ft 9 in)
- Positions: Midfielder; forward

Team information
- Current team: Bohemians 1905
- Number: 10

Youth career
- Příbram

Senior career*
| Years | Team | Apps | (Gls) |
| 2017–2018 | Příbram | 27 | (13) |
| 2018–2023 | Slavia Prague | 7 | (0) |
| 2018–2019 | → Příbram (loan) | 22 | (11) |
| 2019–2020 | → Jablonec (loan) | 23 | (6) |
| 2020–2022 | → Slovan Liberec (loan) | 55 | (3) |
| 2022–2023 | → Bohemians 1905 (loan) | 15 | (6) |
| 2023– | Bohemians 1905 | 66 | (14) |

International career
| 2017 | Czech Republic U20 | 3 | (1) |
| 2018–2020 | Czech Republic U21 | 16 | (1) |
- * Club domestic league appearances and goals as of 27 May 2026

Jan Matoušek (born 9 May 1998) is a Czech professional footballer who plays as a midfielder or forward for Bohemians 1905 in the Czech First League.

== Club career ==
=== Příbram ===
Matousek made his league debut in Příbram's Czech National Football League 2–3 home loss against Vlašim on 12 August 2017. He scored his first league goals eleven days later in their 3–1 home victory against Varnsdorf. As the club's top goalscorer, Matousek promotion to the Czech First League with them and won the National League Best Player Award in his debut season.

In his second match in the top flight, Matousek scored two goals in Příbram's 4–2 home win against Bohemians Prague. Afterwards, he was signed by SK Slavia Prague for a transfer fee speculated to be around 40 million CZK (€1.6 million), the highest fee paid in a transfer between two Czech clubs. He stayed in Příbram on loan that was supposed to last until January 2019, but was recalled by Slavia due to an injury. As a replacement for Matoušek, Slavia sent Ruslan Mingazow on loan to Příbram.

=== Slavia Prague ===
Matoušek made his debut for Slavia in a 3–1 Czech First League win at Slovácko. He scored his first goal for the club on 25 October 2018 in their 1–0 UEFA Europa League group stage win at Copenhagen.

In February 2019, he returned to Příbram on loan until the end of the season.

== International career ==
In June 2023, Matousek debuted for the Czech senior squad during a UEFA Euro 2024 qualifying Group E match against Faroe Islands.

== Career statistics ==
=== Club ===
As of 7 March 2020

| Club | Season | League | | | Cup | | Continental | | Other | | Total | |
| Club | Season | Division | Apps | Goals | Apps | Goals | Apps | Goals | Apps | Goals | Apps | Goals |
|---|---|---|---|---|---|---|---|---|---|---|---|---|
| Příbram | 2017–18 | Fortuna národní liga | 24 | 11 | 2 | 0 | — | | — | | 26 | 11 |
| Příbram | 2018–19 | Fortuna liga | 7 | 4 | — | | — | | — | | 7 | 4 |
| Příbram | Total | | 31 | 15 | 2 | 0 | — | | — | | 33 | 15 |
| Slavia Prague | 2018–19 | Fortuna liga | 7 | 0 | 2 | 0 | 4 | 1 | — | | 13 | 1 |
| Příbram (loan) | 2018–19 | Fortuna liga | 15 | 7 | — | | — | | — | | 15 | 7 |
| Jablonec (loan) | 2019–20 | Fortuna liga | 14 | 6 | 2 | 0 | 2 | 0 | — | | 18 | 6 |
| Career total | | | 67 | 28 | 6 | 0 | 6 | 1 | 0 | 0 | 79 | 29 |
