= Martin Dostál =

Czech footballer (born 1989)

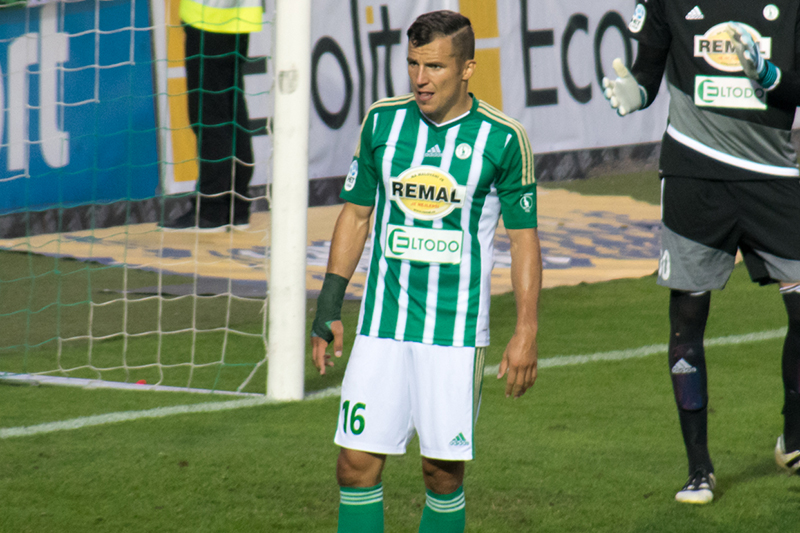

Personal information
- Date of birth: 23 September 1989 (age 37)
- Place of birth: Prague, Czechoslovakia
- Height: 1.75 m (5 ft 9 in)
- Position: Defender

Youth career
- Slavia Prague

Senior career*
Years	Team	Apps	(Gls)
2010–2016	Slavia Prague	62	(0)
2010	→ Čelákovice (loan)		
2015–2016	→ Baník Ostrava (loan)	19	(1)
2016–2025	Bohemians 1905	241	(8)
2019	→ Bohemians 1905 B	5	(0)
- * Club domestic league appearances and goals as of 17 June 2025

Martin Dostál (born 23 September 1989) is a Czech former football player who last played for Bohemians 1905.

== Club career ==
He made his first league debut for Slavia against Brno on 25 February 2011.

== Junior representation ==
In the years 2006 and 2007 he played 11 matches for the Czech U18 national team.
