= Ďolíček =

Stadium in the Czech Republic

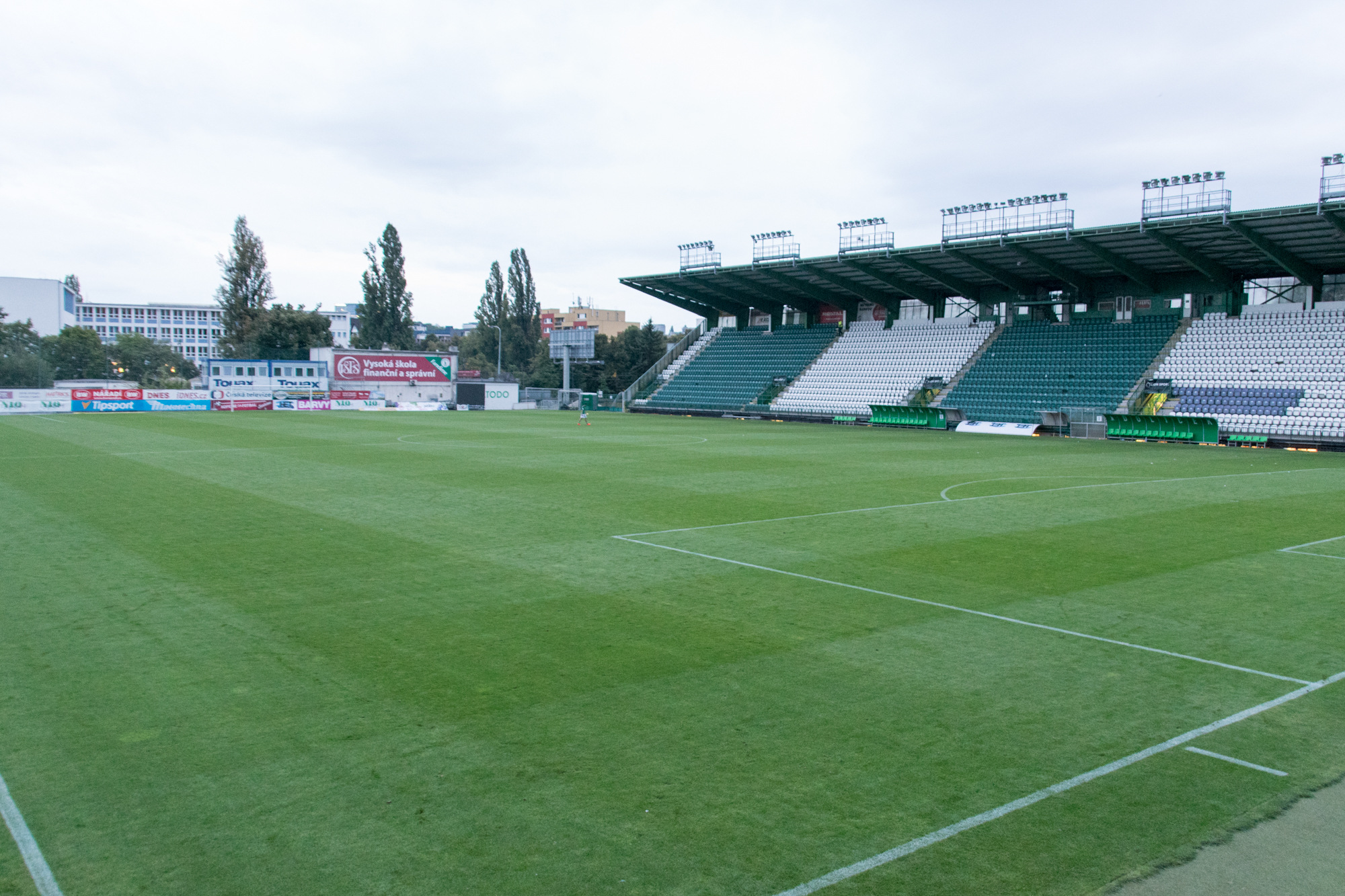
- Interactive map of Ďolíček
- Full name: Městský stadion Ďolíček
- Former names: Dannerův stadion (1932–1948)
- Location: Vršovická 1489/31, Vršovice; Prague, Czech Republic, 101 00
- Coordinates: 50°04′01″N 14°27′15″E
- Owner: municipality of Prague
- Operator: Bohemians Praha 1905
- Capacity: 6,300
- Surface: Grass
- Record attendance: 18,000; Bohemians Praha 1905 1-3 SK Slavia Praha, March 27, 1932
- Field size: 105m x 68m
- Public transit: Bohemians (6, 7, 24), Vršovické náměstí (4, 22); A at Strašnická

Construction
- Groundbreaking: 1930
- Built: 1930–1932
- Opened: March 27, 1932
- Renovated: 1971, 2003, 2007
- Rebuilt: 2025–2029 (estimated)

Tenants
- Bohemians Praha 1905 (1932–2010, 2012– FK Pardubice (2020–2023)

Website
- www.bohemians.cz

Ďolíček Stadium is a football stadium in the Prague district of Vršovice, Czech Republic. It is the home ground of Bohemians Praha 1905. The stadium was opened on 27 March 1932 for a match against SK Slavia Prague.

The reconstruction of 2003 changed the capacity to 13,388 (3,028 seated). After reconstruction in summer 2007, its capacity was reduced to 9,000 (3,800 seated). Bohemians 1905 were not allowed to keep the stand sector, they changed it into seats, which reduced the capacity further, to 7,500 (all seated).

In the 2010–11 and 2011–12 seasons, Bohemians played its home matches at Synot Tip Arena, and Ďolíček was only used for the Bohemians 1905 "B" team. After intense fan backlash, the team moved back.

In 2011, councillors of the city district of Prague 10 approved a proposal to purchase the stadium.

Beginning in 2025, the stadium is being completely rebuilt. The new ground, inspired by Boca Juniors' La Bombonera, is set to be completed around 2028 at the cost of 350 million CZK, all paid by the club and its fans via a crowd-funding effort. The construction is being carried out in small phases, so that Bohemians could continue playing at the stadium even while the work is ongoing.

Following completion, the capacity of the stadium is expected to be upwards of 8,500, all seated.

== Transport ==
The stadium is served by trams, the local stop immediately south of Ďolíček, formerly known as Oblouková, was renamed Bohemians in September 2012. Services 6, 7 and 24 serve the stop. Another stop, Vršovické náměstí, north of the site, is served by tram services 4 and 22. The Praha-Vršovice railway station is around ten minutes' walk from the stadium.
