= 2006 Russian Premier League =

15th season of top-tier football league in Russia

Russian Premier League
- Season: 2006
- Champions: CSKA Moscow
- Relegated: Torpedo Moscow; Shinnik Yaroslavl
- Champions League: CSKA Moscow; Spartak Moscow
- UEFA Cup: Lokomotiv Moscow; Zenit St.Petersburg
- Intertoto Cup: Rubin Kazan
- Matches: 240
- Goals: 585 (2.44 per match)
- Top goalscorer: Roman Pavlyuchenko (18)

The 2006 Russian Premier League was the 15th season of the premier football competition in Russia since the dissolution of the Soviet Union and the 5th under the current Russian Premier League name.

The season started on 17 March 2006 and ended on 26 November 2006. Defending champions CSKA Moscow claimed their second successive title on 18 November 2006 with an away win over Luch-Energiya Vladivostok. Spartak Moscow finished runners-up, level on points with CSKA but ranked behind due to fewer wins (see Tie-breaking criteria below). Lokomotiv Moscow finished third.

Torpedo Moscow and Shinnik were relegated. It was the first time in Torpedo Moscow's history that the club was relegated.

== Teams ==
As in the previous season, 16 teams played in the 2006 season. After the 2005 season, Alania Vladikavkaz and Terek Grozny were relegated to the 2006 Russian First Division. They were replaced by Luch-Energia Vladivostok and Spartak Nalchik, the winners and runners up of the 2005 Russian First Division.

=== Venues ===
Amkar	CSKA	Dynamo	Krylia
Zvezda Stadium	Central Stadium	Central Stadium	Metallurg Stadium
Capacity: 17,000	Capacity: 36,540	Capacity: 36,540	Capacity: 27,084
Lokomotiv	Locations of teams in 2006 Russian Premier League Locations of teams in 2006 Russian Premier League, Tomsk & Vladivostok		Luch-Energia
RZD Arena	Locations of teams in 2006 Russian Premier League Locations of teams in 2006 Russian Premier League, Tomsk & Vladivostok		Dynamo Stadium
Capacity: 33,001	Locations of teams in 2006 Russian Premier League Locations of teams in 2006 Russian Premier League, Tomsk & Vladivostok		Capacity: 10,200
Moscow	Locations of teams in 2006 Russian Premier League Locations of teams in 2006 Russian Premier League, Tomsk & Vladivostok		Rostov
Eduard Streltsov Stadium	Locations of teams in 2006 Russian Premier League Locations of teams in 2006 Russian Premier League, Tomsk & Vladivostok		Olimp-2
Capacity: 13,450	Locations of teams in 2006 Russian Premier League Locations of teams in 2006 Russian Premier League, Tomsk & Vladivostok		Capacity: 15,840
Rubin	Locations of teams in 2006 Russian Premier League Locations of teams in 2006 Russian Premier League, Tomsk & Vladivostok		Saturn
Central Stadium	Locations of teams in 2006 Russian Premier League Locations of teams in 2006 Russian Premier League, Tomsk & Vladivostok		Saturn Stadium
Capacity: 22,500	Locations of teams in 2006 Russian Premier League Locations of teams in 2006 Russian Premier League, Tomsk & Vladivostok		Capacity: 14,685
Shinnik	Locations of teams in 2006 Russian Premier League Locations of teams in 2006 Russian Premier League, Tomsk & Vladivostok		Spartak Moscow
Shinnik Stadium	Locations of teams in 2006 Russian Premier League Locations of teams in 2006 Russian Premier League, Tomsk & Vladivostok		Luzhniki Stadium
Capacity: 22,871	Locations of teams in 2006 Russian Premier League Locations of teams in 2006 Russian Premier League, Tomsk & Vladivostok		Capacity: 81,029
Spartak Nalchik	Tom	Torpedo	Zenit Saint Petersburg
Spartak Stadium	Trud Stadium	Luzhniki Stadium	Petrovsky Stadium
Capacity: 14,149	Capacity: 10,028	Capacity: 81,029	Capacity: 21,570

=== Personnel and kits ===
Team	Location	Head coach	Captain	Kit manufacturer	Shirt sponsor
Amkar Perm	Perm	(Tajikistan) Rashid Rakhimov		Adidas	
CSKA	Moscow	(Russia) Valery Gazzaev		Umbro	Sibneft/VTB
Dynamo	Moscow	(Russia) Andrey Kobelev		Umbro	Xerox
Lokomotiv	Moscow	(Russia) Oleg Dolmatov		Adidas	
Luch-Energia	Vladivostok	(Russia) Sergei Pavlov		Nike	DSV
Krylia	Samara	(Russia) Gadzhi Gadzhiyev			
Moscow	Moscow	(Russia) Leonid Slutsky			
Rostov	Rostov-on-Don	(Russia) Sergei Balakhnin		Umbro	
Rubin	Kazan	(Turkmenistan) Kurban Berdyev		Nike	—N/a
Saturn	Ramenskoye	(Slovakia) Vladimír Weiss		Adidas	
Shinnik	Yaroslavl	(Russia) Boris Gavrilov (Caretaker)			
Spartak	Moscow	(Russia) Vladimir Fedotov		Nike	
Spartak	Nalchik	(Russia) Yuri Krasnozhan		Umbro	—N/a
Tom	Tomsk	(Russia) Valery Petrakov			
Torpedo	Moscow	(Russia) Aleksandr Gostenin (Caretaker)		Umbro	—N/a
Zenit	Saint Petersburg	(Netherlands) Dick Advocaat		Adidas	Gazprom

=== Managerial changes ===
Team	Outgoing manager	Manner of departure	Date of vacancy	Position in table	Replaced by	Date of appointment	Position in table
Dynamo	(Russia) Andrey Kobelev (Caretaker)	End of role		Preseason	(Russia) Yuri Semin	22 November 2005	Preseason
Lokomotiv	(Russia) Vladimir Eshtrekov			Preseason	(Serbia) Slavoljub Muslin	12 December 2005	Preseason
Saturn	(Russia) Vladimir Shevchuk			Preseason	(Slovakia) Vladimír Weiss		Preseason
Tom	(Ukraine) Anatoliy Byshovets			Preseason	(Russia) Valery Petrakov		Preseason
Spartak	(Latvia) Aleksandrs Starkovs		April 2006		(Russia) Vladimir Fedotov	April 2006	
Zenit St.Petersburg	(Czech Republic) Vlastimil Petržela		4 May 2006		(Czech Republic) Vladimír Borovička (Caretaker)	May 2006	
Zenit St.Petersburg	(Czech Republic) Vladimír Borovička (Caretaker)	End of Role	July 2006		(Netherlands) Dick Advocaat	26 June 2006	
Amkar	(Russia) Sergei Oborin		August 2006		(Russia) Igor Uralyov (Caretaker)	August 2006	
Dynamo	(Russia) Yuri Semin	Resigned	4 August 2006	15th	(Russia) Andrey Kobelev	August 2006	
Amkar	(Russia) Igor Uralyov (Caretaker)	End of Role	September 2006		(Tajikistan) Rashid Rakhimov	September 2006	
Shinnik	(Russia) Oleg Dolmatov		September 2006		(Russia) Boris Gavrilov	September 2006	
Torpedo	(Russia) Sergei Petrenko		September 2006		(Russia) Aleksandr Gostenin	September 2006	
Lokomotiv	(Serbia) Slavoljub Muslin	Fired	5 October 2006		(Russia) Oleg Dolmatov	5 October 2006	

== Tournament format and regulations ==
Based on paragraph 15.3 of the Russian Premier League regulations for the current season, if two or more teams are equal on points (without having the highest number), the positions of these teams are determined by:

1. higher number of wins in all matches;
2. higher goal difference in all matches;
3. results of matches between the teams in question (1. higher number of points obtained; 2. higher number of wins; 3. higher goal difference; 4. higher number of goals scored; 5. higher number of away goals scored);
4. higher number of goals scored in all matches;
5. higher number of away goals scored in all matches;
6. drawing of lots.

Based on paragraph 15.4 of the regulations, if two teams are equal on the highest number of points, the first position is determined by:

1. higher number of wins in all matches;
2. results of matches between the two teams (1. higher number of points obtained; 2. higher goal difference; 3. higher number of goals scored; 4. higher number of away goals scored);
3. drawing of lots, or an additional match between the two teams, with extra time and a penalty shoot-out if necessary.

Based on paragraph 15.5 of the regulations, if more than two teams are equal on the highest number of points, the first position and subsequent positions of these teams are determined by:

1. higher number of wins in all matches;
2. higher goal difference in all matches;
3. results of matches between the teams in question (1. higher number of points obtained; 2. higher goal difference; 3. higher number of goals scored; 4. higher number of away goals scored);
4. drawing of lots, or an additional tournament between the teams in question.^{1}

^{1}The terms of this additional tournament are determined by the Russian Football Union and the governing body of the Russian Premier League based on suggestions from the participating clubs.

== League table ==
Pos	Team	Pld	W	D	L	GF	GA	GD	Pts	Qualification or relegation
1	CSKA Moscow (C)	30	17	7	6	47	28	+19	58	Qualification to Champions League group stage
2	Spartak Moscow	30	15	13	2	60	36	+24	58	Qualification to Champions League third qualifying round
3	Lokomotiv Moscow	30	15	8	7	47	34	+13	53	Qualification to UEFA Cup first round (Note: Qualified as the winner of 2006–07 Russian Cup.)
4	Zenit St. Petersburg	30	13	11	6	42	30	+12	50	Qualification to UEFA Cup second qualifying round
5	Rubin Kazan	30	14	7	9	45	35	+10	49	Qualification to Intertoto Cup second round
6	FC Moscow	30	10	13	7	41	37	+4	43	
7	Luch-Energiya Vladivostok	30	12	5	13	37	39	−2	41	
8	Tom Tomsk	30	11	8	11	35	33	+2	41	
9	Krylia Sovetov Samara	30	10	8	12	37	35	+2	38	
10	Spartak Nalchik	30	10	8	12	31	34	−3	38	
11	Saturn	30	7	16	7	29	24	+5	37	
12	Rostov	30	10	6	14	42	48	−6	36	
13	Amkar Perm	30	8	11	11	22	36	−14	35	
14	Dynamo Moscow	30	8	10	12	31	40	−9	34	
15	Torpedo Moscow (R)	30	3	13	14	22	40	−18	22	Relegation to First Division
16	Shinnik Yaroslavl (R)	30	1	8	21	17	56	−39	11	Relegation to First Division

Source: RFPL
Rules for classification: 1st points; 2nd matches won; 3rd goal difference; 4th head-to-head (points, matches won, goal difference, goals scored, away goals scored); 5th goals scored; 6th away goals scored; 7th drawing of lots
(C) Champions; (R) Relegated

== Results ==
Home \ Away	AMK	CSK	DYN	KRY	LOK	LUE	MOS	ROS	RUB	SAT	SHI	SPA	SPN	TOM	TOR	ZEN
Amkar Perm		0–0	3–2	1–0	1–3	0–0	2–2	1–0	0–0	1–0	1–0	1–3	1–0	0–0	1–0	1–3
CSKA Moscow	2–0		1–2	1–1	1–2	2–1	2–1	1–2	2–1	1–0	5–1	2–2	2–1	2–0	2–0	1–0
Dynamo Moscow	0–0	2–3		1–1	2–0	2–1	1–1	0–1	2–2	1–1	1–1	0–0	1–0	2–1	2–1	2–2
Krylia Sovetov Samara	6–1	2–0	1–0		1–2	2–1	0–4	1–0	0–0	0–0	2–0	0–1	1–2	2–1	2–0	3–2
Lokomotiv Moscow	0–0	3–2	2–0	0–1		3–0	0–1	1–0	4–4	0–0	1–0	0–0	2–3	1–1	0–0	3–1
Luch-Energiya	3–1	0–4	3–1	3–2	1–1		1–1	4–2	2–1	2–0	1–0	1–0	1–0	2–1	2–0	0–2
FC Moscow	1–0	0–1	1–1	1–0	0–1	2–1		4–0	0–5	2–1	4–1	3–3	1–1	0–0	1–1	0–0
Rostov	1–1	1–2	2–1	2–2	1–2	1–0	4–0		2–1	0–2	0–0	3–4	2–1	2–1	1–1	1–3
Rubin Kazan	1–0	1–0	0–1	2–1	2–4	1–0	2–0	2–1		0–3	0–0	2–0	0–0	2–0	1–1	3–0
Saturn	0–0	2–2	3–0	1–1	1–1	1–0	1–1	0–0	1–2		3–0	1–1	1–4	2–1	0–0	0–0
Shinnik Yaroslavl	0–0	0–1	1–2	1–0	1–3	1–3	1–2	1–6	1–5	0–0		1–1	0–1	0–1	1–1	1–2
Spartak Moscow	4–1	1–1	3–2	3–2	2–1	1–1	3–3	5–2	3–0	1–1	3–1		1–0	3–1	2–0	1–0
Spartak Nalchik	2–1	0–1	1–0	1–1	0–1	0–0	2–2	3–1	3–1	2–0	2–1	2–2		1–0	0–0	1–1
Tom Tomsk	1–3	0–1	1–0	2–1	3–1	2–1	1–0	3–1	4–0	0–0	3–1	2–2	1–0		0–0	2–2
Torpedo Moscow	0–0	2–2	3–0	1–1	1–4	2–1	0–2	0–2	1–2	0–3	1–1	1–1	2–0	1–2		1–2
Zenit St. Petersburg	2–0	0–0	0–0	1–0	4–1	3–1	1–1	1–1	1–0	1–1	1–0	1–4	4–0	0–0	2–1	

Legend: Blue = home team win; Yellow = draw; Red = away team win.

== Season statistics ==
=== Top goalscorers ===
As of matches played on 26 November 2006.

Rank	Player	Club	Goal
1	(Russia) Roman Pavlyuchenko	Spartak	18
2	(Brazil) Jô	CSKA	14
3	(Argentina) Alejandro Domínguez	Rubin	13
3	(Russia) Pavel Pogrebnyak	Tom	13
3	(Russia) Dmitri Loskov	Lokomotiv	13
6	(Russia) Dmitri Kirichenko	Moscow	12
6	(Russia) Mikhail Osinov	Rostov	12
8	(Brazil) Vágner Love	CSKA	9
8	(Croatia) Ivica Olić	CSKA	9
10	(Russia) Yegor Titov	Spartak	8
10	(Russia) Roman Adamov	Moscow	8

=== Statistics ===
- Goals: 585 (average 2.44 per match)
  - From penalties: 69 (12%)
  - Saved/Missed penalties: 19 (22%)
  - Goals scored home: 337 (58%)
  - Goals scored away: 247 (42%)
- Yellow cards: 1202 (average 5.01 per match)
  - For violent conduct: 730 (61%)
  - For unsporting behaviour: 387 (32%)
  - For undisciplined behaviour: 3 (0%)
  - Other: 82 (7%)
- Red cards: 62 (average 0.26 per match)
  - For second yellow card: 41 (66%)
  - For undisciplined behaviour: 7 (11%)
  - For denying an obvious goal-scoring opportunity: 6 (10%)
  - For violent conduct: 6 (10%)
  - For unsporting behaviour: 1 (2%)
  - For handball: 1 (2%)
- Attendance: 2,948,996 (average 12,287 per match; 98,300 per matchday)

== Awards ==
Russian Football Union named Andrey Arshavin the best Premier League player of the season. Arshavin was also ranked best by major Russian sports newspapers, Sport-Express and Soviet Sports and became the Russian Footballer of the Year.

On December 18, the Russian Football Union named its list of 33 top players:

Goalkeepers

1. (Russia) Igor Akinfeev (CSKA Moscow)
2. (Russia) Vyacheslav Malafeev (Zenit)
3. (Czech Republic) Antonín Kinský (Saturn)

Right backs

1. (Russia) Vasili Berezutskiy (CSKA Moscow)
2. (Russia) Aleksandr Anyukov (Zenit)
3. (Russia) Roman Shishkin (Spartak Moscow)

Right-centre backs

1. (Russia) Sergei Ignashevich (CSKA Moscow)
2. (Czech Republic) Martin Jiránek (Spartak Moscow)
3. (Norway) Erik Hagen (Zenit)

Left-centre backs

1. (Russia) Denis Kolodin (Dynamo Moscow)
2. (Lithuania) Deividas Šemberas (CSKA Moscow)
3. (Slovakia) Martin Škrtel (Zenit)

Left backs

1. (Russia) Aleksei Berezutskiy (CSKA Moscow)
2. (Russia) Oleg Kuzmin (Moskva)
3. (Brazil) Orlando Calisto (Rubin)

Defensive midfielders

1. (Bosnia and Herzegovina) Elvir Rahimić (CSKA Moscow)
2. (Russia) Evgeni Aldonin (CSKA Moscow)
3. (Brazil) Mozart (Spartak Moscow)

Right wingers

1. (Russia) Vladimir Bystrov (Spartak Moscow)
2. (Serbia) Miloš Krasić (CSKA Moscow)
3. (Russia) Valeri Klimov (Tom)

Central midfielders

1. (Russia) Dmitri Loskov (Lokomotiv Moscow)
2. (Russia) Yegor Titov (Spartak Moscow)
3. (Brazil) Daniel Carvalho (CSKA Moscow)

Left wingers

1. (Russia) Yuri Zhirkov (CSKA Moscow)
2. (Russia) Diniyar Bilyaletdinov (Lokomotiv Moscow)
3. (Belarus) Sergei Gurenko (Lokomotiv Moscow)

Right forwards

1. (Russia) Andrey Arshavin (Zenit)
2. (Russia) Pavel Pogrebnyak (Tom)
3. (Brazil) Jô (CSKA Moscow)

Left forwards

1. (Russia) Roman Pavlyuchenko (Spartak Moscow)
2. (Argentina) Alejandro Domínguez (Rubin)
3. (Brazil) Vágner Love (CSKA Moscow)

== Medal squads ==
1. PFC CSKA Moscow

Goalkeepers: Igor Akinfeev (28), Vladimir Gabulov (3), Veniamin Mandrykin (1).
Defenders: Aleksei Berezutski (29), Sergei Ignashevich (26 / 2), Vasili Berezutski (26 / 1), Deividas Šemberas (Lithuania) (24), Anton Grigoryev (5), Chidi Odiah (Nigeria) (3).
Midfielders: Elvir Rahimić (Bosnia and Herzegovina) (30 / 1), Dudu (Brazil) (28 / 2), Evgeni Aldonin (28), Yuri Zhirkov (27 / 1), Miloš Krasić (Serbia) (26 / 3), Rolan Gusev (18 / 1), Ivan Taranov (13), Kirill Kochubei (4).
Forwards: Ivica Olić (Croatia) (24 / 9), Vágner Love (Brazil) (23 / 9), Jô (Brazil) (18 / 14), Aleksandr Salugin (5).
(league appearances and goals listed in brackets)

Manager: Valery Gazzaev.

Transferred out during the season: none.

2. FC Spartak Moscow

Goalkeepers: Wojciech Kowalewski (Poland) (27), Dmitri Khomich (3), Aleksei Zuev (1).
Defenders: Radoslav Kováč (Czech Republic) (27 / 2), Martin Jiránek (Czech Republic) (26 / 2), Martin Stranzl (Austria) (25), Clemente Rodríguez (Argentina) (20 / 1), Roman Shishkin (14 / 1), Géder (Brazil) (8), Adrian Iencsi (Romania) (7), Gabriel Tamaș (Romania) (3), Sergei Kabanov (1), Fyodor Kudryashov (1), Andrei Ivanov (1), Yevgeni Shpedt (1).
Midfielders: Yegor Titov (25 / 7), Vladimir Bystrov (24 / 6), Serghei Covalciuc (Moldova) (23), Mozart (Brazil) (22 / 4), Denis Boyarintsev (22 / 2), Maksym Kalynychenko (Ukraine) (15 / 3), Quincy (Ghana) (15 / 1), Dmitri Torbinski (13), Aleksei Rebko (9).
Forwards: Roman Pavlyuchenko (27 / 18), Fernando Cavenaghi (Argentina) (17 / 5), Aleksandr Pavlenko (12 / 1), Nikita Bazhenov (11 / 3), Mihajlo Pjanović (Serbia) (8 / 3), Artyom Dzyuba (5).

Manager: Aleksandrs Starkovs (Latvia) (until April), Vladimir Fedotov (from July).

Transferred out during the season: Gabriel Tamaș (Romania) (to Celta de Vigo).

3. FC Lokomotiv Moscow

Goalkeepers: Aleksei Poliakov (Uzbekistan) (23), Eldin Jakupović (Switzerland) (5), Sergei Ryzhikov (2).
Defenders: Branislav Ivanović (Serbia) (28 / 2), Vadim Evseev (24), Emir Spahić (Bosnia and Herzegovina) (21), Oleg Pashinin (Uzbekistan) (20), Dmitri Sennikov (14), Malkhaz Asatiani (Georgia (country)) (14), Fininho (Brazil) (12), Marián Had (Slovakia) (6), Dmitri Kruglov (Estonia) (2), Inal Getigezhev (1).
Midfielders: Dmitri Loskov (29 / 13), Diniyar Bilyaletdinov (29 / 3), Sergei Gurenko (Belarus) (29 / 1), Marat Izmailov (16 / 1), Aleksandr Samedov (13), Ivan Starkov (12 / 2), Laryea Kingston (Ghana) (12), Shaker Zouagi (Tunisia) (11 / 1), André Bikey (Cameroon) (5), Vladimir Maminov (Uzbekistan) (5).
Forwards: Garry O'Connor (Scotland) (24 / 7), Dmitri Sychev (24 / 7), Dramane Traoré (Mali) (21 / 6), Shamil Asildarov (4 / 1), Giorgi Chelidze (Georgia (country)) (4).

Manager: Slavoljub Muslin (Serbia) (until October), Oleg Dolmatov (from October).

Transferred out during the season: Dmitri Kruglov (Estonia) (to FC Kuban Krasnodar), André Bikey (Cameroon) (to Reading F.C.).

== Attendances ==
Rank	Club	Average
1	Zenit	21,954
2	Spartak Moscow	17,215
3	Krylia Sovetov	16,980
4	Rubin	13,727
5	Spartak Nalchik	13,547
6	Amkar	13,507
7	Lokomotiv Moscow	13,066
8	Tom	12,800
9	PFC CSKA	10,913
10	Saturn	10,530
11	Luch	9,913
12	Rostov	8,987
13	Shinnik	8,393
14	Dynamo Moscow	8,067
15	Torpedo Moscow	5,333
16	FC Moscow	5,307

== See also ==
2006 in Russian Football
