= Bohemians 1905 =

Czech association football club in Vršovice, Prague

Bohemians Praha 1905
- Full name: Bohemians Praha 1905, a.s.
- Nicknames: Bohemka; Klokani (Kangaroos)
- Founded: 1905; 121 years ago
- Ground: Ďolíček
- Capacity: 5,000
- Chairman: Darek Jakubowicz
- Manager: Jaroslav Veselý
- League: Czech First League
- 2025–26: 10th of 16
- Website: www.bohemians.cz
Home colours	Away colours

Bohemians Praha 1905, commonly known as Bohemka or Bohemians Prague, is a professional football club based in Vršovice, Prague, Czech Republic. The club competes in the Czech First League, the top division in the Czech Republic football league system. Founded in 1905 as AFK Vršovice, the club won the 1982–83 Czechoslovak First League, its only league championship. Its traditional home colours are green and white and a stylized kangaroo serves as both emblem and mascot, which gave rise to its more recent nickname Klokani ("Kangaroos").

The best-known player from Bohemians' history is Antonín Panenka, who is now the club chairman. Bohemians' mascot is a kangaroo, the legacy of a 1927 tour of Australia. Following the tour, the club was awarded two live kangaroos, which they donated to the Prague Zoo.

== History ==
Founded as AFK Vršovice, the club played at the top level of football in the Czechoslovak First League between 1925 and 1935. They spent seasons in and out of the top division for the next 40 years before remaining in the top flight between 1973 and 1995, the most successful era for the club. In the 1982–83 season the club won the Czechoslovak First League and advanced to the semi-finals of the UEFA Cup. In the year 2005 it survived a crisis, which was a consequence of bad management. The club was prevented from taking part in the second part of the 2004–05 Czech 2. Liga and its results were expunged. The club was relegated to the 3rd Czech division due to its financial insolvency, but later was saved by its fans who paid off a portion of the club's debts.

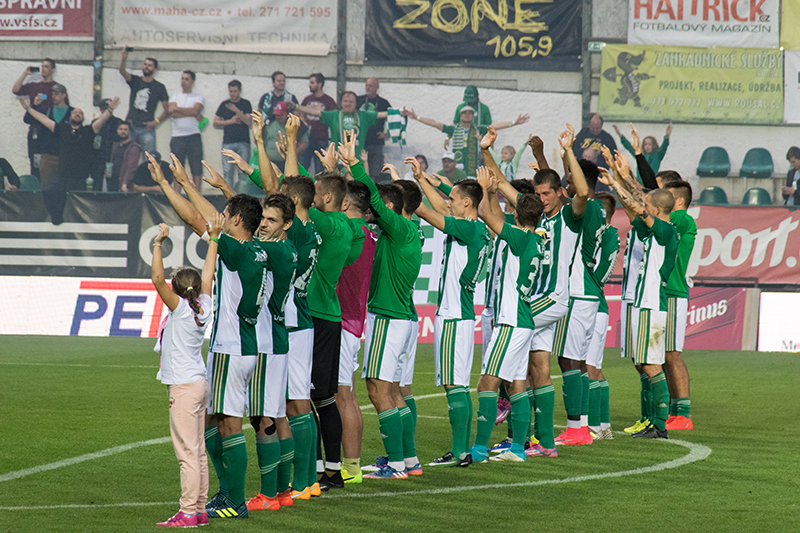
Bohemians Praha celebrating with their fans after the game

The club finished third in the 2005–06 Bohemian Football League, missing out on promotion, but advanced to the Second League regardless, as they bought a license to play in the Second League from SC Xaverov. The club was then able to advance back to the top flight in 2007, where they played until relegation in 2012. After only one season in 2. Liga Bohemians returned to the First League in 2013.

=== Historical names ===
- 1905: AFK Vršovice
- 1927: Bohemians AFK Vršovice
- 1941: Bohemia AFK Vršovice
- 1945: Bohemians AFK Vršovice
- 1948: Sokol Vršovice Bohemians
- 1949: Sokol Železničaři Bohemians Praha
- 1950: Sokol Železničaři Praha
- 1951: Sokol ČKD Stalingrad Praha
- 1953: Spartak Praha Stalingrad
- 1962: ČKD Praha
- 1965: Bohemians ČKD Praha
- 1993: Bohemians Praha
- 1999: CU Bohemians Praha
- 2001: FC Bohemians Praha
- 2005: Bohemians 1905
- 2013: Bohemians Praha 1905

=== Australia tour ===
In 1927 Australian football officials were looking for a European football club to come and tour. They decided on Czechoslovakia and approached Slavia Prague and Viktoria Žižkov who both declined. AFK Vršovice took up the offer.

Before leaving the team looked for a suitable name as they felt the Australians would not know where Vršovice was, let alone be able to pronounce it. They decided on Bohemians (i.e. the Czechs), referring to the country/nation they were from.

==== Matches played ====
- 4–2 (United Kingdom) British Army XI Colombo, Ceylon (Now Sri Lanka)
- 11–3 Western Australia, Perth
- 6–4 Western Australia, Perth
- 11–1 South Australia, Adelaide
- 2–1 Australia Repr. XI, Adelaide
- 1–0 (Australia) Victoria Melbourne, Melbourne
- 4–1 Australia Repr. XI, Melbourne
- 9–0 (Australia) Wagga-Wagga XI, Wagga Wagga
- 4–5 (Australia) New South Wales, Sydney
- 2–1 (Australia) Illawarra District, Wollongong
- 4–3 (Australia) New South Wales XI, Newcastle
- 6–4 Australia, Sydney
- 2–3 Australia, Brisbane
- 5–5 Australia, Brisbane
- 1–3 (Australia) Maitland, Maitland
- 5–3 (Australia) Queensland, Ipswich
- 5–3 (Australia) Metropolis, Sydney
- 4–4 Australia, Sydney
- 3–2 Western Australia, Perth

=== Naming dispute with FK Bohemians ===
In 1993, Bohemians 1905 broke away from the TJ Bohemians Praha sports franchise and became a separate legal entity. The club functioned normally until financial troubles came up and the club nearly collapsed in 2005. TJ Bohemians took advantage of the situation and rented out the Bohemians logo to FC Střížkov Praha 9, a lowly team in the third tier of Czech football. TJ were able to pour money into the small club and help them rise to the first division. However, fans remained loyal to the Bohemians 1905 team, and helped the large club to recover.

In September 2012, a Czech court ruled that the former Střížkov club must not continue to use the name Bohemians after 31 January 2013. However, in December 2012, the club was granted the right to appeal against the decision, thus protracting the process yet further.

In 2016, Střížkov's men's team was dissolved, and in 2017 the whole club dissolved, with the women's team becoming FC Praha.

== Stadium ==
The home stadium, located in Vršovice, is called Ďolíček. However, from the 2010–11 season, for a period of five years, Bohemians undertook to play its home matches at Synot Tip Arena. This arrangement was discontinued in 2012 after the club was relegated from the Czech First League, due to the regulations on stadiums being different between the two leagues.

== Kits ==
Period	Kit manufacturer	Shirt sponsor
1989–1990	Adidas	None
1992–1993	Adidas	Rank Xerox
1993–1994	Adidas	RC Cola
1994–1995	KSM	PasserInvest
1995–1996	Adidas	PasserInvest
1996–1998	Adidas	None
1999–2000	Adidas	Commercial Union
2000–2001	Adidas	Commercial Union Velkopopovický Kozel
2001–2002	Adidas	Commercial Union; Ericsson
2002–2003	Adidas	Union Pojišťovna
2003–2004	Umbro	Union Pojišťovna; AAA Auto
2005–2006	Kelme	None
2006	Kelme	Remal
2007–2008	Umbro	Remal
2008–2011	Umbro	Fortuna; Remal
2011–2012	Adidas	Fortuna; Remal
2012–2019	Adidas	Remal
2019–2022	Adidas	Balshop.cz
2022–	Puma	Balshop.cz

== Club identity, supporters and rivalries ==
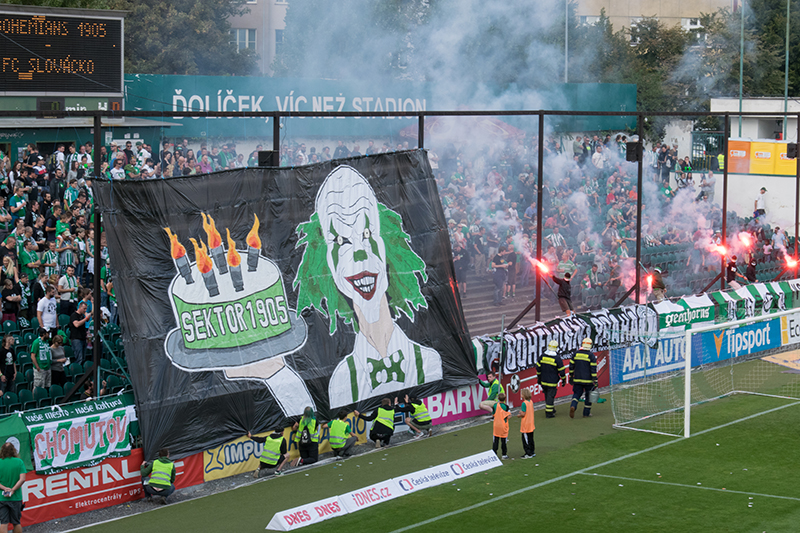
Bohemians' Supporters, 2017

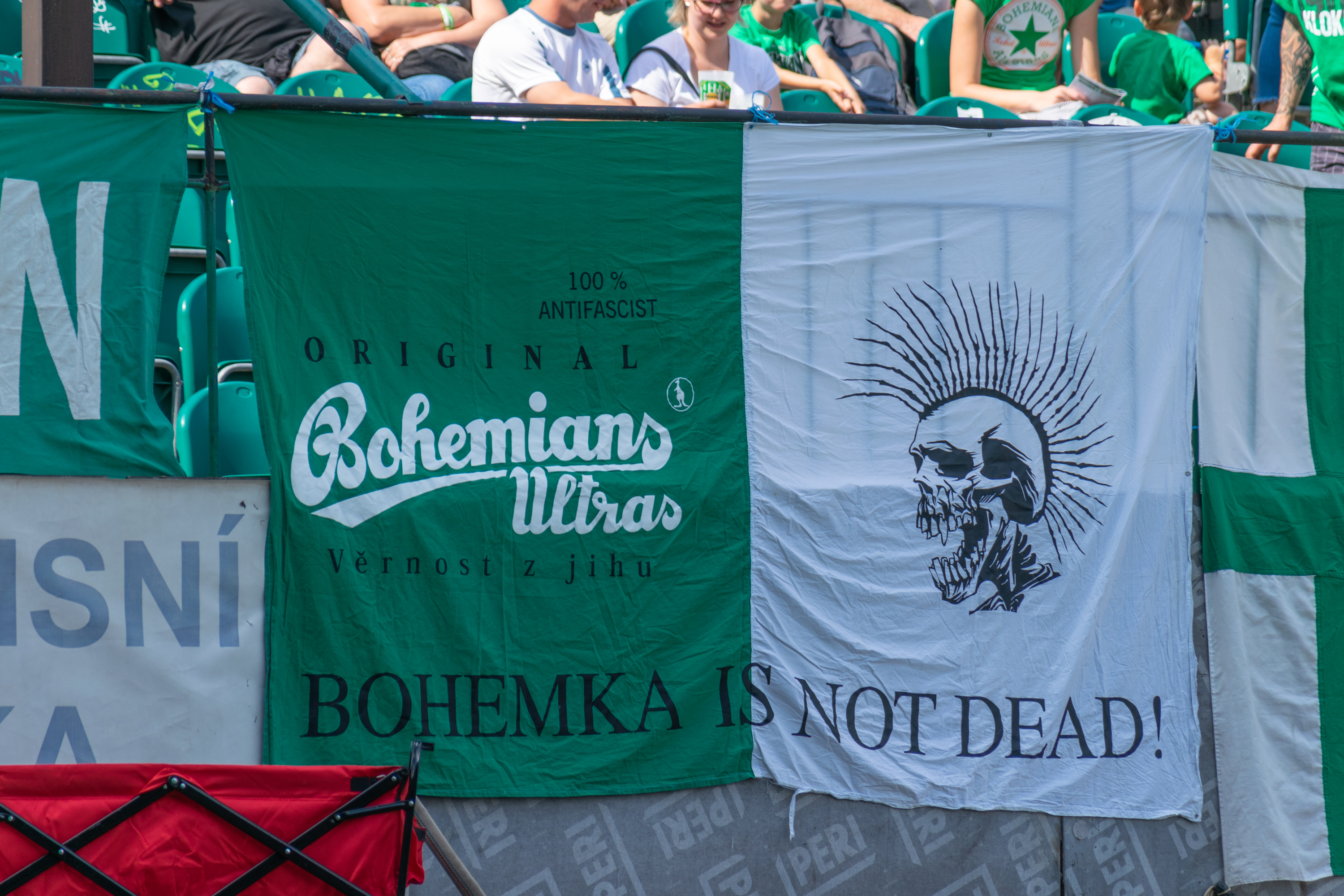
Bohemians' fan banner in 2018

Bohemians 1905 are associated with a left-liberal fanbase. The Prague-based club, known affectionately as "Bohemka", has cultivated a supporter culture rooted in countercultural and progressive values. Unlike many other top-flight Czech teams, Bohemians fans are known less for aggression or nationalism and more for their laid-back, communal atmosphere. On match days at their compact and idiosyncratic Ďolíček stadium, the terraces are often filled with fans drinking beer, waving green-and-white flags, and openly smoking cannabis. The club's anti-fascist ultras express their politics through music, stickers, and banners referencing punk, ska, and reggae subcultures. Bohemians' identity contrasts sharply with clubs like Sparta Prague and Baník Ostrava, which have a history of attracting far-right supporters. When these teams meet, ideological tensions often surface. In one incident described in reporting from VICE, Baník supporters unveiled an Islamophobic banner, prompting a unified and vocal rejection from the Bohemians stands. While not all Bohemians fans are politically active or left-leaning, the dominant fan culture strongly rejects racism and far-right nationalism. Supporter involvement in the club has extended beyond ideology and matchday rituals. When the club faced bankruptcy in the early 2000s, fans contributed directly to keeping it afloat and reportedly now own a minority share. This grassroots support has fostered a sense of collective ownership and solidarity.

They maintain friendly contacts with Dubliners Bohemian FC, Left-wing fans have friendship with FC St. Pauli and AS Trenčín. Right-wing fans have friendship with Górnik Wałbrzych, 1. FC Lokomotive Leipzig and hooligans with FK Pardubice.

There have been several conflicts in the past between left-wing fans of Bohemians 1905 and right-wing fans of other teams. The most famous are the fights in 2013 in the match against FC MAS Táborsko and in 2015 in the match against SK Sigma Olomouc.

The most prestigious match is the derby with Slavia Prague. The "Vršovice Derby" is the second most prestigious derby in Prague (after the Slavia-Sparta derby). Slavia and Bohemians are located in the Vršovice district of Prague and their stadiums are separated by only 1 km. Sparta Prague are considered their biggest rivals, and Viktoria Zizkov is the other team with whom they contest the city derbies. FK Bohemians Prague (Střížkov) were widely viewed by Bohemians 1905 supporters as an unauthorised continuation of the original club, leading to tensions that were primarily directed at the club's management rather than its fanbase. The rivalry played out on the pitch and in legal disputes, although FK Bohemians Prague (Střížkov) attracted limited public support and did not develop a significant organised fan movement.

== Players ==
=== Current squad ===
As of 2 September 2026

Note: Flags indicate national team as defined under FIFA eligibility rules; some limited exceptions apply. Players may hold more than one non-FIFA nationality.

No.	Pos.	Nation	Player
3	DF	CZE	Matěj Kadlec
6	MF	ZAM	Benson Sakala
7	MF	CZE	Dominik Pleštil
8	DF	CZE	David Heidenreich
9	FW	CZE	Ladislav Krobot
10	FW	CZE	Jan Matoušek
11	MF	CZE	Václav Pilař
12	GK	CZE	Michal Reichl
13	FW	CZE	Vladimír Zeman
14	FW	EGY	Mohamed Yasser
15	DF	ZAM	Mathews Banda
16	MF	CZE	Roman Květ
17	DF	CZE	Jakub Tichý
18	DF	CZE	Denis Vala

No.	Pos.	Nation	Player
19	MF	CZE	Jan Kovařík
22	DF	CZE	Jan Vondra
23	GK	SVK	Tomáš Frühwald
24	DF	CZE	Milan Havel
25	DF	NGR	Peter Kareem
27	DF	CZE	David Lischka
32	DF	CZE	Petr Mirvald
42	MF	CZE	Vojtěch Smrž
47	MF	CZE	Aleš Čermák
62	MF	UKR	Samuel Obinaya (on loan from Jablonec)
66	MF	CZE	Oliver Mikuda
70	MF	CZE	Šimon Černý
71	GK	CZE	Jakub Šiman
99	FW	SVK	Ladislav Almási

=== Out on loan ===
Note: Flags indicate national team as defined under FIFA eligibility rules; some limited exceptions apply. Players may hold more than one non-FIFA nationality.

No.	Pos.	Nation	Player
—	GK	CZE	Jakub Kerbach (at Táborsko)

== Reserves ==
As of 2025–26, the club's reserve team Bohemians 1905 B plays in the Bohemian Football League (3rd tier of Czech football system). They play their home matches at the club's stadium, Ďolíček.

== Player records in the Czech First League ==
As of 18 September 2026.

Highlighted players are in the current squad.

=== Most appearances ===
#	Name	Matches
1	(Czech Republic) Josef Jindřišek	357
2	(Czech Republic) David Bartek	296
3	(Czech Republic) Martin Dostál	241
4	(Czech Republic) Lukáš Hůlka	227
5	(Czech Republic) Michal Šmíd	161
6	(Czech Republic) Daniel Krch	160
7	(Czech Republic) Jan Vondra	141
8	(Czech Republic) Jan Kovařík	137
9	(Czech Republic) Daniel Köstl	136
10	(Czech Republic) Jan Moravec	135

=== Most goals ===
#	Name	Goals
1	(Czech Republic) David Puškáč	25
2	(Czech Republic) David Bartek	24
3	(Czech Republic) Josef Jindřišek	22
4	(Czech Republic) Jan Matoušek	20
5	(Czech Republic) Petr Hronek	18
5	(Czech Republic) Lukáš Hůlka	18
7	(Czech Republic) Milan Škoda	17
7	(Czech Republic) Roman Květ	17
9	(Bahrain) Abdulla Yusuf Helal	15
10	(Czech Republic) Lukáš Hartig	14

=== Most clean sheets ===
#	Name	Clean sheets
1	(Czech Republic) Radek Sňozík	33
2	(Slovakia) Kamil Čontofalský	24
3	(Czech Republic) Tomáš Fryšták	21

== Management and technical staff ==
Position	Name
Head coach	Jaroslav Veselý
Assistant coach	Ivan Hašek junior David Bartek
Goalkeeper coach	Miroslav Miller
Reserve coach	Vladimír Hruška

== Managers and players ==
=== Head coaches in club's history ===
- 1934 Karel Meduna
- 1940 Ladislav Ženíšek
- 1945 Antonín Lanhaus
- 1972 Bohumil Musil
- 1977 Tomáš Pospíchal
- 1983 Josef Zadina
- 1983 Jiří Rubáš
- 1983 Tomáš Pospíchal
- 1987 Michal Jelínek
- 1987 Dušan Uhrin
- 1988 Josef Zadina
- 1989 Josef Ledecký
- 1991 Josef Hloušek
- 1993 Petr Packert
- 1994 Mario Buzek
- 1994 František Barát
- 1995 Svatopluk Bouška
- 1995 Dalibor Lacina
- 1996 Josef Hloušek
- 1996 Miloš Beznoska and Antonín Panenka (caretakers)
- 1996 Vladimír Borovička (caretaker)
- 1996 Vlastimil Petržela
- 2002 Vladimír Borovička (caretaker)
- 2002 Dušan Uhrin, Jr.
- 2005 Zbyněk Busta
- 2008 Pavel Hoftych
- 2011 Pavel Medynský
- 2012 Jozef Weber
- 2014 Luděk Klusáček
- 2014 Roman Pivarník
- 2016 Miroslav Koubek
- 2017 Martin Hašek
- 2019 Luděk Klusáček
- 2022 Jaroslav Veselý

=== Club hall of fame ===
- (Czech Republic) Karel Bejbl
- (Czech Republic) Přemysl Bičovský
- (Czech Republic) Milan Čermák
- (Czech Republic) Karol Dobiáš
- (Czech Republic) Jaroslav Kamenický
- (Czech Republic) Antonín Panenka
- (Czech Republic) Tomáš Pospíchal
- (Czech Republic) Jiří Rubáš
- (Czech Republic) Dalibor Slezák
- (Czech Republic) Radek Sňozík

== History in domestic competitions ==
- 1993–95: Czech First League
- 1995–96: Czech 2. Liga
- 1996–97: Czech First League
- 1997–99: Czech 2. Liga
- 1999–03: Czech First League
- 2003–05: Czech 2. Liga
- 2005–06: Bohemian Football League
- 2006–07: Czech 2. Liga
- 2007–08: Czech First League
- 2008–09: Czech 2. Liga
- 2009–12: Czech First League
- 2012–13: Czech 2. Liga
- 2013–: Czech First League

- Seasons spent at Level 1 of the football league system: 23
- Seasons spent at Level 2 of the football league system: 8
- Seasons spent at Level 3 of the football league system: 1
- Seasons spent at Level 4 of the football league system: 0

=== Czech Republic ===
Season	League	Placed	Pld	W	D	L	GF	GA	GD	Pts	Cup
1993–94	1. liga	14th	30	8	7	15	29	54	–25	23	Quarter-finals
1994–95	1. liga	15th	30	6	5	19	35	62	–27	23	Round of 16
1995–96	2. liga	4th	30	13	9	8	47	31	+16	48	Round of 32
1996–97	1. liga	16th	30	4	7	19	22	53	–31	19	Round of 32
1997–98	2. liga	3rd	28	15	8	5	49	22	+27	53	Round of 16
1998–99	2. liga	1st	30	23	4	3	62	12	+50	73	Round of 64
1999–00	1. liga	7th	30	10	10	10	24	28	–4	40	Round of 32
2000–01	1. liga	9th	30	10	10	10	33	34	–1	40	Round of 16
2001–02	1. liga	4th	30	14	6	10	40	35	–5	48	Round of 16
2002–03	1. liga	15th	30	5	9	16	34	56	–22	24	Round of 32
2003–04	2. liga	3rd	30	13	12	5	37	21	+16	51	Round of 32
2004–05	2. liga	16th	0	0	0	0	0	0	0	0†	First round
2005–06	3. liga	4th	34	16	12	6	58	32	+26	60	First round
2006–07	2. liga	2nd	30	18	6	6	47	21	+26	60	Round of 64
2007–08	1. liga	15th	30	5	11	14	24	40	–16	26	Round of 16
2008–09	2. liga	1st	30	18	9	3	36	14	+22	63	Round of 64
2009–10	1. liga	12th	30	8	10	12	21	29	–8	34	Round of 16
2010–11	1. liga	6th	30	12	7	11	33	33	0	43	Round of 64
2011–12	1. liga	15th	30	6	6	18	20	54	–34	24	Round of 32
2012–13	2. liga	2nd	30	16	8	6	50	25	+25	56	Round of 64
2013–14	1. liga	14th	30	7	9	14	26	40	–14	30	Round of 64
2014–15	1. liga	8th	30	10	8	12	35	41	–6	38	Round of 16
2015–16	1. liga	9th	30	8	13	9	35	37	–2	37	Round of 32
2016–17	1. liga	13th	30	7	7	16	22	39	–17	28	Quarter-finals
2017–18	1. liga	7th	30	9	11	10	30	29	+1	38	Round of 32
2018–19	1. liga	13th	35	9	13	13	33	43	–10	40	Semi-finals
2019–20	1. liga	8th	34	15	6	13	44	47	–3	51	Round of 32
2020–21	1. liga	10th	34	10	13	11	40	37	+3	43	Round of 16
2021–22	1. liga	14th	35	8	10	17	45	61	–16	34	Quarter-finals
2022–23	1. liga	4th	35	15	7	13	56	58	–2	52	Semi-finals
2023–24	1. liga	13th	35	9	12	14	34	48	–14	39	Round of 16
2024–25	1. liga	8th	34	10	10	14	37	46	–9	40	Quarter-finals
2025–26	1. liga	10th	32	11	6	15	29	39	–10	39	Round of 16
2026–27	1. liga										Round of 16

Notes: † results expunged

== History in European competitions ==
Season	Competition	Round	Opponent	Home	Away	Aggregate
1975–76	UEFA Cup	1R	(Hungary) Budapest Honvéd	1–2	1–1	2–3
1979–80	UEFA Cup	1R	(Germany) Bayern Munich	0–2	2–2	2–4
1980–81	UEFA Cup	1R	(Spain) Sporting de Gijón	3–1	1–2	4–3
1980–81	UEFA Cup	2R	(England) Ipswich Town	2–0	0–3	0–3
1981–82	UEFA Cup	1R	(Spain) Valencia	0–1	0–1	0–2
1982–83	UEFA Cup	1R	(Austria) Admira/Wacker	5–0	2–1	7–1
1982–83	UEFA Cup	2R	(France) Saint-Étienne	4–0	0–0	4–0
1982–83	UEFA Cup	3R	(Switzerland) Servette	2–1	2–2	4–3
1982–83	UEFA Cup	QF	(Scotland) Dundee United	1–0	0–0	1–0
1982–83	UEFA Cup	SF	(Belgium) Anderlecht	0–1	1–3	1–4
1983–84	European Cup	1R	(Turkey) Fenerbahçe	4–0	1–0	5–0
1983–84	European Cup	2R	(Austria) Rapid Wien	2–1	0–1	2–2 (a.g.)
1984–85	UEFA Cup	1R	(Cyprus) Apollon Limassol	6–1	2–2	8–3
1984–85	UEFA Cup	2R	(Netherlands) Ajax	1–0	0–1	1–1 (4–2 p)
1984–85	UEFA Cup	3R	(England) Tottenham Hotspur	1–1	0–2	1–3
1985–86	UEFA Cup	1R	(Hungary) Rába Györ	4–1 (a.e.t.)	1–3	5–4
1985–86	UEFA Cup	2R	(Germany) FC Köln	0–4	2–4	2–8
1987–88	UEFA Cup	1R	(Belgium) Beveren	1–0	0–2	1–2
2023–24	Europa Conference League	2Q	(Norway) Bodø/Glimt	2−4	0–3	2−7

== Club records ==
=== Czech First League records ===
- Best position: 4th (2001–02, 2022–23)
- Worst position: 16th (1996–97)
- Biggest home win: Bohemians 4–0 Blšany (2000–01), Bohemians 4–0 Teplice (2019–20), Bohemians 4–0 Mladá Boleslav (2020–21), Bohemians 4–0 Mladá Boleslav (2022–23)
- Biggest away win: Příbram 1–5 Bohemians (2001–02)
- Biggest home defeat: Bohemians 0–4 Žižkov (1994–95), Bohemians 0–4 Ostrava (2001–02), Bohemians 0–4 Sparta (2011–12), Bohemians 0–4 Slavia (2024–25)
- Biggest away defeat: Drnovice 6–0 Bohemians (1996–97)

== Honours ==
- Czechoslovak First League (first tier)
  - Champions: 1982–83
  - Runners-up: 1984–85
- Czechoslovak Cup
  - Runners-up: 1982
  - Czech Cup (as part of the Czechoslovak Cup)
    - Champions: 1982
