= Boris Gavrilov =

Boris Gavrilov may refer to:

- Boris Anatolyevich Gavrilov (born 1952), Russian football coach
- Boris Petrovich Gavrilov (1944–2006), Soviet rugby union player
