= Radek Sňozík =

Czech football goalkeeper

Personal information
- Full name: Radek Sňozík
- Date of birth: 17 October 1975 (age 51)
- Place of birth: Czechoslovakia
- Height: 1.85 m (6 ft 1 in)
- Position: Goalkeeper

Youth career
- 1982–1993: SK Tachov

Senior career*
Years	Team	Apps	(Gls)
1993–1994	VTJ Tábor		
1994–1995	SK Tachov		
1995–1996	SK Rakovník		
1997–2000	SK Tachov		
2000–2006	Příbram	61	(0)
2006–2013	Bohemians 1905	184	(6)
- * Club domestic league appearances and goals as of 8 June 2013

Radek Sňozík (born 17 October 1975) is a Czech football goalkeeper. He last played for Bohemians 1905 and captained the team.

Sňozík played most of his Gambrinus liga career for Marila Příbram, where he spent six seasons before moving to Bohemians 1905. A goalkeeper who had been taking penalties since his days in youth football, he scored his first penalty for Bohemians in a 2–1 loss to national league home match against FC Tescoma Zlín in November 2007. He was repeatedly voted as the Fans' Player of the Year at Bohemians 1905.

Bohemians 1905 decided against renewing his contract after their promotion to Gambrinus liga for the 2013–14 season and Sňozík became a free agent.
