= Jaroslav Gürtler =

Czech football manager

Personal information
- Date of birth: 23 December 1954 (age 71)

Managerial career
- Years: Team
- 1987–1990: Baník Ostrava (assistant)
- 1990–1992: Baník Ostrava
- 1995–1999: Al-Nasr
- 2000–2001: Baník Ostrava
- 2002: 1. FC Košice
- 2010: FC Hlučín
- 2010–2011: Al-Nasr

Jaroslav Gürtler (born 23 December 1954) is a Czech football manager.
