= Jozef Čurgaly =

Slovak footballer and manager

Personal information
- Date of birth: 4 December 1927
- Place of birth: Czechoslovakia
- Date of death: 23 January 2014 (aged 86)
- Position: Forward

Senior career*
| Years | Team | Apps | (Gls) |
- ŠK Slovan Bratislava
- FC Nitra

International career
| 1953 | Czechoslovakia | 1 | (0) |

Managerial career
- 1966: ŠK Slovan Bratislava
- 1967: FC Baník Ostrava
- 1968–1970: FC Nitra
- 1970–1971: Jednota Trenčín
- * Club domestic league appearances and goals

Jozef Čurgaly (4 December 1927 - 23 January 2014) was a former Slovak football player and manager.

He played for ŠK Slovan Bratislava and FC Nitra.

He coached ŠK Slovan Bratislava, FC Baník Ostrava and FC Nitra.
