= Jan Vondra =

Czech footballer (born 1995)

Personal information
- Date of birth: 13 September 1995 (age 31)
- Place of birth: Prague, Czech Republic
- Height: 1.77 m (5 ft 10 in)
- Positions: Centre-back; left-back

Team information
- Current team: Bohemians 1905
- Number: 22

Youth career
- –2013: Sparta Prague

Senior career*
| Years | Team | Apps | (Gls) |
| 2014–2018 | Sparta Prague B | 0 | (0) |
| 2014 | → Pardubice (loan) | 12 | (1) |
| 2015 | → Viktoria Žižkov (loan) | 3 | (0) |
| 2015–2016 | → Vlašim (loan) | 32 | (0) |
| 2017 | → Karviná (loan) | 7 | (0) |
| 2018 | → České Budějovice | 4 | (0) |
| 2019–2022 | Bohemians 1905 | 56 | (1) |
| 2020 | → Baník Sokolov (loan) | 13 | (0) |
| 2022 | Shkëndija | 3 | (0) |
| 2023– | Bohemians 1905 | 85 | (0) |

International career
| 2011 | Czech Republic U16 | 4 | (0) |
| 2011–2012 | Czech Republic U17 | 17 | (0) |
| 2013 | Czech Republic U18 | 6 | (0) |
- * Club domestic league appearances and goals as of 29 October 2026

Jan Vondra (born 13 September 1995) is a Czech professional footballer who plays as a defender for Bohemians 1905.

== Life ==
Jan Vondra was born on 13 September 1995 in Prague.

== Club career ==
Vondra was raised in Sparta Prague, but he did not make it to the senior team and had loan spells at various clubs (Pardubice, Viktoria Žižkov, Vlašim, Karviná, Dynamo České Budějovice), mostly playing in the Czech National Football League. He made his Czech First League debut during a loan spell in Karviná in the 2016–17 season.

In 2019, he transferred to Bohemians 1905 and became a regular of the team's defensive line. After the 2021–22 season, he transferred to Shkëndija and became the first ever Czech footballer who played in North Macedonia. However, due to a change in the club's management, he only played three games before the club terminated his contract. He then returned to Bohemians 1905.

During his career, he played more than 140 first-league matches for Bohemians (as of October 2026), the 7th most in club's first-league history.

== International career ==
Vondra played for the U16, U17 and U18 Czech Republic youth national teams.
