= Jiří Rubáš =

Czech footballer and manager (1922–2005)

Personal information
- Date of birth: 5 February 1922
- Place of birth: Rokycany, Czechoslovakia
- Date of death: 16 May 2005 (aged 83)
- Place of death: Prague, Czech Republic
- Positions: Defender; midfielder

Youth career
- SK Rokycany

Senior career*
Years	Team	Apps	(Gls)
- Bohemians Prague
- Viktoria Žižkov
- SK Hradec Králové

International career
1949–1952	Czechoslovakia	6	(0)

Managerial career
- 1954–1969: Bohemians Prague
- 1969–1970: Baník Ostrava
- 1970–1975: Škoda Plzeň
- 1976–1977: Baník Ostrava
- 1978–1981: Sparta Prague
- 1986–1987: FK Teplice
- * Club domestic league appearances and goals

Jiří Rubáš (5 February 1922 – 16 May 2005) was a Czech football manager and former player.

As a player, Rubáš played mostly for Bohemians Prague. He also played for the Czechoslovakia national team, for which he appeared in six matches between 1949 and 1952.

In 1954 he ended his active career and immediately began working as a football manager at Bohemians Prague. He coached them for 14 years before moving to Baník Ostrava. Rubáš coached several top Czech clubs, including Baník Ostrava, Škoda Plzeň and Sparta Prague. Rubáš was appointed as a new manager of Baník in the half of the 1975–1976 season and led Baník to the surprising title of Czechoslovak champions, for the first time in club's history.
