= Aleksandr Gostenin =

Russian footballer and coach

Personal information
- Full name: Aleksandr Nikolayevich Gostenin
- Date of birth: 29 April 1955 (age 71)
- Height: 1.75 m (5 ft 9 in)
- Position: Defender

Team information
- Current team: FC Yenisey Krasnoyarsk (assistant)

Senior career*
Years	Team	Apps	(Gls)
1978–1980	FC Kairat	71	(1)
1980–1986	FC Torpedo Moscow	145	(0)
1987	Neftchi Baku PFC	5	(0)
Total		221	(1)

Managerial career
- 1993–1994: FC Torpedo Moscow (assistant)
- 1995–1998: FC Dynamo Barnaul
- 2003–2004: FC Torpedo Moscow (reserves assistant)
- 2004: FC Tom Tomsk
- 2005: FC Torpedo Moscow (reserves assistant)
- 2006: FC Torpedo Moscow (assistant)
- 2006: FC Torpedo Moscow (caretaker)
- 2008–2009: FC Volga Nizhny Novgorod (assistant)
- 2013–: FC Yenisey Krasnoyarsk (assistant)
- * Club domestic league appearances and goals

Aleksandr Nikolayevich Gostenin (Russian: Александр Николаевич Гостенин; born 29 April 1955) is a Russian professional football coach and a former player. He played 2 games for FC Torpedo Moscow in the European Cup Winners' Cup 1986–87.

== Honours ==
- Soviet Cup winner: 1986.
- Soviet Cup finalist: 1982.
