= Igor Uralyov =

Russian footballer and coach

Personal information
- Full name: Igor Yuryevich Uralyov
- Date of birth: 15 October 1966 (age 60)
- Height: 1.78 m (5 ft 10 in)
- Position: Goalkeeper

Team information
- Current team: Alania Vladikavkaz (GK coach)

Senior career*
Years	Team	Apps	(Gls)
1984–1985	FC Spartak Ordzhonikidze	1	(0)
1988	FC Uralan Elista	6	(0)
1989–1990	FC Spartak Oryol	56	(0)
1991	PFC Spartak Nalchik	25	(0)
1992–1994	FC Avtodor Vladikavkaz	81	(0)
1995–2003	FC Amkar Perm	148	(0)

Managerial career
- 2004–2006: FC Amkar Perm (assistant)
- 2006: FC Amkar Perm (caretaker)
- 2007: FC Amkar Perm (sports dept manager)
- 2008: FC Amkar Perm (reserves assistant)
- 2008: FC Amkar Perm (GK coach)
- 2009: FC Metallurg Lipetsk (GK coach)
- 2010: FC Torpedo Armavir (GK coach)
- 2011: FC Olimpia Gelendzhik (assistant)
- 2012: FC SKA-Energiya Khabarovsk (GK coach)
- 2015: FC Luch-Energiya Vladivostok (GK coach)
- 2019: FC Chayka Peschanokopskoye (GK coach)
- 2020: Aktobe (GK coach)
- 2021: Aktobe (GK coach)
- 2022: KAMAZ Naberezhnye Chelny (GK coach)
- 2022–: Alania Vladikavkaz (GK coach)
- * Club domestic league appearances and goals

Igor Yuryevich Uralyov (Russian: Игорь Юрьевич Уралёв; born 15 October 1966) is a Russian professional football coach and a former player. He is the goalkeepers' coach with Alania Vladikavkaz.
