= FC Baník Ostrava =

Association football club in the Czech Republic

Baník Ostrava
- Full name: Football Club Baník Ostrava, a.s.
- Nickname: Chachaři
- Founded: 1922; 104 years ago, as SK Slezská Ostrava
- Ground: Městský stadion, Ostrava
- Capacity: 15,123
- Chairman: Václav Brabec
- Manager: Roman Skuhravý
- League: Czech First League
- 2025–26: 15th of 16
- Website: www.fcb.cz
Home colours	Away colours	Third colours

FC Baník Ostrava is a professional football club from Ostrava in the Czech Republic. The club competes in the Czech First League, the top tier of Czech football.

Founded in 1922 as SK Slezská Ostrava, Baník has won the Czech First League once, as well as the Czechoslovak First League three times. Internationally the club won the Mitropa Cup in 1988 and the Mitropa Super Cup the following year.

== History ==
=== Formation and history to 1937 ===
Squad of SK Slezská Ostrava in 1923

First emblem of the club, drawn by Karel Aniol

The club was founded on 8 September 1922 as SK Slezská Ostrava, when 20 activists signed the establishment treaty in the U Dubu restaurant. The signatories were mostly poor coal miners from the Kamenec coal mining settlement in Ostrava. The founders were Karel Aniol, Arnošt Haberkiewicz, Petr Křižák, František Mruzek and Jaroslav Horák.

SK Slezská Ostrava was a poor club; raising money for the functioning of the club was a common concern. They didn't have their own playing field and were forced to loan fields from wealthier clubs. The first field of its own was built in autumn of 1925 at Kamenec. It was however stony and did not meet requirements of the football officials. In 1934 club activists succeeded in renting the land at Stará střelnice from regional wealthy industrialist Count Wilczek. During the summer of 1934 a new field was built there. Many workers volunteered to help with the construction for free. Workers and coal miners often came directly from shifts to build the field.

SK Slezská Ostrava began to compete with other teams in the league system in the spring of 1923. They started in the lowest division (III. třída župy) and were promoted to the higher division the same year. It took, however, some time for the club to reach the highest divisions of football in Czechoslovakia. In 1934 the club won promotion to the Moravian-Silesian Division, one of the highest leagues in the country. The promotion made SK Slezská Ostrava a popular team in the city and public interest was rising. The 1935 derby against Slovan Ostrava at Stará střelnice was watched by 5,400 spectators.

=== From 1937 to 1952 ===
The Czechoslovak First League was dominated by Prague teams at that time, which were advanced in all aspects. Promotion to the First League was, therefore, a big success for SK Slezská Ostrava. In 15 years the team advanced from being obscure minnows to the highest level of football in the country. The first league match at Stará střelnice was played on 22 August 1937 against 1. ČsŠK Bratislava. In the second match, the newcomer team faced famous Sparta Prague in Prague. Though Sparta's roster was full of national team players, Baník won 3–2 and caused an immediate sensation. SK Slezská Ostrava survived three seasons in the First League before being relegated in 1940.

SK Slezská Ostrava played at a lower level until 1943, when they were again promoted to the First League. Promotion to the highest league sparked even stronger interest for football in local people. Later, famed opera singer Rudolf Asmus even sang a new anthem for the club. In the 1943–44 season the home attendances of SK Slezská Ostrava reached the highest level so far. The match against Slavia Prague was attended by 33,000 people.

=== From 1952 to 1967 ===
In 1952 the club adopted the name DSO Baník Ostrava. Since then the name went only through slight changes. In the 1954 season, Baník achieved their biggest league success so far, finishing second in the league behind Sparta. In 1959 Baník played for the last time at the old Stará střelnice stadium. Stará střelnice did not meet the requirements set by the football association. The pitch was not grassy, but covered with slag, which was also a reason to close down the stadium. Bazaly stadium was constructed in 1959 in Slezská Ostrava, and was opened on 19 April that year.

In the 1965–66 season Baník were weakened by the generation change. They finished 13th in the league table and were relegated to the Second League. After winning the Second League in 1966–67, Baník were promoted back to the top division.

=== The Golden Era ===
In 1972–73 and 1977–78 Baník won the Czechoslovak Cup. In the 1975-76 season, the club won the Czechoslovak First League for the first time.

The team's squad was stable in the Golden Era years. The best players like Verner Lička and Rostislav Vojáček were regularly playing for the national team. Others like Libor Radimec, Zdeněk Rygel, Petr Němec and Zdeněk Šreiner played for the Olympic team. In the 1979–80 season Baník won their second Czechoslovak title, finishing five points ahead of Zbrojovka Brno. In the 1980–81 season of the UEFA European Cup Baník reached the quarter-finals, where they were knocked out by Bayern Munich. In the same season's league, Baník won the First League for the third time. For the next two seasons, Baník finished second in the league table. After the 1982–83 season, coach Hadamczik resigned, thus symbolically ending the Golden Era of the club.

=== From 1983 ===
In the following years, Baník was unable to reach the highest positions in the league. The team was undergoing another generation change and young players did not maintain their performance for the whole season. Baník however regularly appeared in the upper part of the league table. In the 1988–89 and 1989–90 seasons they finished second in the league. In 1991, Baník won the Czechoslovak Cup by beating Spartak Trnava 6–1 in the final.

In the 2003–04 season they won the Czech Republic league.

=== From 2016: the Václav Brabec era ===
In the winter break of the 2015–16 season Baník were last in the league and in financial distress. At this point the club was bought by Czech businessman Václav Brabec. They were relegated to the Czech Second League for the 2016–17 season. In the 2016–17 season they finished 2nd and started their rebuild to compete in the Czech First League for the 2017–18 season.

With no youth training facilities before the new ownership, under Václav Brabec the team began investing 150 million Kč in three facilities.

1) A partnership in 2017 with K-9 Grade School of J. Šoupal, where they have at their disposal 2 natural fields and 1 artificial field for the youth development.

2) building (expected complete early 2019) new training grounds at Vista that will enable the team to have 2 more artificial fields and 1 natural field for their youth teams.

3) The team is working with the Dvořák High School that will enable their athletes to finish a degree in sports management as well as all 20–25 individuals to train together.

Václav Brabec hired former Baník Ostrava star and home-grown player Marek Jankulovski to take over the role of Dušan Vrťo as the team's Sport Director. Jankulovski brought in a few players such as Daniel Holzer, Patrizio Stronati and Adam Jánoš for the 2018–19 season.

In the 2020–21 season Marek Jankulovski stepped down from his role to take the Chairman Board of Directors role. Milan Baroš retired. Acquisitions before the 2020–21 campaign came from FC Slovácko in Jan Juroška and Tomáš Zajíc.

== Historical names ==
- 1922 — SK Slezská Ostrava (Sport Club Slezská Ostrava)
- 1945 — SK Ostrava (Sport Club Ostrava)
- 1948 — Sokol Trojice Ostrava
- 1951 — Sokol OKD Ostrava (Sokol Ostrava-Karviná Mines Ostrava)
- 1952 — DSO Baník Ostrava (Volunteers Sport Organisation Baník Ostrava)
- 1961 — TJ Baník Ostrava (Physical Education Unit Baník Ostrava)
- 1970 — TJ Baník Ostrava OKD (Physical Education Unit Baník Ostrava Ostrava-Karviná Mines)
- 1990 — FC Baník Ostrava (Football Club Baník Ostrava, a.s.)
- 1994 — FC Baník Ostrava Tango (Football Club Baník Ostrava Tango, a.s.)
- 1995 — FC Baník Ostrava (Football Club Baník Ostrava, a.s.)
- 2003 — FC Baník Ostrava (Football Club Baník Ostrava Ispat, a.s.)
- 2005 — FC Baník Ostrava (Football Club Baník Ostrava, a.s.)

== Stadiums ==
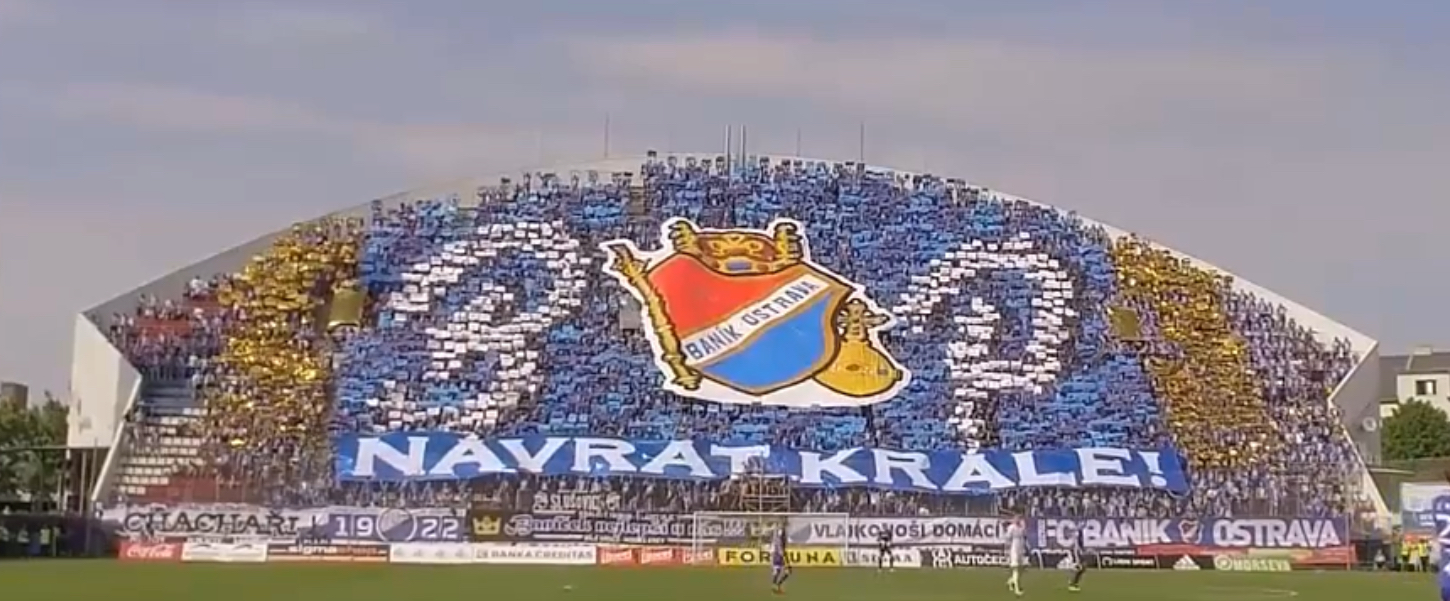
Choreography of the club supporters

In the early beginnings from 1922 to 1925, the club was without its own ground or stadium. The first ground was completed in Ostrava's miner district "Kamenec" in 1925. Banik was playing there for 9 years and moved to southern part of Silesian Ostrava near by a park "Stará střelnice" (Old Shooting range). It was a special place, because a cable car with coal was running above one of the wooden stands. That was also one of the reasons why the stadium started to fail league criteria in the early 1950s.

The club management was looking for a new place for the new stadium and found it in the area of former basalt quarry. They then started building a new stadium for more than 30,000 spectators and named it Bazaly after the basalt. It was Banik's home from 1959 to 2015 and later had a capacity of approximately 17,500 seats. Currently, Bazaly is being transformed into a youth academy that will have 5 training fields.

In 2015 the club moved to Ostrava's Městský stadion, which has a capacity of 15,275.

== Supporters ==
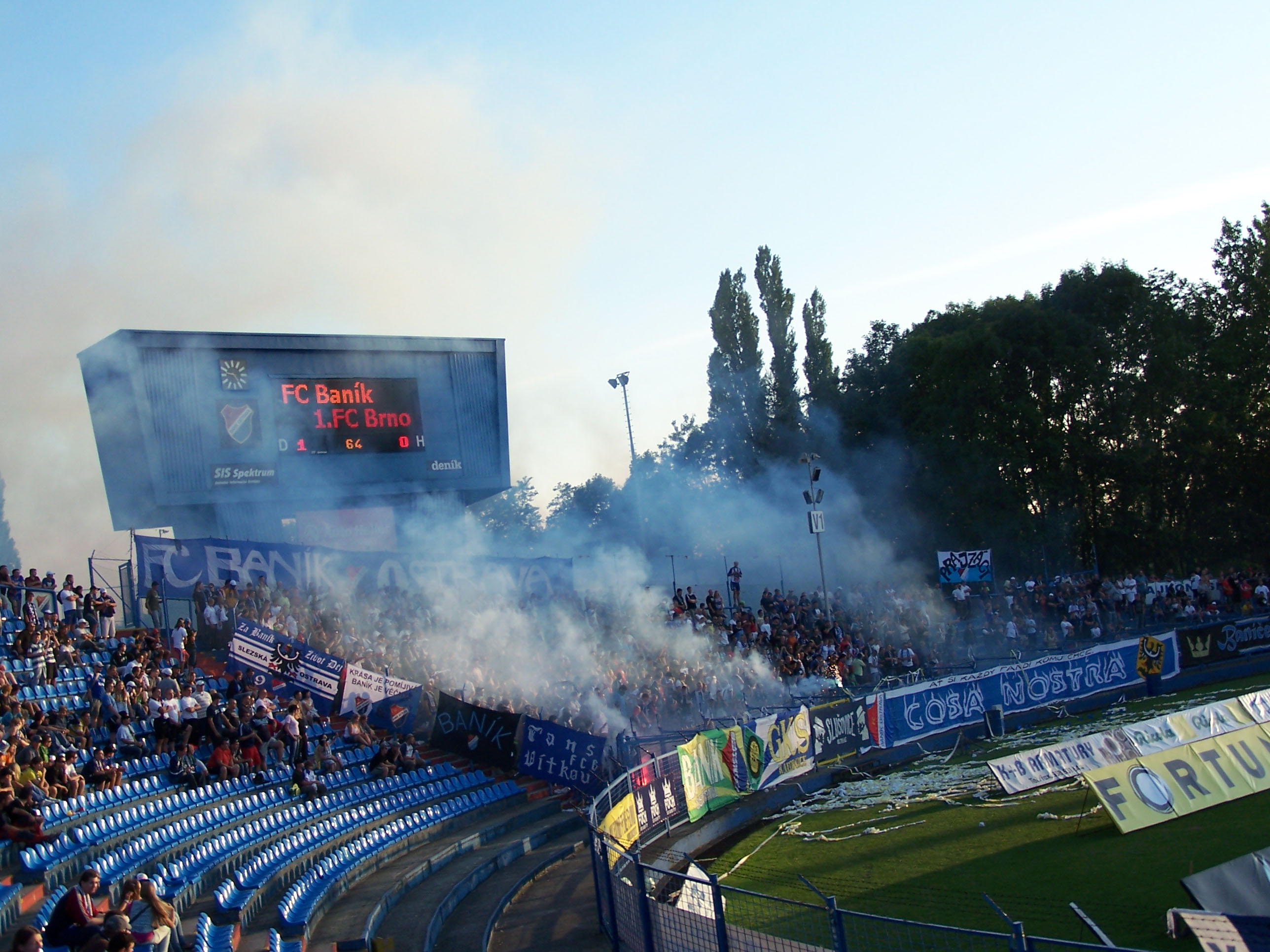
Club supporters during the home match against 1. FC Brno

In the late 2000s Baník had attendances higher than most within the Czech First League.

Ultra supporters of Baník call themselves Chachaři, which means "bad boys" in the local dialect. Some of the ultras' songs contain lyrics proudly demonstrating willingness to not only sing, but also fight for their club. Baník's ultras have made friendships over the years, and in 2006 celebrated 10 years of partnership with first league division ekstraklasa Poland club, GKS Katowice. The celebration took the form of a game between the two teams, organised by the clubs' directors. The fixture took place at GKS's stadium, where throughout the 90 minutes the opposing sets of fans sung one another's songs. At the end of the game, both sets of fans climbed over metal fences in order to race onto the pitch come the final whistle to embrace and exchange scarves.

== Players ==
=== Current squad ===
As of 8 September 2026.

Note: Flags indicate national team as defined under FIFA eligibility rules; some limited exceptions apply. Players may hold more than one non-FIFA nationality.

No.	Pos.	Nation	Player
1	GK	SVK	Viktor Budinský
3	DF	SUI	Rhodri Smith (on loan from Young Boys)
5	MF	CZE	Jiří Boula
7	MF	TTO	Dantaye Gilbert
8	DF	CIV	Aboubacar Traore
11	FW	CZE	David Látal
12	FW	SEN	Abdallah Gning
15	FW	CZE	Václav Jurečka
16	DF	UKR	Maksym Dyachuk (on loan from Dynamo Kyiv)
17	DF	CZE	Michal Frydrych
18	MF	CZE	David Planka
19	MF	CZE	Filip Šancl
21	MF	CZE	Michal Kohút
22	FW	CZE	Vít Škrkoň

No.	Pos.	Nation	Player
23	GK	CZE	Martin Jedlička
24	GK	CZE	Martin Hrubý
28	FW	CZE	Filip Kubala
34	MF	NGR	Abdullahi Bewene
37	DF	CZE	Matěj Chaluš
42	DF	CZE	Jiří Míček
44	DF	UKR	Yevheniy Skyba
55	MF	SVK	Artúr Musák
77	GK	CZE	Matouš Babka
81	DF	SVK	Matúš Kmeť
83	DF	CMR	Roan Nogha
95	MF	CZE	Daniel Holzer
99	DF	EST	Vlasiy Sinyavskiy

=== Out on loan ===
Note: Flags indicate national team as defined under FIFA eligibility rules; some limited exceptions apply. Players may hold more than one non-FIFA nationality.

No.	Pos.	Nation	Player
—	DF	COL	Pablo Ortiz (at Atlético Junior)
—	DF	CZE	Jan Harušťák (at Mladá Boleslav)
—	MF	CZE	Samuel Grygar (at Mladá Boleslav)
—	MF	CZE	Marek Havran (at Mladá Boleslav)
—	DF	CZE	Karel Pojezný (at Artis Brno)

No.	Pos.	Nation	Player
—	MF	CZE	Stanislav Petruta (at Zlín)
—	MF	FIN	Lauri Laine (at Inter Turku)
—	MF	SVK	Matúš Rusnák (at Železiarne Podbrezová)
—	FW	SVK	Jakub Pira (at Karviná)
—	MF	GER	Dennis Owusu (at Opava)

== Player records in the Czech First League ==
As of 18 September 2026.

Highlighted players are in the current squad.

=== Most appearances ===
#	Name	Matches
1	(Czech Republic) Martin Lukeš	316
2	(Czech Republic) René Bolf	235
3	(Czech Republic) Jan Laštůvka	231
4	(Czech Republic) Radek Slončík	214
5	(Czech Republic) Daniel Holzer	210
6	(Czech Republic) Michal Frydrych	192
7	(Czech Republic) Martin Čížek	187
8	(Czech Republic) David Bystroň	183
9	(Czech Republic) David Buchta	175
10	(Czech Republic) Jiří Fleišman	168

=== Most goals ===
#	Name	Goals
1	(Czech Republic) Milan Baroš	45
2	(Czech Republic) Martin Lukeš	42
2	(Czech Republic) Václav Svěrkoš	42
4	(Czech Republic) Petr Samec	27
4	(Czech Republic) Martin Čížek	27
4	(Brazil) Ewerton	27
4	(Czech Republic) David Buchta	27
8	(Slovakia) Ladislav Almási	26
9	(Czech Republic) Mario Lička	25
10	(Czech Republic) René Bolf	24
10	(Czech Republic) Lukáš Magera	24
10	(Serbia) Nemanja Kuzmanović	24

=== Most clean sheets ===
#	Name	Clean sheets
1	(Czech Republic) Jan Laštůvka	74
2	(Czech Republic) Vít Baránek	46
3	(Czech Republic) Petr Vašek	31

== Managers ==
- Glass (1923–1935)
- Karel Nenál (Feb 1936 – Sep 1936)
- Karel Böhm (Sep 1936 – Feb 1937)
- Karel Hromadník (Feb 1937 – Sep 1937)
- Ladislav Holeček (Oct 1937 – Dec 1937)
- Vilém Lugr (Jan 1938)
- Karel Böhm (Jan 1938 – Mar 1938)
- Karel Texa (Mar 1938 – Apr 1938)
- Karel Böhm (Apr 1938 – Jun 1938)
- Zdeněk Stefflik (Jul 1938 – Jun 1939)
- Antonín Křišťál (Jun 1939 – Jan 1940)
- Karel Böhm (Jan 1940 – May 1941)
- Evžen Šenovský (May 1941 – Aug 1941)
- Antonín Rumler (Aug 1941 – Aug 1942)
- Václav Horák (Sep 1942 – Aug 1943)
- František Jurek (Aug 1943 – Aug 1945)
- František Bělík (Sep 1945 – Feb 1946)
- František Kuchta (Feb 1946 – Jun 1946)
- Josef Kuchynka (Jun 1946 – Mar 1948)
- Jan Gavač (Mar 1948 – May 1948)
- Václav Horák (May 1948 – Jan 1949)
- Miroslav Bartoš (Jan 1949 – Oct 1949)
- František Bičiště (Oct 1949 – Sep 1950)
- Jaroslav Šimonek (Sep 1950 – Feb 1951)
- Rudolf Vytlačil (Mar 1951 – Jan 1952)
- Bedřich Šafl (Feb 1952 – Nov 1952)
- Jaroslav Šimonek (Dec 1952 – Feb 1956)
- František Szedlacsek (Feb 1956 – Apr 1957)
- Antonín Honál (Apr 1957 – May 1957)
- František Bičiště (Jun 1957 – Jun 1958)
- Jaroslav Vejvoda (Jul 1958 – Jul 1960)
- František Bufka (Aug 1960 – Dec 1964)
- Zdeněk Šajer (Jan 1965 – Dec 1965)
- František Bičiště (Jan 1966 – Jun 1966)
- Jiří Křižák (Jul 1966 – Dec 1966)
- Jozef Čurgaly (Jan 1967 – Jul 1967)
- Oldřich Šubrt (Jul 1967 – Aug 1969)
- Jiří Rubáš (Aug 1969 – Jun 1970)
- František Ipser (Jul 1970 – Aug 1971)
- Zdeněk Stanco (Aug 1971 – Dec 1971)
- Karol Bučko (Jan 1972 – Aug 1972)
- František Šindelář (Aug 1972 – Oct 1972)
- Tomáš Pospíchal (Oct 1972 – Dec 1975)
- Jiří Rubáš (Jan 1976 – Dec 1977)
- Evžen Hadamczik (Jan 1978 – Jun 1983)
- Stanislav Jarábek (Jul 1983 – Jun 1984)
- Josef Kolečko (Jul 1984 – Jun 1986)
- Milan Máčala (Jul 1986 – Jun 1990)
- Jaroslav Gürtler (Jul 1990 – Jun 1992)
- Ivan Kopecký (Jul 1992 – Nov 1992)
- Jaroslav Janoš (Nov 1992 – Dec 1992)
- Verner Lička (Dec 1992 – Apr 1995)
- Jaroslav Janoš (Apr 1995 – Jun 1995)
- Ján Zachar (Jul 1995)
- Jaroslav Jánoš (Jul 1995 – Aug 1995)
- Ján Zachar (Sep 1995 – Jul 1996)
- Petr Uličný (Jul 1996 – Sep 1997)
- Verner Lička (Sep 1997 – Mar 2000)
- Rostislav Vojáček (Mar 2000 – Jun 2000)
- Milan Bokša (Jul 2000 – Nov 2000)
- Jaroslav Gürtler (Nov 2000 – Apr 2001)
- Verner Lička (May 2001)
- Jozef Jarabinský (Jun 2001 – May 2002)
- Erich Cviertna (Jun 2002 – Apr 2003)
- Pavel Vrba (May 2003)
- František Komňacký (Jun 2003 – Oct 2004)
- Jozef Jarabinský (Oct 2004 – Aug 2005)
- Pavel Hapal (Aug 2005 – Jun 2006)
- Karel Večeřa (Jul 2006 – Apr 2009)
- Verner Lička (interim) (Apr 2009 – Jun 2009)
- Miroslav Koubek (Jun 2009 – Oct 2010)
- Verner Lička (Oct 2010 – Nov 2010)
- Karol Marko (Nov 2010 – Jul 2011)
- Pavel Malura (Jul 2011 – Mar 2012)
- Radoslav Látal (Mar 2012 – Oct 2012)
- Martin Pulpit (Oct 2012 – May 2013)
- Martin Svědík (May 2013 – Dec 2013)
- František Komňacký (Dec 2013 – Apr 2014)
- Tomáš Bernady (Apr 2014 – Dec 2014)
- Petr Frňka (Dec 2014 – Jun 2015)
- Radomír Korytář (Jun 2015 – Jan 2016)
- Vlastimil Petržela (Jan 2016 – May 2017)
- Radim Kučera (Jun 2017 – Mar 2018)
- Bohumil Páník (Mar 2018 – Dec 2019)
- Luboš Kozel (Dec 2019 – Feb 2021)
- Ondřej Smetana (Feb 2021 – Apr 2022)
- Tomáš Galásek (Apr 2022 – Jun 2022 )
- Pavel Vrba (Jul 2022 – Oct 2022)
- Pavel Hapal (Oct 2022 – Oct 2025)
- Tomáš Galásek (Oct 2025 – Feb 2026)
- Ondřej Smetana (Feb 2026 – Apr 2026)
- Josef Dvorník (Apr 2026 – June 2026)
- Roman Skuhravý (June 2026 – present)

== History in domestic competitions ==
- 1993–2016 Czech First League
- 2016–2017 Czech 2. Liga
- 2017– Czech First League

- Seasons spent at Level 1 of the football league system: 31
- Seasons spent at Level 2 of the football league system: 1
- Seasons spent at Level 3 of the football league system: 0
- Seasons spent at Level 4 of the football league system: 0

=== Czech Republic ===
Season	League	Placed	Pld	W	D	L	GF	GA	GD	Pts	Cup
1993–94	1. liga	3rd	30	14	8	8	52	25	+27	36	Semi-finals
1994–95	1. liga	11th	30	10	8	12	36	41	–5	38	Quarter-finals
1995–96	1. liga	12th	30	10	5	15	40	46	–6	35	Round of 16
1996–97	1. liga	10th	30	8	13	9	33	35	–2	37	Semi-finals
1997–98	1. liga	4th	30	13	11	6	51	35	+16	50	Quarter-finals
1998–99	1. liga	5th	30	10	15	5	39	26	+13	45	Quarter-finals
1999–00	1. liga	11th	30	8	11	11	43	45	–2	35	Round of 32
2000–01	1. liga	14th	30	7	9	14	28	45	–17	30	Quarter-finals
2001–02	1. liga	6th	30	12	8	10	43	36	+7	44	Semi-finals
2002–03	1. liga	5th	30	13	6	11	41	38	+3	45	Quarter-finals
2003–04	1. liga	1st	30	18	9	3	60	25	+35	63	Runners-up
2004–05	1. liga	7th	30	9	10	11	33	36	–3	37	Winners
2005–06	1. liga	6th	30	10	10	10	35	32	+3	40	Runners-up
2006–07	1. liga	7th	30	12	10	8	43	33	+10	46	Round of 16
2007–08	1. liga	3rd	30	15	10	5	51	28	+23	55	Round of 64
2008–09	1. liga	9th	30	11	6	13	38	36	+2	39	Quarter-finals
2009–10	1. liga	3rd	30	17	9	4	47	25	+22	60	Round of 16
2010–11	1. liga	14th	30	7	9	14	31	46	–15	30	Round of 64
2011–12	1. liga	14th	30	7	7	16	31	48	–17	28	Quarter-finals
2012–13	1. liga	14th	30	7	8	15	34	44	–10	29	Round of 32
2013–14	1. liga	10th	30	8	11	11	33	43	–10	35	Round of 32
2014–15	1. liga	14th	30	8	9	13	23	41	–18	33	Round of 16
2015–16	1. liga	16th	30	4	2	24	27	65	−38	14	Round of 64
2016–17	2. liga	2nd	30	18	10	2	48	20	+28	64	Round of 32
2017–18	1. liga	13th	30	7	10	13	36	43	–7	31	Quarter-finals
2018–19	1. liga	5th	36	13	8	15	39	44	–5	47	Runners-up
2019–20	1. liga	6th	35	12	11	12	47	43	+4	47	Quarter-finals
2020–21	1. liga	8th	34	13	10	11	48	38	+10	49	Round of 16
2021–22	1. liga	5th	35	15	10	10	59	47	+12	55	Round of 16
2022–23	1. liga	11th	35	11	9	15	53	50	+3	42	Round of 16
2023–24	1. liga	4th	35	14	7	14	56	48	+8	49	Round of 16
2024–25	1. liga	3rd	35	22	5	8	58	34	+24	71	Semi-finals
2025–26	1. liga	15th	35	7	8	20	32	49	–17	29	Semi-finals

== History in European competitions since 1993–94 ==
Season	Competition	Round	Opponent	Home	Away	Aggregate
2004–05	UEFA Champions League	3Q	(Germany) Bayer Leverkusen	2–1	0–5	2–6
2004–05	UEFA Cup	1R	(England) Middlesbrough	1–1	0–3	1–4
2005–06	UEFA Cup	1R	(Netherlands) SC Heerenveen	2–0	0–5	2–5
2008–09	UEFA Cup	3Q	(Russia) Spartak Moscow	0–1	1–1	1–2
2010–11	UEFA Europa League	2Q	(Georgia (country)) FC WIT Georgia	0–0	6–0	6–0
2010–11	UEFA Europa League	3Q	(Belarus) Dnepr Mogilev	1–2	0–1	1–3
2024–25	UEFA Conference League	2Q	(Armenia) Urartu	5–1	2–0	7–1
2024–25	UEFA Conference League	3Q	(Denmark) Copenhagen	1–0	0–1	1–1 (1–2 p)
2025–26	UEFA Europa League	2Q	(Poland) Legia Warsaw	2–2	1–2	3–4
2025–26	UEFA Conference League	3Q	Austria Wien	4–3	1–1	5–4
2025–26	UEFA Conference League	PO	(Slovenia) Celje	0–2	0–1	0–3

== Honours ==
=== Domestic ===
- Czechoslovak First League / Czech First League
  - Champions (4): 1975–76, 1979–80, 1980–81, 2003–04
  - Runners-up (6): 1954, 1978–79, 1981–82, 1982–83, 1988–89, 1989–90
- Czechoslovak Cup / Czech Cup
  - Winners (4): 1972–73, 1977–78, 1990–91, 2004–05
  - Runners-up (4): 1978–79, 2003–04, 2005–06, 2018–19

=== European ===
- Mitropa Cup
  - Winners: 1988
- Mitropa Super Cup
  - Winners: 1989

== Club records ==
=== Czech First League records ===
- Best position: 1st (2003–04)
- Worst position: 16th (2015–16)
- Biggest home win: Ostrava 6–0 Plzeň (2005–06), Ostrava 6–0 Slovácko (2023–24)
- Biggest away win: Teplice 0–5 Ostrava (2022–23)
- Biggest home defeat: Ostrava 1–5 Sparta (2000–01), Ostrava 0–4 Liberec (2004–05), Ostrava 0–4 Jablonec (2013–14), Ostrava 0–4 Plzeň (2015–16)
- Biggest away defeat: Slavia 7–0 Ostrava (2002–03)
