= Vladimír Borovička =

Czech footballer and coach

Personal information
- Full name: Vladimír Borovička
- Date of birth: 25 March 1954 (age 72)
- Place of birth: Děčín, Czechoslovakia
- Position: Goalkeeper

Senior career*
Years	Team	Apps	(Gls)
1974–1976	Kovo Děčín		
1976–1980	Bohemians Praha	29	(0)
1980	Dukla Banská Bystrica	24	(0)
1980–1986	Bohemians Praha	73	(0)
1986–1988	Austria Wien	0	(0)
1988–1992	Zwettl		

International career
1984–1985	Czechoslovakia	4	(0)

Managerial career
- 1992–1994: Sparta Praha (coach)
- 1994: Sparta Praha (caretaker)
- 1994–1996: Sparta Praha (coach)
- 1996–2002: Bohemians Praha (coach)
- 2002: Bohemians Praha (caretaker)
- 2002: Bohemians Praha
- 2003–2006: Zenit St. Petersburg (assistant mgr.)
- 2006: Zenit St. Petersburg (caretaker)
- 2006–2012: Zenit St. Petersburg (scout)
- * Club domestic league appearances and goals

Vladimír Borovička (born 25 March 1954 in Děčín) is a former professional footballer and a Czech football coach.

== Playing career ==
Borovička played as a goalkeeper. He played for Bohemians Prague and Dukla Banská Bystrica in the Czechoslovak league.

== Coaching career ==
Borovička worked as a Zenit St. Petersburg's caretaking manager in May 2006 after the departure of the fellow Czech Vlastimil Petržela. He since returned to his coaching duties.
