= Boris Gavrilov (footballer) =

Russian footballer and coach

Personal information
- Full name: Boris Anatolyevich Gavrilov
- Date of birth: 12 March 1952 (age 74)
- Place of birth: Gavrilov-Yam, Russian SFSR
- Height: 1.71 m (5 ft 7 1/2 in)
- Positions: Striker; midfielder

Senior career*
Years	Team	Apps	(Gls)
1971–1989	FC Shinnik Yaroslavl	575	(83)

Managerial career
- 1989–1992: FC Shinnik Yaroslavl (assistant)
- 2006: FC Shinnik Yaroslavl (caretaker)
- * Club domestic league appearances and goals

Boris Anatolyevich Gavrilov (Russian: Борис Анатольевич Гаврилов; born 12 March 1952) is a Russian professional football coach and a former player.

== Career ==
Born in Gavrilov-Yam, Gavrilov began playing professional football with local side FC Shinnik Yaroslavl. He spent his entire footballing career with Shinnik Yaroslavl, playing until age 38. After he retired, Gavrilov coached for Shinnik.
