= Siska (surname) =

Siska or Šiška (Czech/Slovak feminine: Šišková) is a surname with multiple origins. The Czech/Slovak surname means conifer cone and is a cognate of Polish Szyszka and Ukrainian Shyshka (Ukrainian: Шишка). The same surname appears as Siska in Hungary.

== People ==
=== Siska or Šiška ===
- Adam T. Siska, American musician
- Alois Šiška (1914–2003), Czech pilot
- Anna Šišková (born 1960), Slovak actress
- Anna Sisková (born 2001), Czech tennis player
- Indrek Siska (born 1984), Estonian beach soccer player
- Juraj Šiška (born 1996), Slovak ice hockey player
- Kateřina Sisková (born 1974), Czech tennis player
- Katrin Siska (born 1983), Estonian musician
- Petr Šiška (born 1965), Czech TV presenter and musician
- Thato Siska, Botswana footballer
- Xénia Siska (1957), Hungarian athlete

=== Szyszka or Shyshka ===
- Mariusz Szyszka (born 1988), Polish footballer
- Mykhaylo Shyshka (born 1994), Ukrainian footballer
