= Adam Wawrosz =

Polish poet, writer, and activist

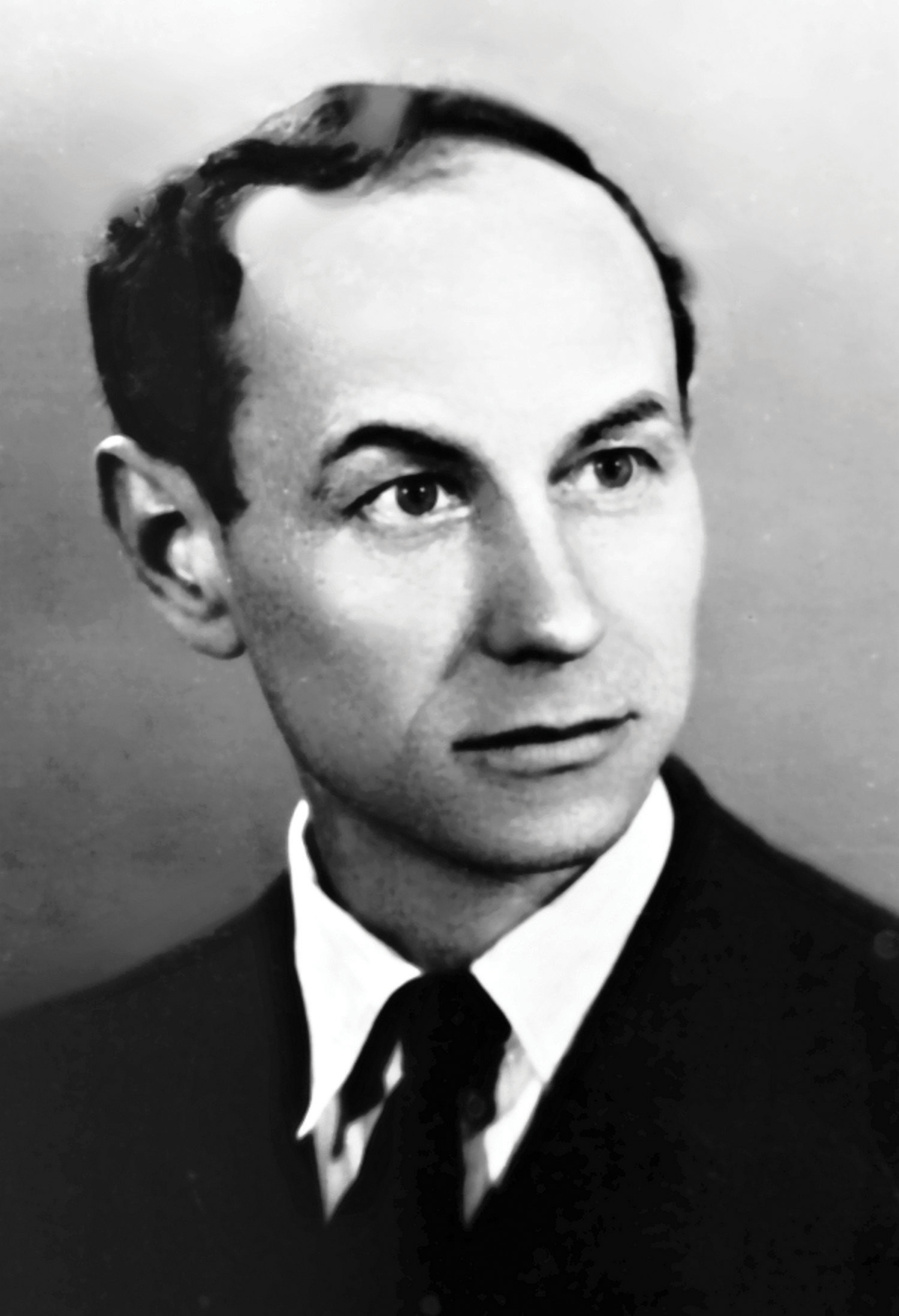
- Born: 24 December 1913; Końska, Austria-Hungary
- Died: 18 December 1971 (aged 57); Třinec, Czechoslovakia
- Citizenship: Czechoslovak
- Occupations: Poet, writer
- Writing career
- Language: Polish, Cieszyn Silesian dialect

Adam Wawrosz (24 December 1913 – 18 December 1971) was a Polish Czech poet, writer, and activist from the Trans-Olza region of Czechoslovakia. He is considered the most important writer of the folk literature of Cieszyn Silesia.

== Biography ==
Wawrosz was born in the village of Końska (now part of Třinec) to a tailor's family as the youngest of nine children. His father died in World War I and his mother was left with seven children. After the death of his father Wawrosz was raised in the village of Tyra, where he also attended local Polish primary school. Wawrosz later graduated from a course for tailors in Horní Suchá, and from a course in puppetry in Senieji Trakai.

After the outbreak of World War II Wawrosz volunteered in the Polish Army and fought in the Independent Operational Group Polesie of general Franciszek Kleeberg in the battle of Kock in October 1939. He was later jailed by Nazis and subsequently incarcerated in Gross-Born, Sachsenhausen and Dachau concentration camps. After World War II he worked in Třinec Iron and Steel Works. Wawrosz was an active member of the Polish Cultural and Educational Union and in 1958–1962 was an artistic director of its Puppet Theatre "Bajka".

Wawrosz wrote in literary Polish and Cieszyn Silesian dialect. Texts written in dialect form a backbone of his works. The ones written in literary Polish are mostly documentary in character, as some of them were written in concentration camps. The ones written in dialect focus on the life of ordinary people of Cieszyn Silesia, their life, culture and traditions. Wawrosz wrote poetry, prose and also plays for amateur theatres.

Wawrosz's poetry from the concentration camps can be seen for example in the poem Lato (Summer) from Niezapominajki (Forget-me-nots) poetry collection.

== Works ==
- Niezapominajki (1954, 1968) – poetry collection
- Na śćmiywku (1959) – prose
- Z naszej nolepy (1969) – prose
- Z Adamowej dzichty (1977) – posthumous selection of his poetic and prosaic works
