= Staré Město (Třinec) =

- Municipal part of Třinec
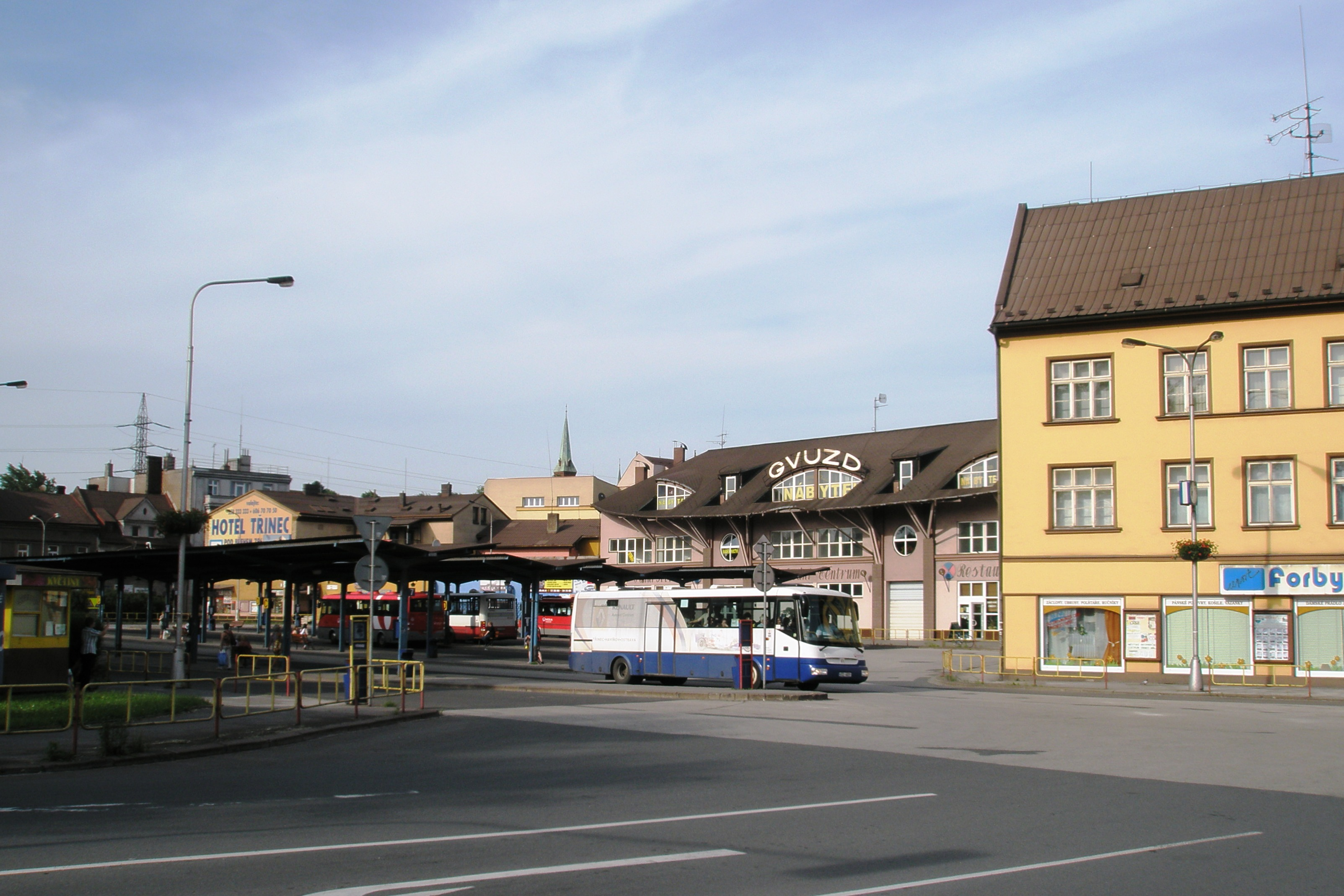
- Main bus station
- Interactive map of Staré Město
- Coordinates: 49°40′39″N 18°40′15″E
- Country: Czech Republic
- Region: Moravian-Silesian
- District: Frýdek-Místek
- Municipality: Třinec

Area
  - Total: 6.78 km^{2} (2.62 sq mi)

Population (2021)
  - Total: 4,797
  - Density: 708/km^{2} (1,830/sq mi)
- Time zone: UTC+1 (CET)
  - Summer (DST): UTC+2 (CEST)
- Postal code: 738 01, 739 61

Staré Město (Polish: Stare Miasto, lit. "Old Town") is a municipal part of the city of Třinec in Frýdek-Místek District, Moravian-Silesian Region, Czech Republic. It is the historical centre of the town. It lies in the historical region of Cieszyn Silesia and has about 4,800 inhabitants.

Staré Město is a place where the main urban settlement grew alongside Třinec Iron and Steel Works from the 19th century up to World War II. In 1946 merged with the town was the village of Lyžbice where in the 1950s the ruling Communist Party of Czechoslovakia began a large scale development in the style of socialist realism. Afterwards Lyžbice became a new downtown, overtaking the role from Staré Město.

== Demographics ==
Historical population

Year	Pop.	±%
1869	642	—
1880	1,792	+179.1%
1890	2,291	+27.8%
1900	3,214	+40.3%
1910	3,849	+19.8%
1921	5,995	+55.8%
1930	6,128	+2.2%
1950	7,157	+16.8%

Year	Pop.	±%
1961	8,864	+23.9%
1970	5,958	−32.8%
1980	5,738	−3.7%
1991	5,866	+2.2%
2001	5,909	+0.7%
2011	5,221	−11.6%
2021	4,797	−8.1%

Source: Censuses
