= Stanisław Zahradnik =

Polish historian (1932–2023)

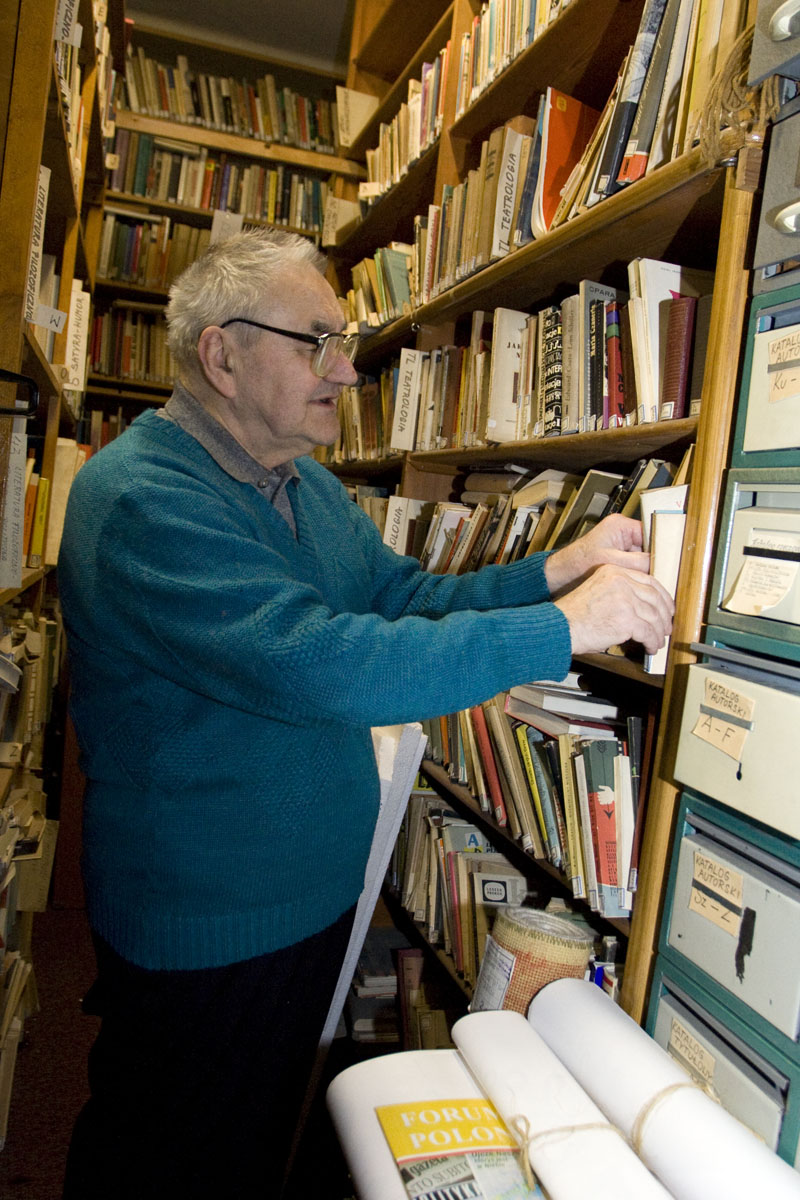
Zahradnik in archive

Stanisław Zahradnik (26 April 1932 – 5 November 2023) was a Polish Czech historian. He specialised in the history of Cieszyn Silesia and the region of Trans-Olza.

== Biography ==
Zahradnik was born on 26 April 1932 in Kojkovice. He graduated from the Juliusz Słowacki Polish Gymnasium in Český Těšín in 1951. Two years later he graduated from the Faculty of History at the Charles University in Prague. In 1968 he earned his doctorate at the same university. Afterwards he moved back to his native Třinec where he was employed as the head of the archive of the Třinec Iron and Steel Works until 1992, when he retired. Zahradnik died on 5 November 2023, at the age of 91.

== Books ==
- Třinecké železárny: období báňské a hutní společnosti: 1906–1938 (1969)
- Zaolziańskie ofiary okupacji hitlerowskiej (1988)
- Czasopiśmiennictwo w języku polskim na terenach Czechosłowacji w latach 1848–1938 (1989)
- Struktura narodowościowa Zaolzia na podstawie spisów ludności: 1880–1991 (1991)
- Korzenie Zaolzia (1992, with Marek Ryczkowski)
- Polacy na Zaolziu w historii, statystyce i dokumentach (1995)
- Trzyniec. Kompendium wiedzy o mieście i hucie (2017)
