= Tadeusz Kraus =

Czech footballer (1932–2018)

Personal information
- Date of birth: 22 October 1932
- Place of birth: Třinec, Czechoslovakia
- Date of death: 30 October 2018 (aged 86)
- Height: 1.70 m (5 ft 7 in)
- Position: Forward

Youth career
- 1942–1948: Siła Trzyniec

Senior career*
Years	Team	Apps	(Gls)
1948–1951	Siła Trzyniec		
1953–1955	Křídla vlasti Olomouc		
1955	ÚDA Praha		
1956–1966	Sparta Prague	202	(65)
1966–1969	LIAZ Jablonec nad Nisou		

International career
1953–1959	Czechoslovakia	23	(6)

Managerial career
- 1969–1970: Slavia Melbourne
- 1971–1974: Sparta Prague
- 1974–1976: LIAZ Jablonec nad Nisou
- 1976–1980: Aris Limassol
- 1983–1985: Aris Limassol
- * Club domestic league appearances and goals

Tadeusz Kraus (22 October 1932 – 30 October 2018), also known as Tadeáš Kraus, was a Czechoslovak international footballer who played as a forward. He represented Czechoslovakia.

== Career ==
Kraus was born in Třinec. His father Wilhelm was a metallurgist worker in Třinec Iron and Steel Works and also a footballer and activist in Siła Trzyniec, local Polish sport club. Tadeusz Kraus' wife Anna was a skilled gymnast who finished fourth at the 1956 Olympic Games.

He was raised in football by the Siła Trzyniec. In 1951 he left the club and went to the university in Prague. He played for several clubs and from 1955 played for Dukla Prague. A year later, Kraus joined Sparta Prague where he played for another 10 years, four as captain of the team. He then played for several other minor clubs and in 1971 started coaching. In the 1970s and 1980s coached Cypriot club Aris Limassol for six years.

Kraus was of Polish ethnicity. He played for Czechoslovakia national team (scoring 6 goals in 23 matches) and was a participant at the two World Cups, 1954 FIFA World Cup and 1958 FIFA World Cup.

== Death ==
Kraus was the last surviving member of Czechoslovakia's 1954 World Cup squad. He died on 30 October 2018, at the age of 86.
