= Siska =

Siska or Šiška may refer to:

Places

- Šiška, a city quarter of Ljubliana
- Siska, British Columbia, an unincorporated community and First Nations reserve in the Fraser Canyon of British Columbia, Canada
  - Siska First Nation, a government of the Nlaka'pamux peoples at Siska, British Columbia

Other

- Siska (surname)
- Siska (film), a 1962 Swedish film directed by Alf Kjellin
- Siska (TV series), a German TV series
- Siska, the name of Rolly Tasker's five yachts
