= Roman Sikora =

Czech theater reviewer, playwright and publicist

Roman Sikora (born 3 July 1970 in Třinec) is a contemporary Czech playwright and journalist.

== Biography ==
He grew up in the town of Třinec in eastern Czech Republic where he worked in the local steel plant, Třinec Iron and Steel Works before moving to Brno. Here he went on to graduate from the Drama Department of Brno's renowned Janáček's Academy of Performing Arts (JAMU), his field of study being drama literary management. He later worked as the night receptionist in the Brno City Theatre where he continued in his efforts to move closer to the practice of theatre operations. He was a member of the editorial board of the former internet theatrical magazine of eternal fury YORICK and the author of essays and reviews published in the same periodical. He currently lives in Prague working as an editor for the 'Literární noviny', Prague's cultural/political journal as well as working as a theatrical editor for the internet server Tiscali.cz.

His play 'Smetení Antigony' (The Detritus of Antigone) was awarded the second prize in the Alfréd Radok Foundation competition for original drama in 1997. Some of his plays have been translated into other languages, mainly German, French, Hungarian and Slovene.

In 2007 a film portrayal of the playwright was made, called "Sikora. Malý osobní marketingový epos" (Sikora. A small personal marketing epic). The film was directed by Ivo Bystřičan.

== Plays ==
- Kočka na mráčku (1994), (The Cat on the Cloud)
- Sodomagomora! (1995), (Sodomgomorrah)
- Černá noc (1996), (Black Night)
- Tank (1996), (The Tank)
- Vlci (1997), (Wolves)
- Smetení Antigony (1997), (The Detritus of Antigone)
- Krásná hra s jarními květy (1997), (The Beautiful Play with Spring Flowers)
- Sibir (1997)
- Nehybnost (1998), (Immobility)
- Opory společnosti (2000), (Pillars of Society)
- Včera to spustili (2002)
- Jitro kouzelníků (2003)
- Největší básník (2004)
- Kolchida (2006)
