= Kojkovice =

Coordinates: 49°42′0″N 18°40′57″E

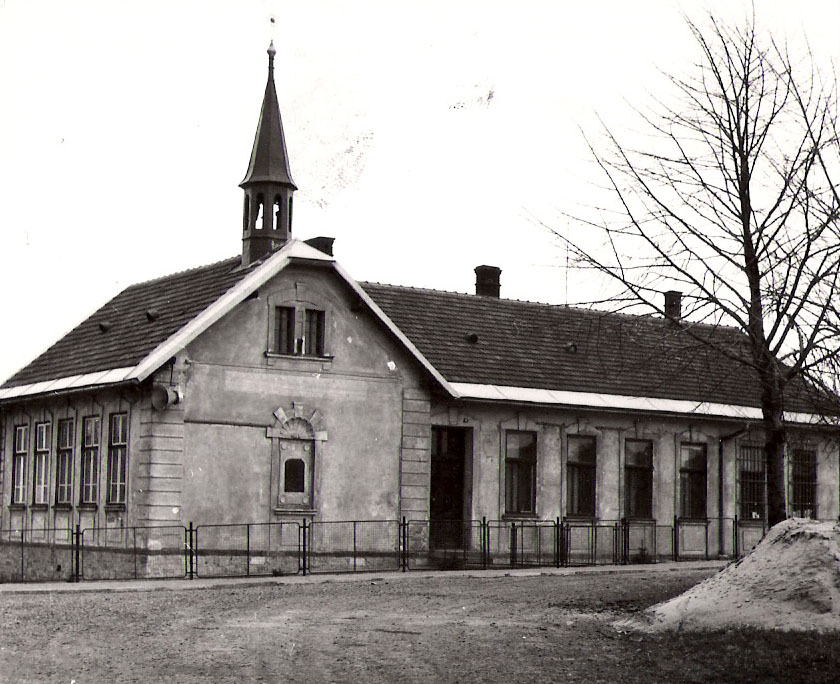
Polish school in the 1960s when it was already closed.

Kojkovice (Polish: Kojkowice) is a village in Frýdek-Místek District, Moravian-Silesian Region, Czech Republic, on the border with Poland. It was a separate municipality but became administratively a part of Třinec (Trzyniec) in 1960. It lies in the historical region of Cieszyn Silesia and has a population of 287 (1 January 2008).

The name is patronymic in origin derived from personal name Kojek.

== History ==
The village was first mentioned in 1457 as Koykowicze. Politically it belonged then to the Duchy of Teschen, formed in 1290 in the process of feudal fragmentation of Poland and was ruled by a local branch of Piast dynasty. In 1327 the duchy became a fee of the Kingdom of Bohemia, which after 1526 became part of the Habsburg monarchy.

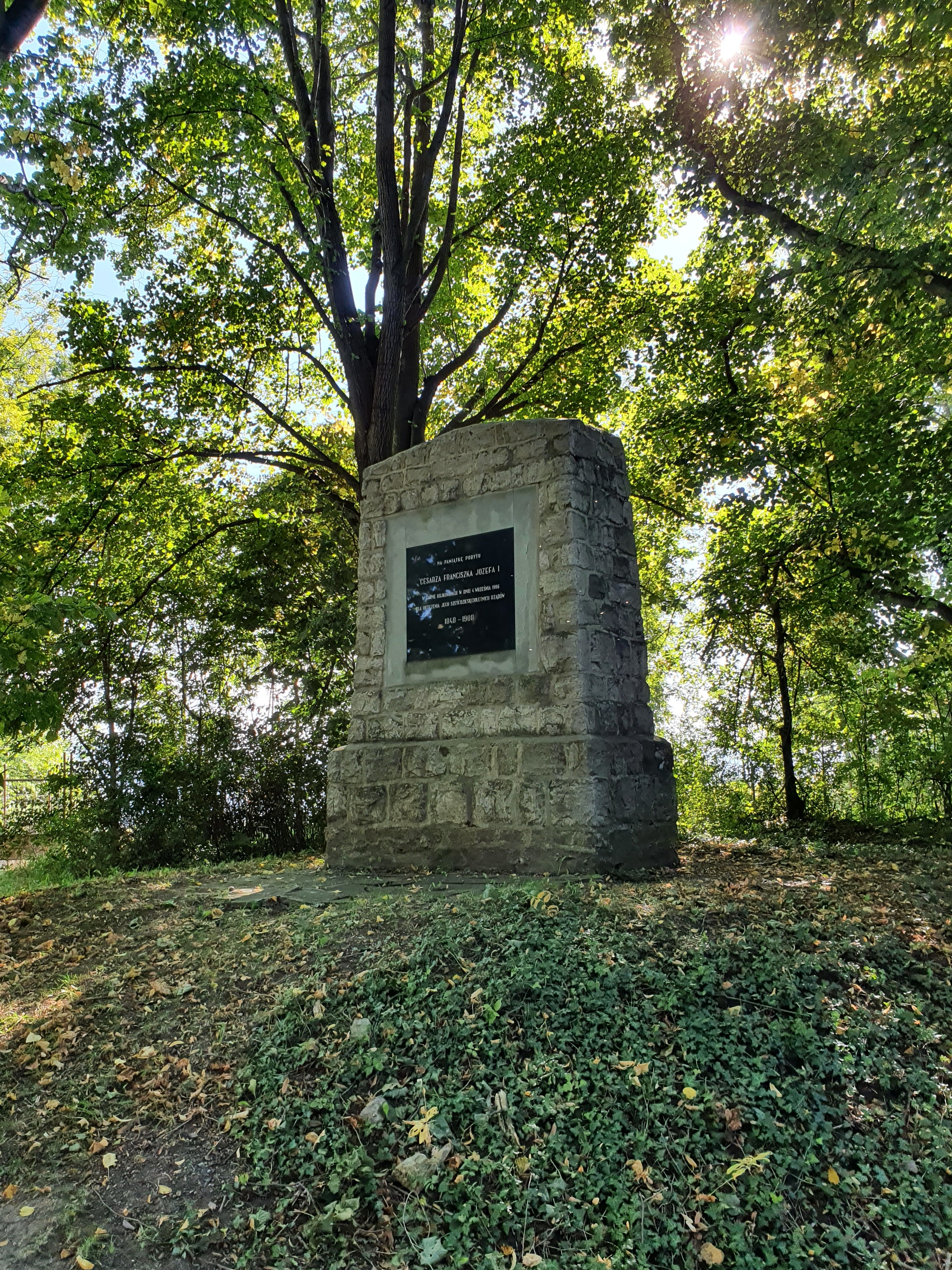
Imperial monument in Kojkovice from 1908

After Revolutions of 1848 in the Austrian Empire a modern municipal division was introduced in the re-established Austrian Silesia. The village as a municipality was subscribed to the political and legal district of Cieszyn. According to the censuses conducted in 1880, 1890, 1900 and 1910 the population of the municipality grew from 249 in 1880 to 274 in 1910 with a majority being native Polish-speakers (99.3%-100%) in 1900 accompanied by 2 Czech-speaking people. In terms of religion in 1910 majority were Protestants (78.8%), followed by Roman Catholics (20.8%). The village was also traditionally inhabited by Cieszyn Vlachs, speaking Cieszyn Silesian dialect.

There wasn't a school in the village and local children were forced to attend schools in surrounding villages, mostly in Puńców. Number of children rose and economic situation of the village improved, so in 1902 local villagers decided to build their own school. It was finished in 1907 and served local community since that year. It was naturally a Polish school as at that time Kojkowice was ethnically 100% Polish. It served 54 years and was closed in 1961 due to the lack of children.

After World War I, fall of Austria-Hungary, Polish–Czechoslovak War and the division of Cieszyn Silesia in 1920, it became a part of Czechoslovakia. Following the Munich Agreement, in October 1938 together with the Zaolzie region it was annexed by Poland, administratively adjoined to Cieszyn County of Silesian Voivodeship. It was then annexed by Nazi Germany at the beginning of World War II. After the war it was restored to Czechoslovakia.

Czech school in Kojkovice was built in 1932 and was one of the last Czech schools built in Zaolzie at that time. It was closed in 1961 also due to the lack of children.

== People ==
Polish historian Stanisław Zahradnik was born here.

== See also ==
- Polish minority in the Czech Republic
