= Guty (Třinec) =

- cadastral area in the Czech Republic, municipal part of the Czech Republic
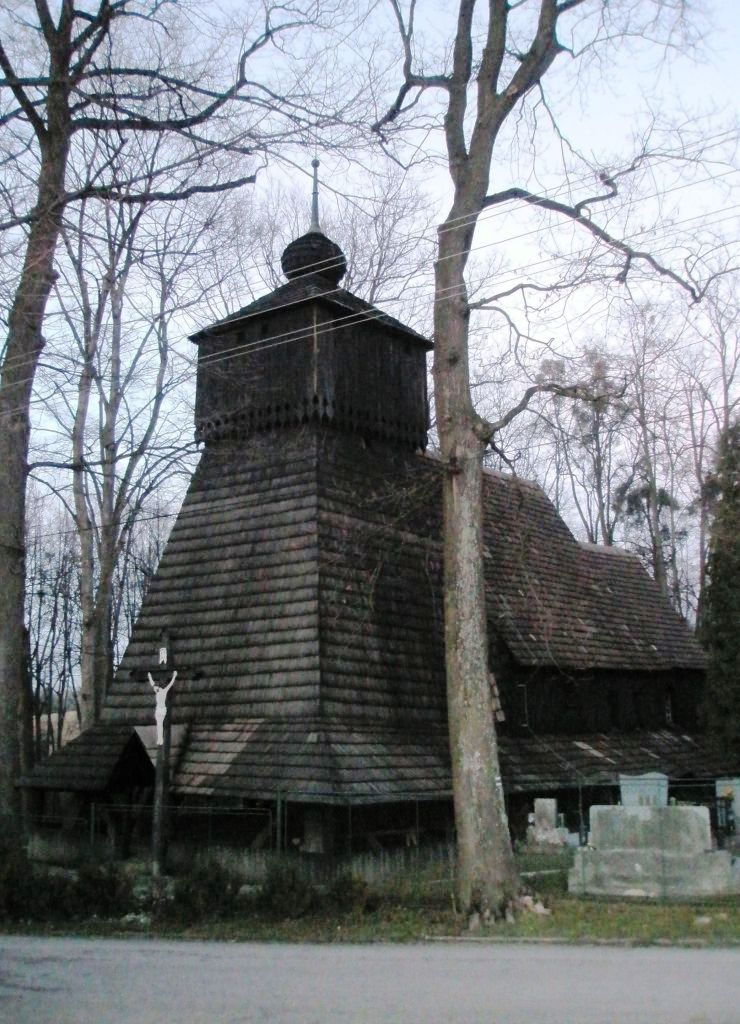

- Coordinates: 49°38′58″N 18°35′46″E
- Country: Czech Republic

Area
  - Total: 9.466 km^{2} (3.655 sq mi)

Population (26 March 2021)
  - Total: 836
  - Density: 88/km^{2} (230/sq mi)

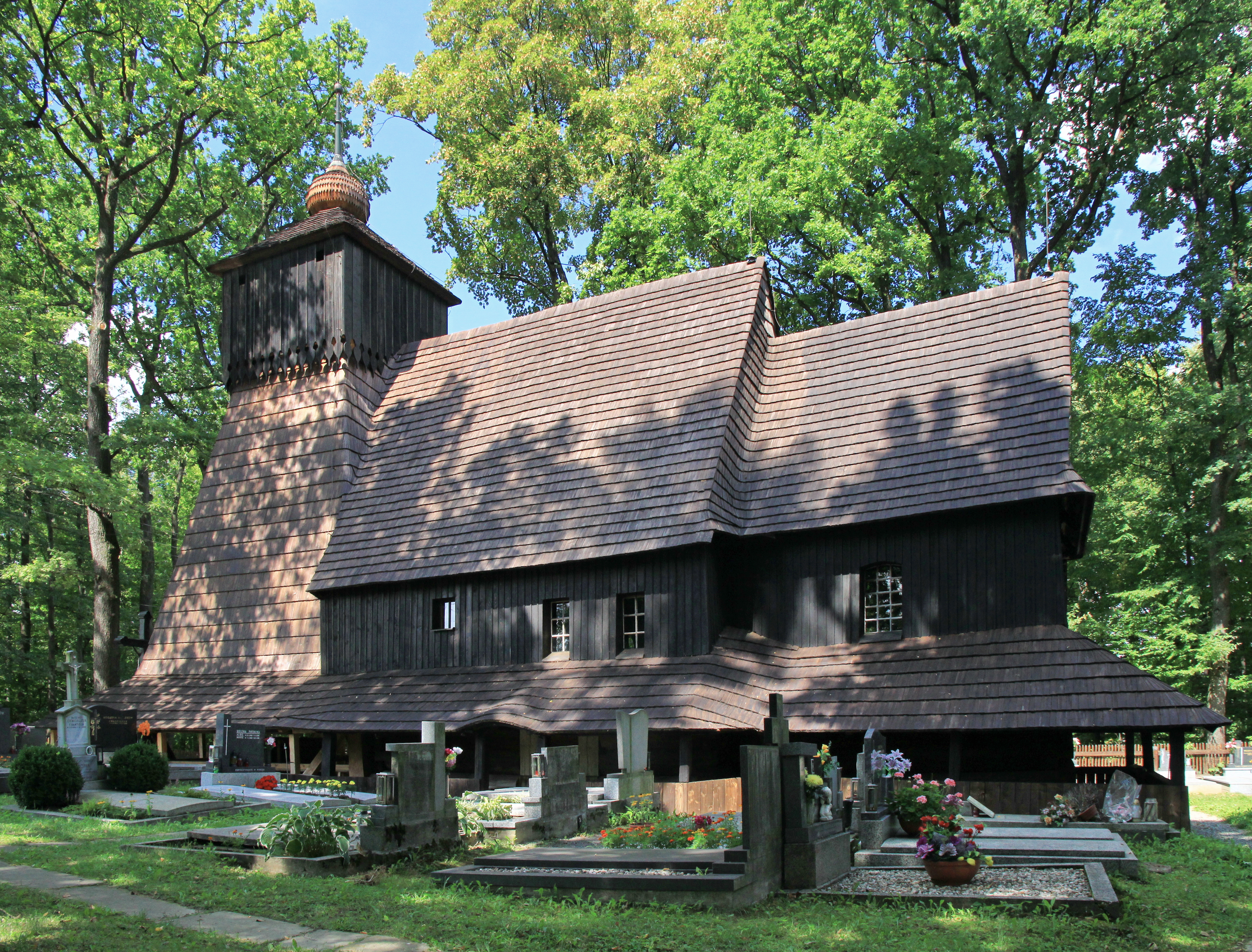
Corpus Christi Church in Guty

Guty (Polish: Guty) is a village in Frýdek-Místek District, Moravian-Silesian Region, Czech Republic. It was a separate municipality but it became a part of the town of Třinec in 1980. It lies in the historical region of Cieszyn Silesia. It has a population of 762 (1 January 2008). A large part of the population of Guty is Polish.

The name is of uncertain origins. It could have been derived from personal name Gut (from German gut?) as in 1307 a person named Domino Johanne dicto Guth was mentioned in one of the Silesian documents.

== History ==
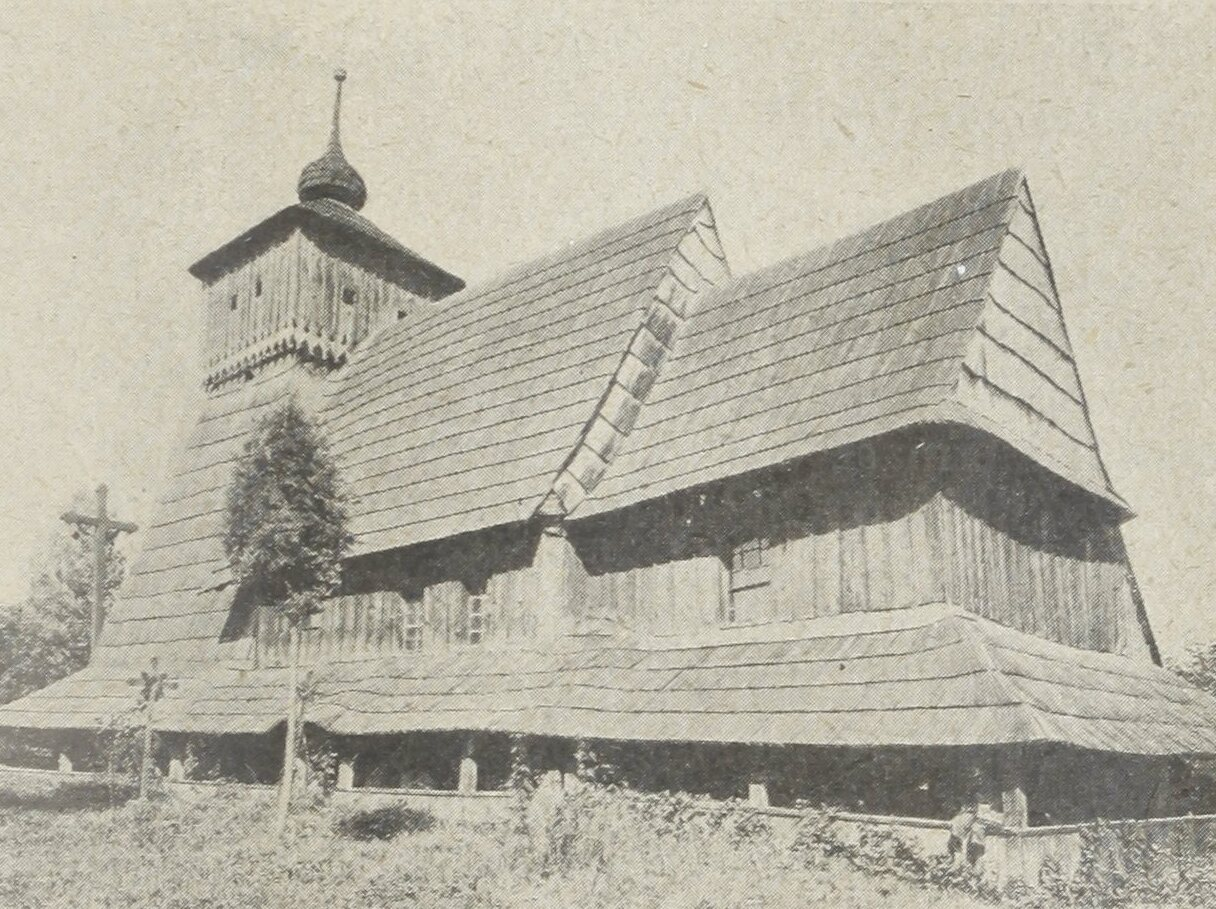
Corpus Christi Church, before 1932

The settlement was first mentioned in a Latin document of Diocese of Wrocław called Liber fundationis episcopatus Vratislaviensis from around 1305 as item in Gutha. It meant that the village was in the process of location (the size of land to pay a tithe from was not yet precised). The creation of the village was a part of a larger settlement campaign taking place in the late 13th century on the territory of what will be later known as Upper Silesia.

Politically the village belonged initially to the Duchy of Teschen, formed in 1290 in the process of feudal fragmentation of Poland and was ruled by a local branch of Piast dynasty. In 1327 the duchy became a fee of Kingdom of Bohemia, which after 1526 became part of the Habsburg monarchy.

After the 1540s Protestant Reformation prevailed in the Duchy of Teschen. In 1563 a local Lutherans built a wooden church. It was taken from them (as one from around fifty buildings) in the region by a special commission and given back to the Roman Catholic Church on 23 March 1654. The Corpus Christi Church burned down completely overnight on 2 August 2017, following an arson attack by three youths from Třinec. The church was rebuilt, and consecrated on 6 June 2021.

After Revolutions of 1848 in the Austrian Empire a modern municipal division was introduced in the re-established Austrian Silesia. The village as a municipality was subscribed to the political and legal district of Cieszyn. According to the censuses conducted in 1880, 1890, 1900 and 1910 the population of the municipality grew from 812 in 1880 to 832 in 1910 with a majority being native Polish-speakers (between 98.3% and 99.9%) accompanied occasionally by a German-speaking people (at most 14 or 1.7% in 1890) and Czech-speaking (at most 7 or 0.9% in 1910). In terms of religion in 1910 majority were Protestants (90.6%), followed by Roman Catholics (7.8%) and 13 people adhering to another faiths (but were no Jews). The village was also traditionally inhabited by Cieszyn Vlachs, speaking Cieszyn Silesian dialect.

After World War I, fall of Austria-Hungary, Polish–Czechoslovak War and the division of Cieszyn Silesia in 1920, it became a part of Czechoslovakia. Following the Munich Agreement, in October 1938 together with the Zaolzie region it was annexed by Poland, administratively adjoined to Cieszyn County of Silesian Voivodeship. It was then annexed by Nazi Germany at the beginning of World War II. After the war it was restored to Czechoslovakia.

The first wooden school in Guty was built in 1775, it was a Protestant school. It served as a school until 1866. In that year a new school was built, with a tower and a bell. It served as a school until 1903. The last Polish school in Guty was built in 1903 and served until 1973. In 1923, the first Czech school was built, it served until 1973. There are currently no schools in the village, so the local children, both Polish and Czech, attend schools in Oldřichovice or Třinec.

== Gallery ==
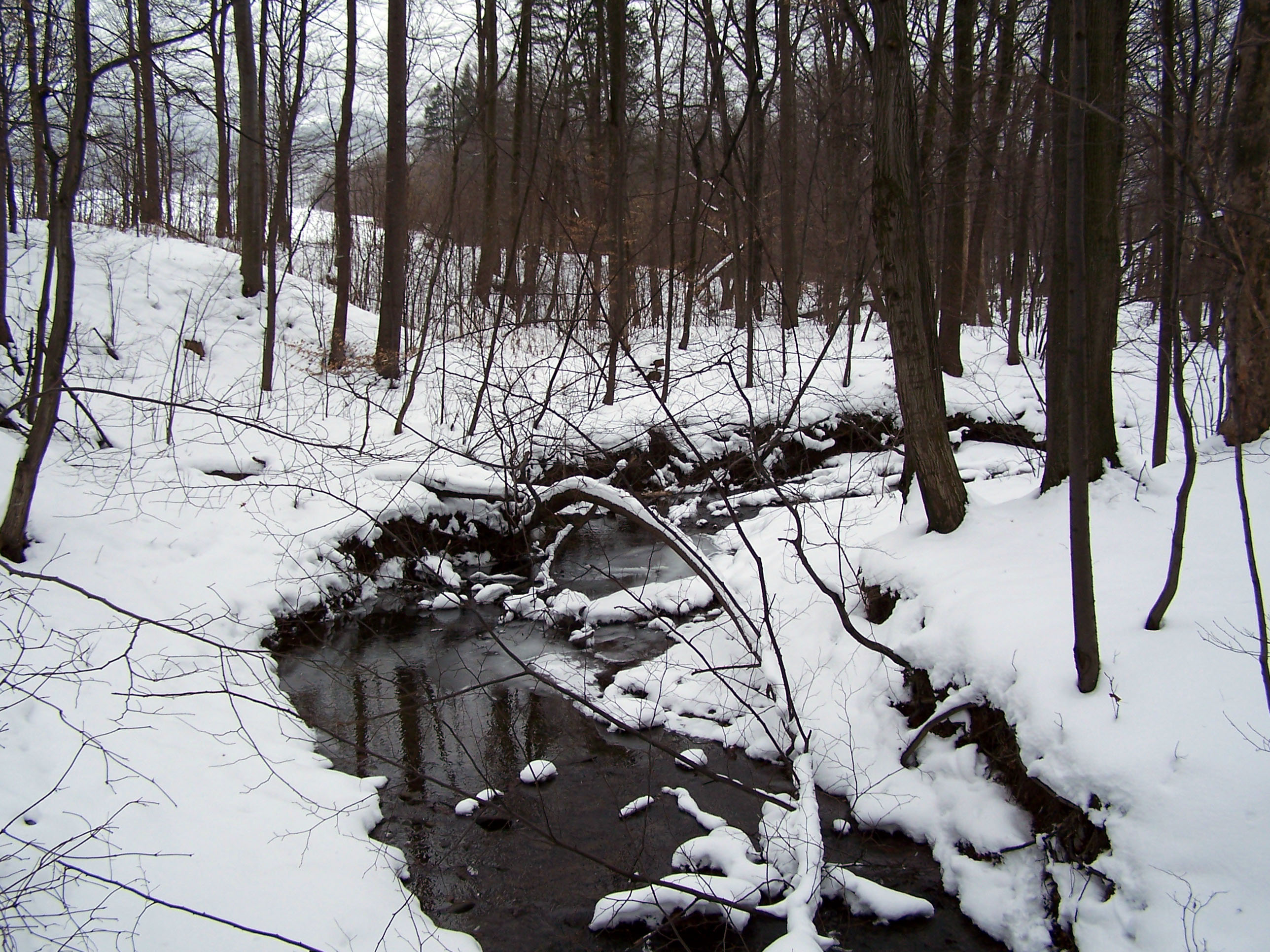
Creek in Guty during winter

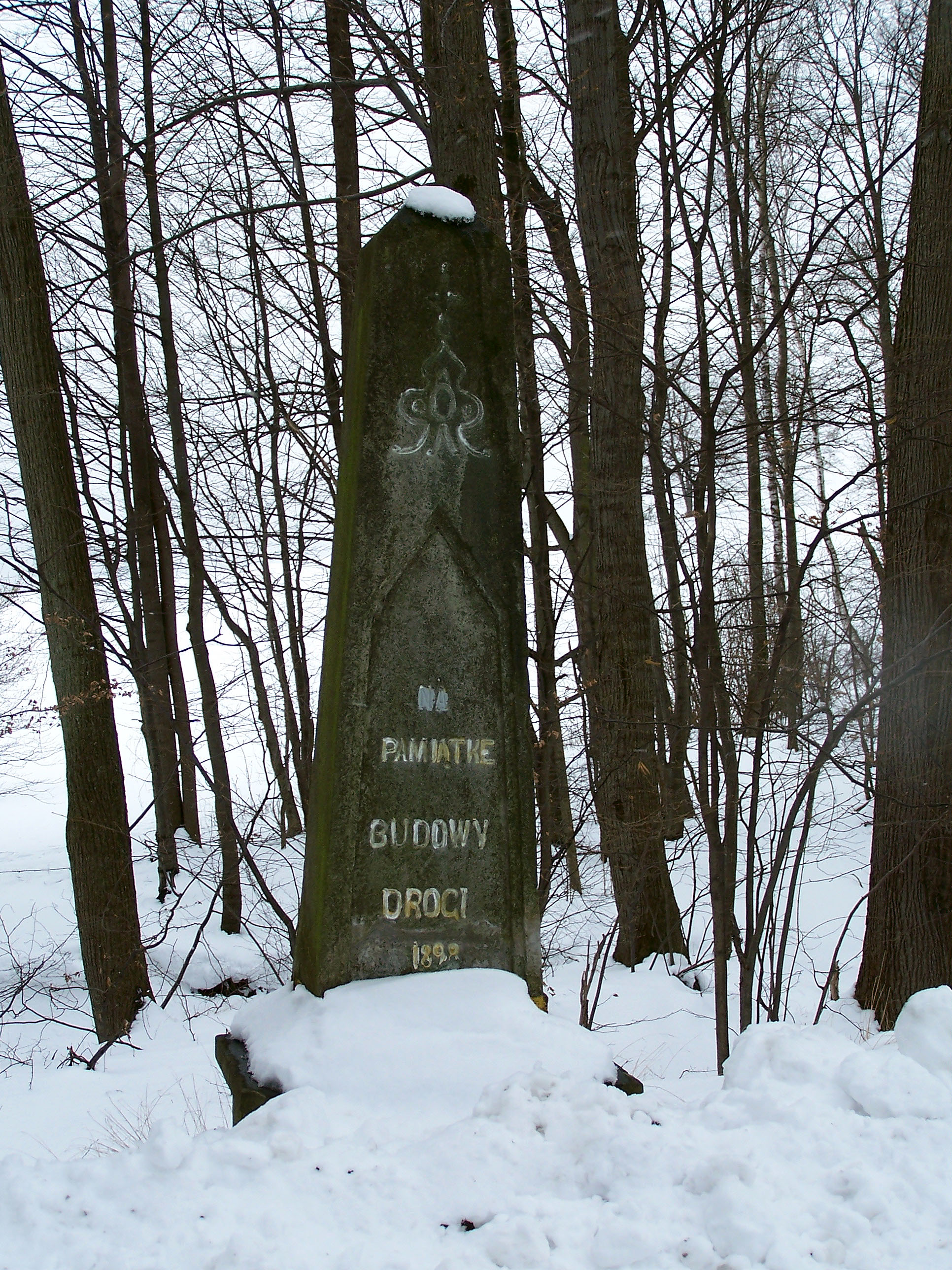
Monument in Guty built in 1898 to commemorate the construction of a road. Inscription is in Polish.

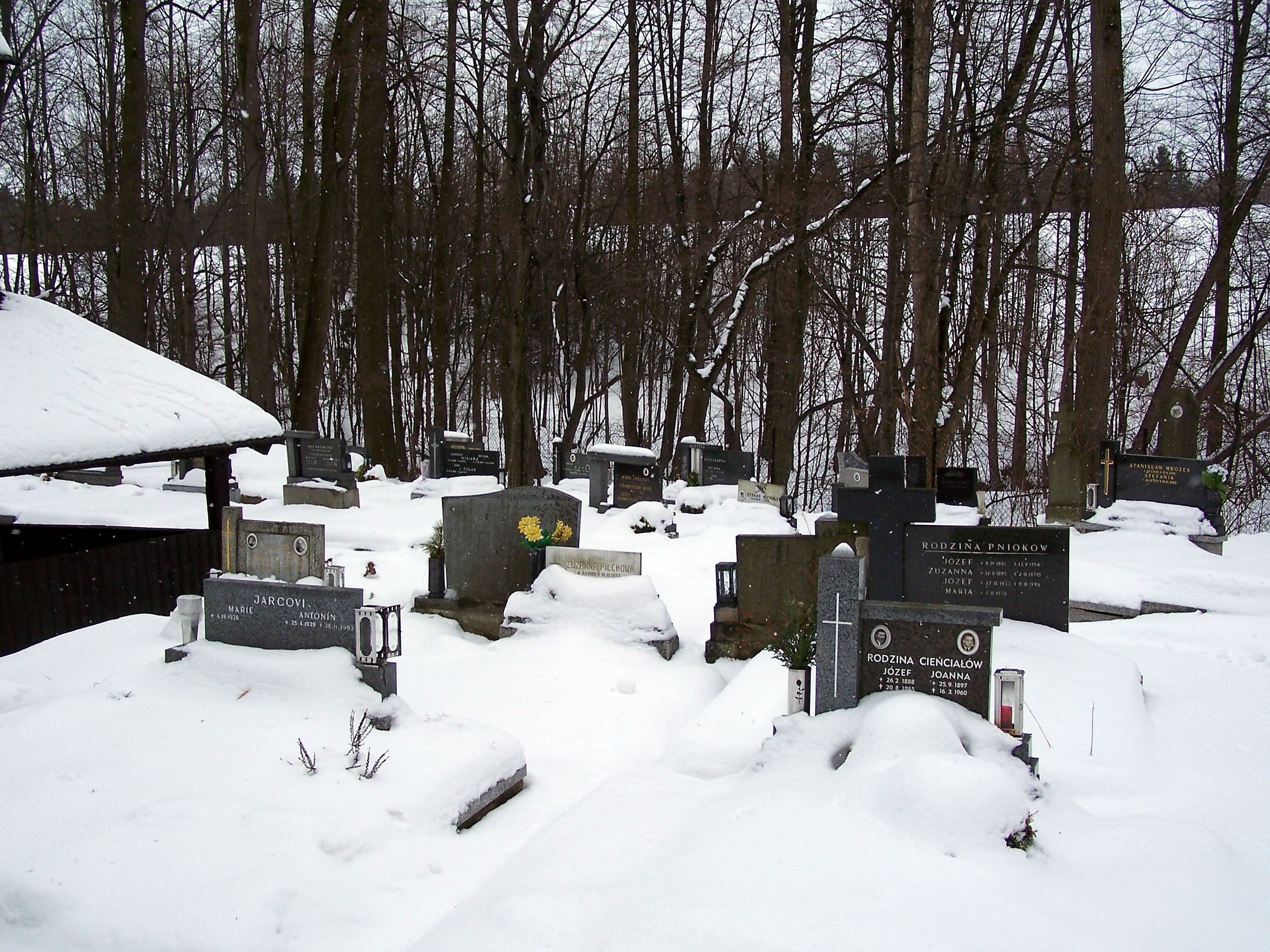
Catholic cemetery near the wooden church

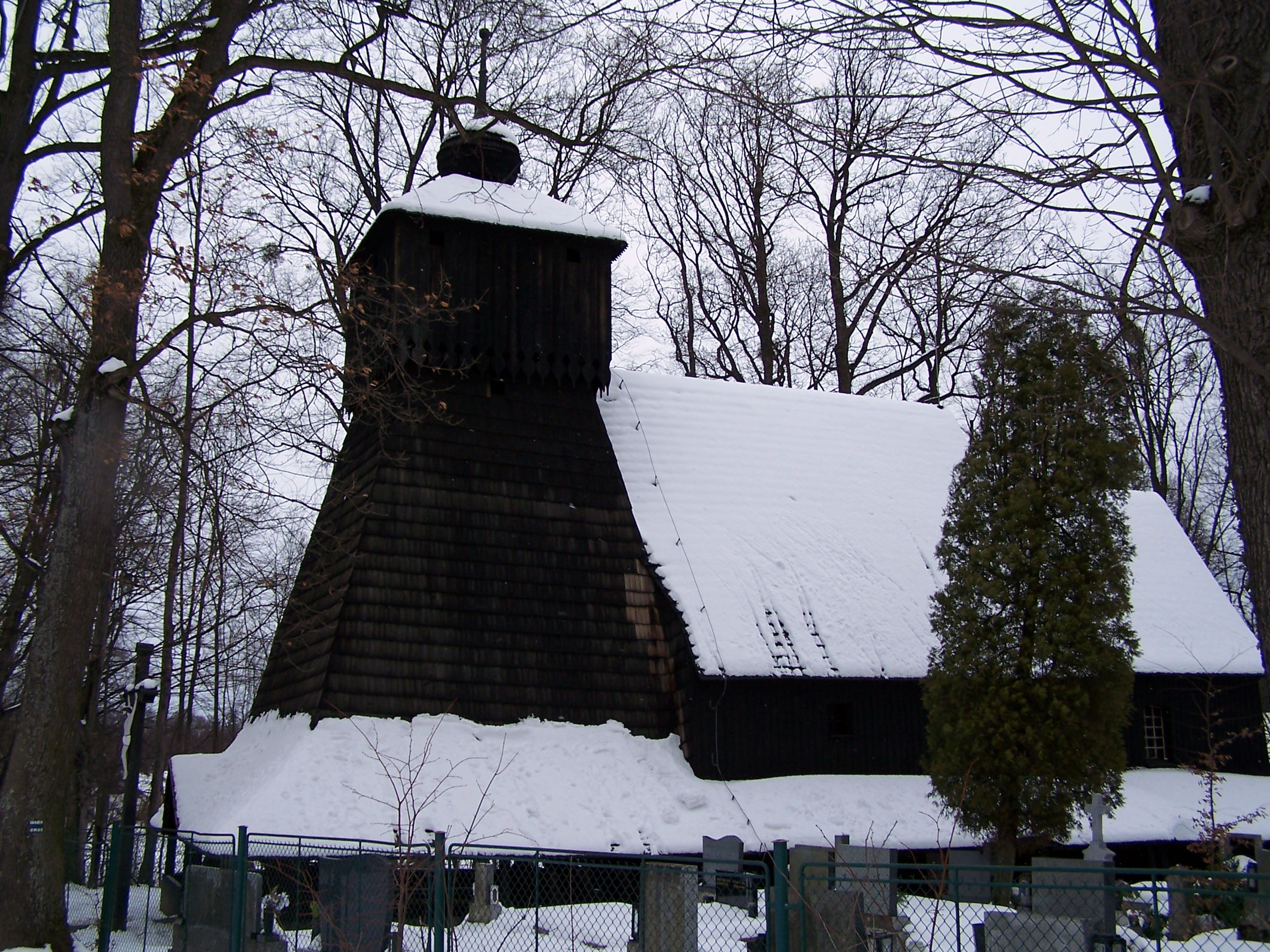
Wooden church

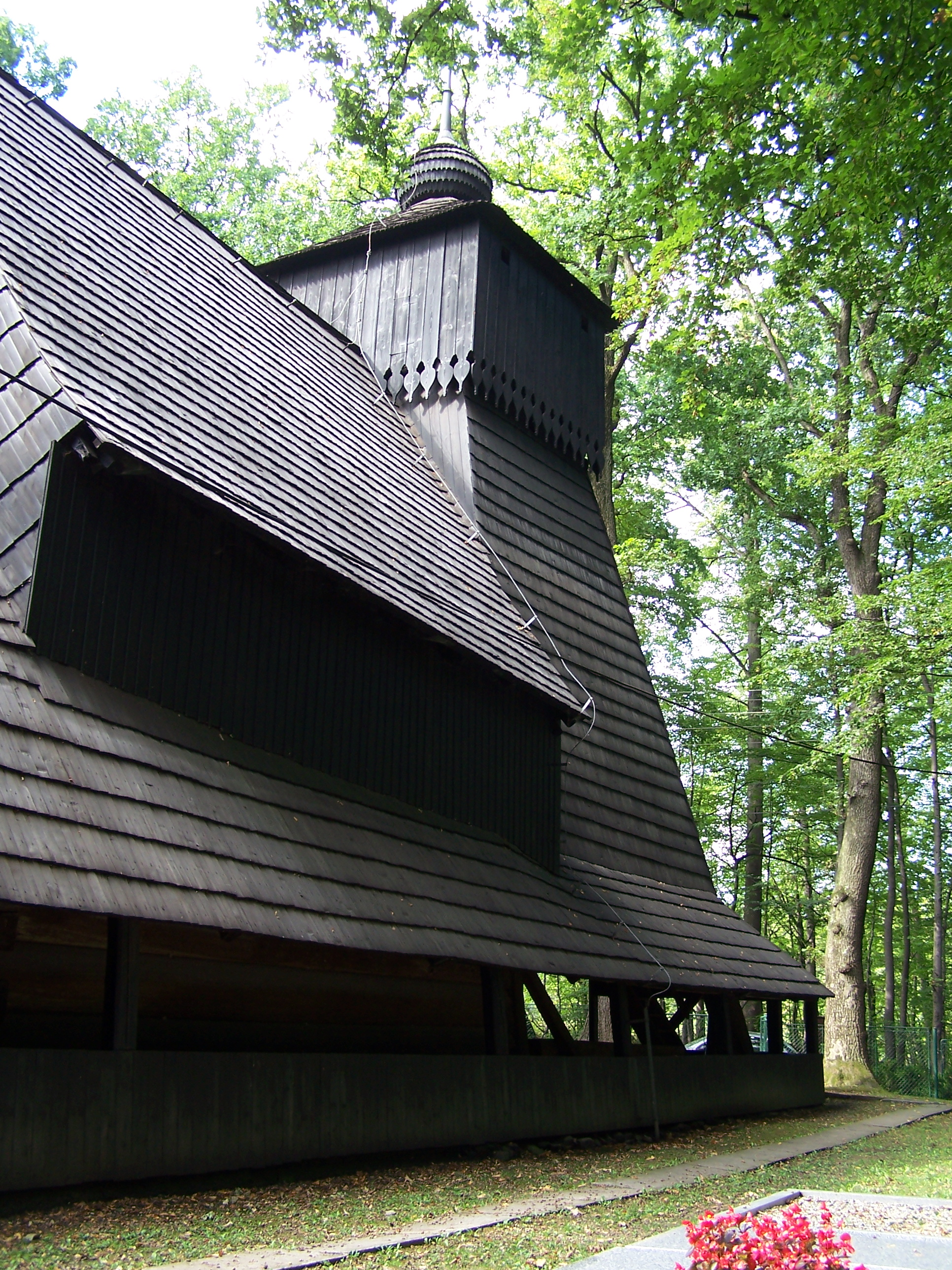
Wooden church

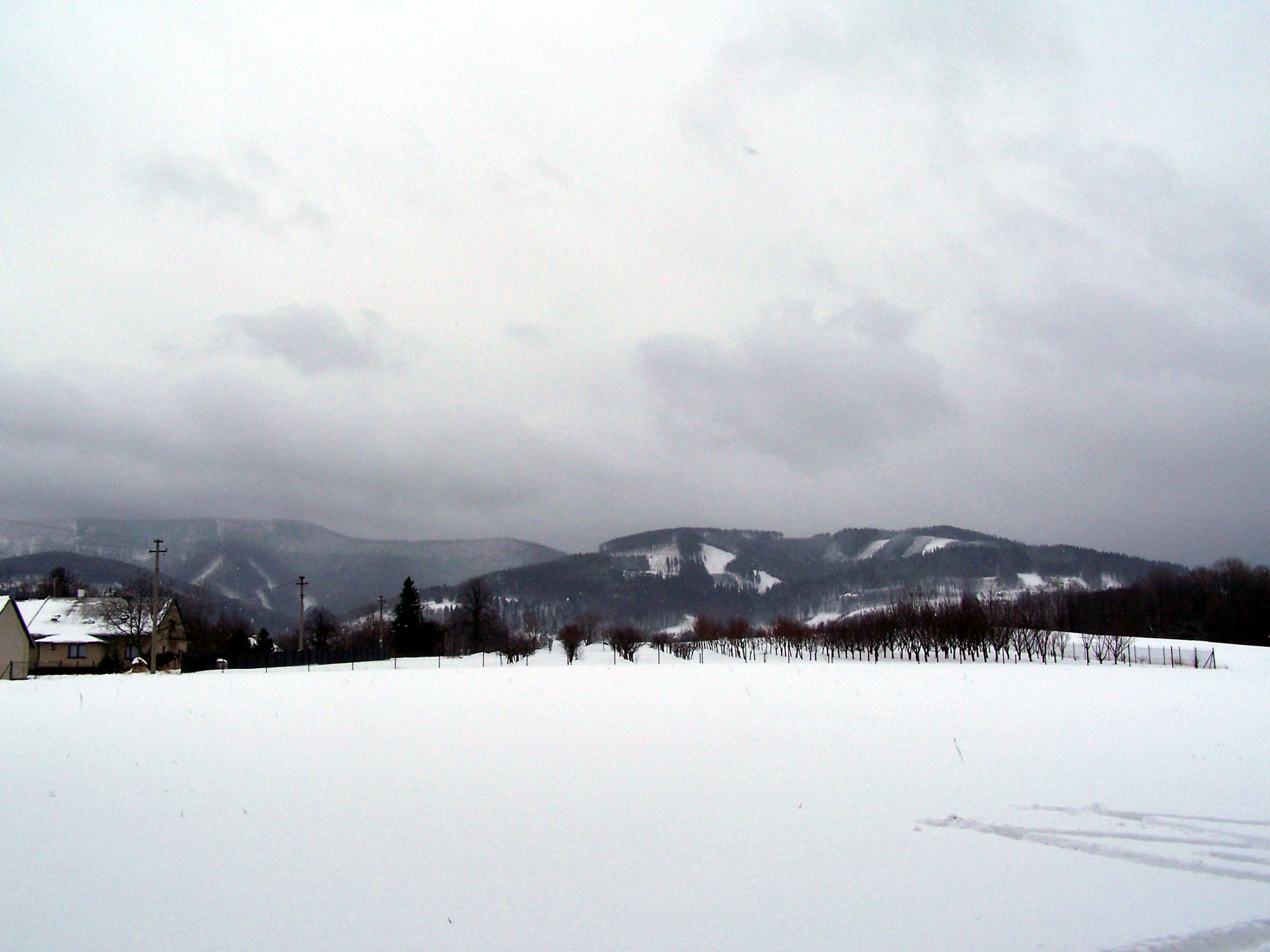
Beskids as seen from Guty

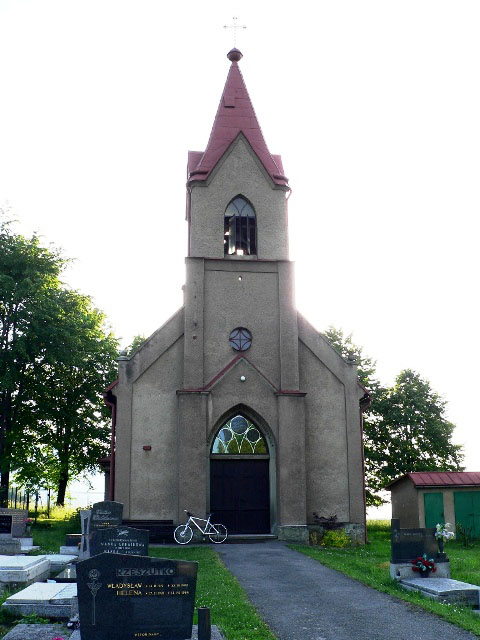
Lutheran church

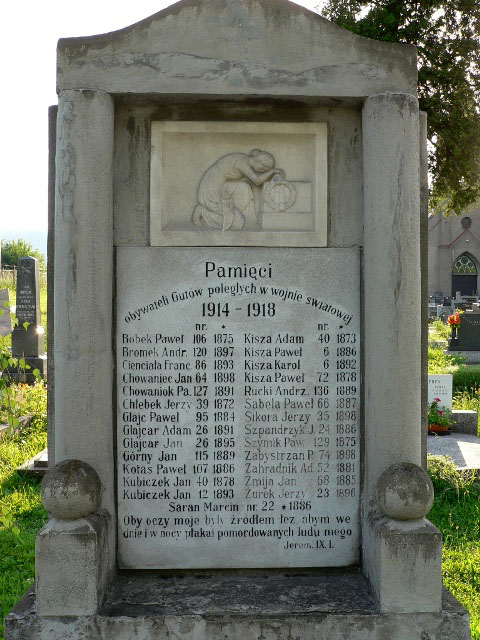
Monument dedicated to local victims of World War I. Inscriptions are in Polish.

== See also ==
- Polish minority in the Czech Republic
- Zaolzie
