= Soňa Pertlová =

Czech chess player (1988–2011)

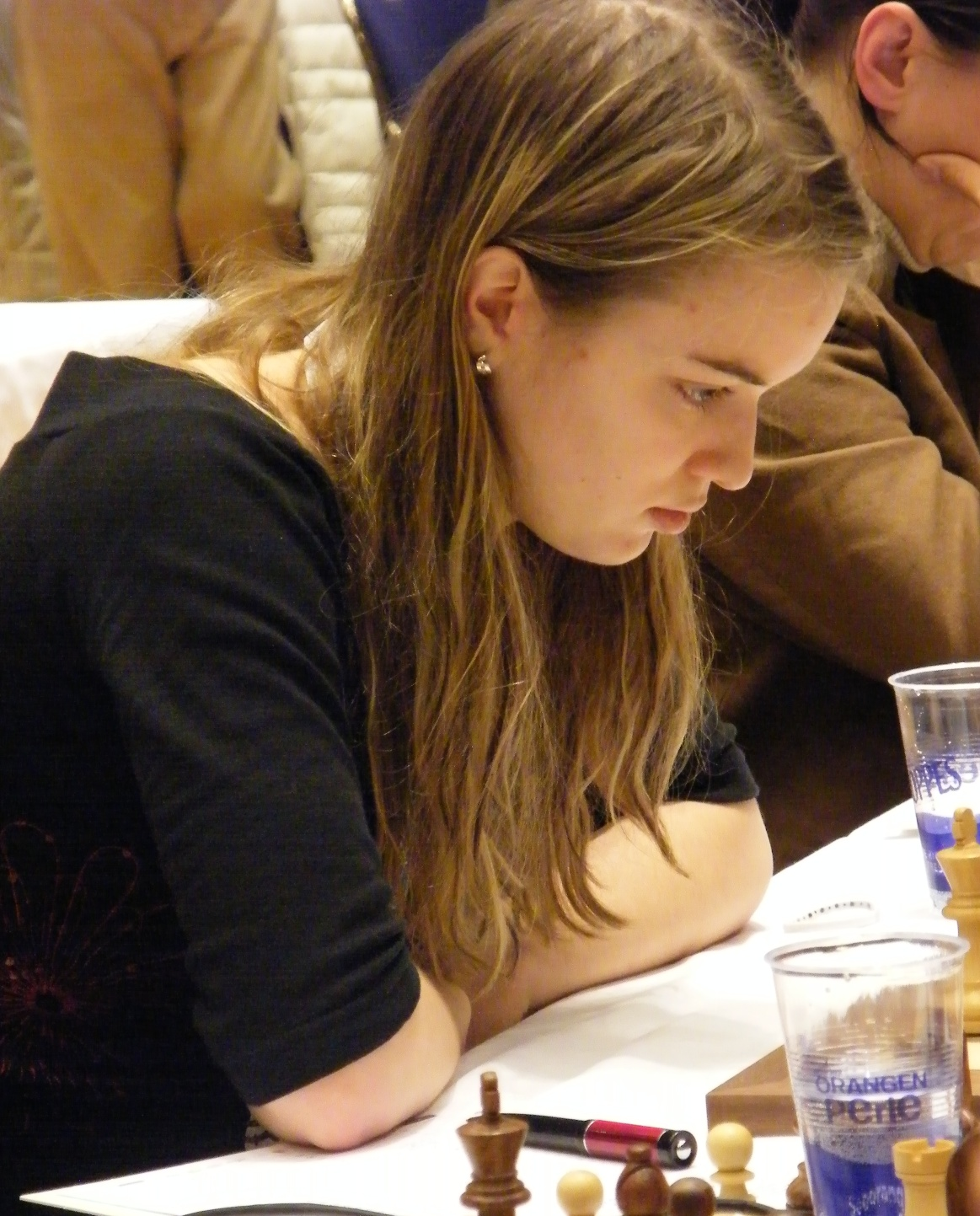

Personal information
- Born: 24 March 1988 Třinec, Czechoslovakia
- Died: 8 May 2011 (aged 23) Třinec, Czech Republic

Chess career
- Country: Czech Republic
- Title: Woman International Master (2008)
- Peak rating: 2262 (January 2010)

Soňa Pertlová (24 March 1988 – 8 May 2011) was a Czech chess player.

== Biography ==
Pertlová was born on 24 March 1988 in Třinec. She was the Czech U12 girl champion in 2000, U16 champion in 2002 and U20 champion in 2007. She finished second in Czech U18 championship in 2006.

She played for the Czech team in the 2008 Chess Olympiad in Dresden, scoring 4 points out of 6 games while being treated for cancer and the European women's team championships in 2005 and 2009. She received the title of Woman FIDE Master (WFM) in 2006 and Woman International Master (WIM) in 2008. She worked several times for the Czech Television, namely on the show V šachu (In chess).
