= Nebory =

Coordinates: 49°40′0″N 18°37′10″E

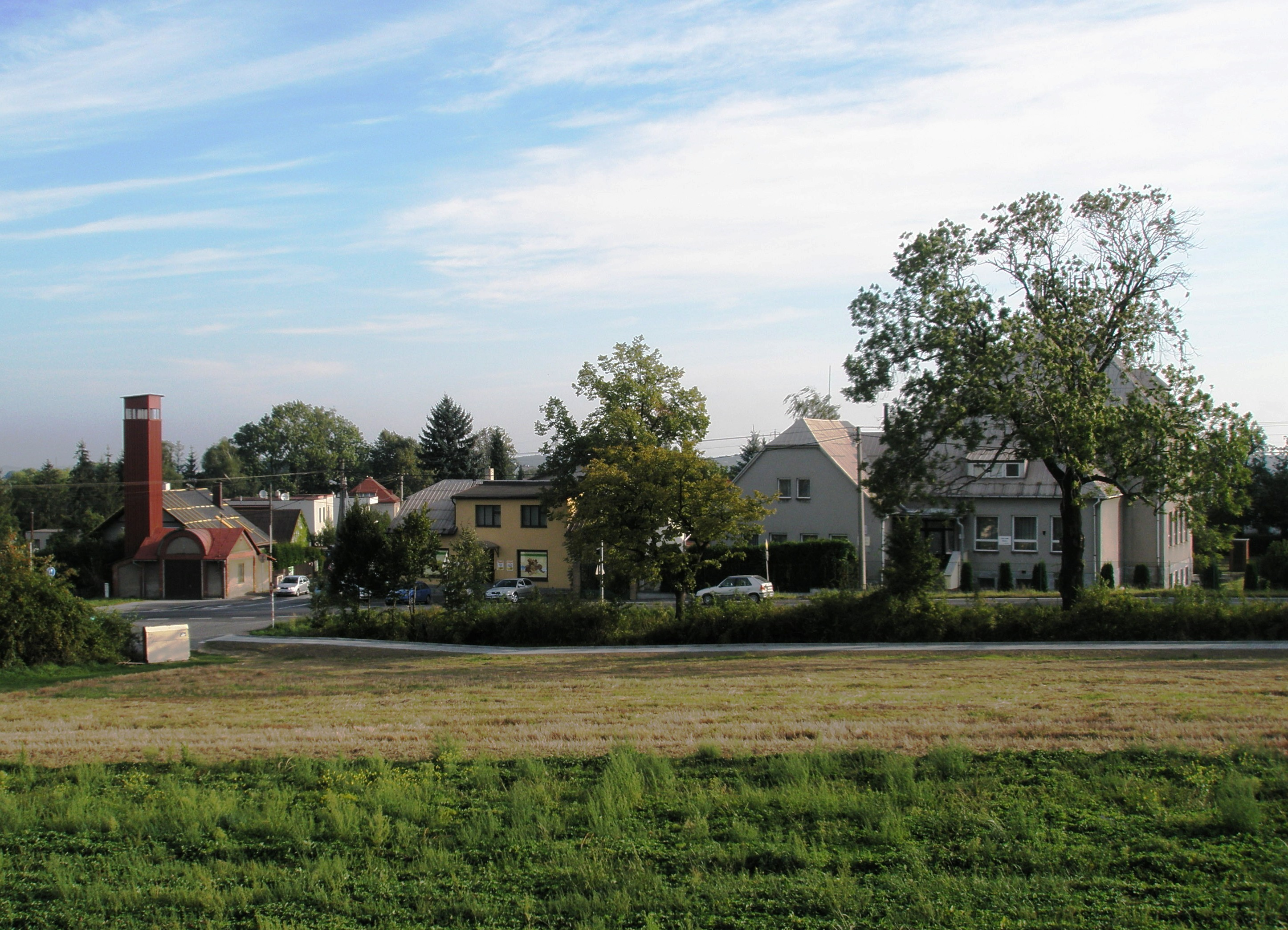
Centre of the village

Nebory (Polish: Niebory) is a village in Frýdek-Místek District, Moravian-Silesian Region, Czech Republic. It was a separate municipality but became administratively a part of Třinec in 1980. It has a population of 1,531 (1 January 2008) and lies in the historical region of Cieszyn Silesia.

The name was originally patronymic in origin derived from personal name Niebor or Niebora and ending typically in Slavic fashion in such names (-(ow)ice, often Germanised as -(ow)itz). Later it was transformed into possessive name (e.g. w Neborowie, 1464).

== History ==
The village was first mentioned in 1425 as Neborowicz[e]. Politically it belonged then to the Duchy of Teschen, a fee of the Kingdom of Bohemia, which after 1526 became part of the Habsburg monarchy.

After Revolutions of 1848 in the Austrian Empire a modern municipal division was introduced in the re-established Austrian Silesia. The village as a municipality was subscribed to the political and legal district of Cieszyn. According to the censuses conducted in 1880, 1890, 1900 and 1910 the population of the municipality grew from 781 in 1880 to 963 in 1910 with a majority being native Polish-speakers (between 96.9% and 99.8%) accompanied by a small German-speaking minority (at most 26 or 3% in 1890) and Czech-speaking people (at most 14 or 1.6% in 1900). In terms of religion in 1910 the majority were Protestants (75.8%), followed by Roman Catholics (24%) and 2 Jews. The village was also traditionally inhabited by Cieszyn Vlachs, speaking Cieszyn Silesian dialect.

After World War I, fall of Austria-Hungary, Polish–Czechoslovak War and the division of Cieszyn Silesia in 1920, it became a part of Czechoslovakia. Following the Munich Agreement, in October 1938 together with the Zaolzie region it was annexed by Poland, administratively adjoined to Cieszyn County of Silesian Voivodeship. It was then annexed by Nazi Germany at the beginning of World War II. After the war it was restored to Czechoslovakia.

== See also ==
- Polish minority in the Czech Republic
- Zaolzie
