= Lyžbice =

Neighborhood of Třinec

- Municipal part of Třinec
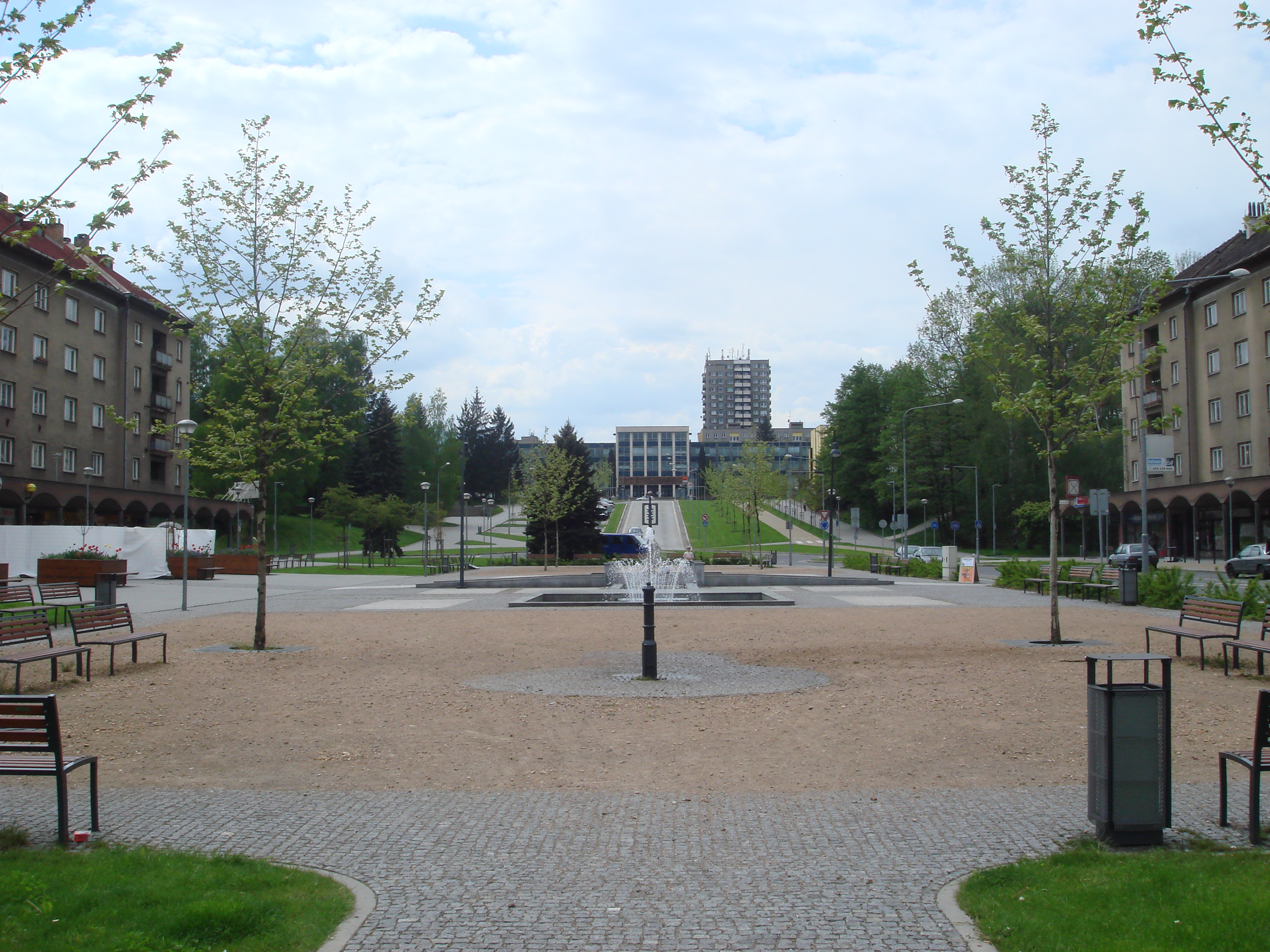
- T. G. Masaryka Square
- Interactive map of Lyžbice
- Coordinates: 49°40′01″N 18°40′55″E
- Country: Czech Republic
- Region: Moravian-Silesian
- District: Frýdek-Místek
- Municipality: Třinec

Area
  - Total: 4.76 km^{2} (1.84 sq mi)

Population (2021)
  - Total: 14,467
  - Density: 3,040/km^{2} (7,870/sq mi)
- Time zone: UTC+1 (CET)
  - Summer (DST): UTC+2 (CEST)
- Postal code: 739 61

Lyžbice (Polish: Łyżbice, German: Lischbitz) is a part of the city of Třinec in Frýdek-Místek District, Moravian-Silesian Region, Czech Republic, on the Olza River. It was a separate municipality but later became a part of Třinec. It lies in the historical region of Cieszyn Silesia and has about 14,000 inhabitants.

== Etymology ==
The name is of patronymic origins derived from personal name *Łyżba.

== History ==
The village was first mentioned in 1562 as Lyzbycz. It belonged then to the Duchy of Teschen, a fee of the Kingdom of Bohemia and a part of the Habsburg monarchy.

The village with Nýdek was bought from Joseph Freyherrn von Beess by Teschener Kammer in 1792 for 46,000 florins.

After the Revolutions of 1848 in the Austrian Empire a modern municipal division was introduced in the re-established Austrian Silesia. The village as a municipality was subscribed to the political district of Cieszyn and the legal district of Jablunkov (at least from 1880).

After World War I, fall of Austria-Hungary, Polish–Czechoslovak War and the division of Cieszyn Silesia in 1920, it became a part of Czechoslovakia. Following the Munich Agreement, in October 1938 together with the Zaolzie region it was annexed by Poland, administratively adjoined to Cieszyn County of Silesian Voivodeship. It was then annexed by Nazi Germany at the beginning of World War II. After the war it was restored to Czechoslovakia.

Until the rapid expansion of Třinec in the 20th century, it was a larger and more populous village than Třinec.

In 1946 Lyžbice were merged with the town of Třinec and became a place where in the 1950s the ruling Communist Party of Czechoslovakia began a large scale development in the style of socialist realism. Afterwards Lyžbice became a new downtown, overtaking the role from Staré Město (lit. Old Town).

== Demographics ==
According to the censuses conducted in 1880, 1890, 1900 and 1910 the population of the municipality grew from 1,013 in 1880 to 1,251 in 1910 with a majority being native Polish-speakers (between 96.7% and 99.7%) accompanied by Czech-speaking (at most 23 or 2.3% in 1880) and German-speaking people (at most 10 or 1% in 1880). In terms of religion in 1910 the majority were Protestants (78.4%), followed by Roman Catholics (21.6%). The village was also traditionally inhabited by Cieszyn Vlachs, speaking Cieszyn Silesian dialect.

Historical population

Year	Pop.	±%
1869	714	—
1880	1,013	+41.9%
1890	1,113	+9.9%
1900	1,374	+23.5%
1910	1,251	−9.0%

Year	Pop.	±%
1921	1,305	+4.3%
1930	1,549	+18.7%
1950	1,571	+1.4%
1961	5,952	+278.9%
1970	18,247	+206.6%

Year	Pop.	±%
1980	21,971	+20.4%
1991	19,949	−9.2%
2001	18,173	−8.9%
2011	16,190	−10.9%
2021	14,467	−10.6%

Source: Censuses

== See also ==
- Polish minority in the Czech Republic
- Zaolzie
