= Czeslaw Walek =

Czech lawyer and LGBT activist

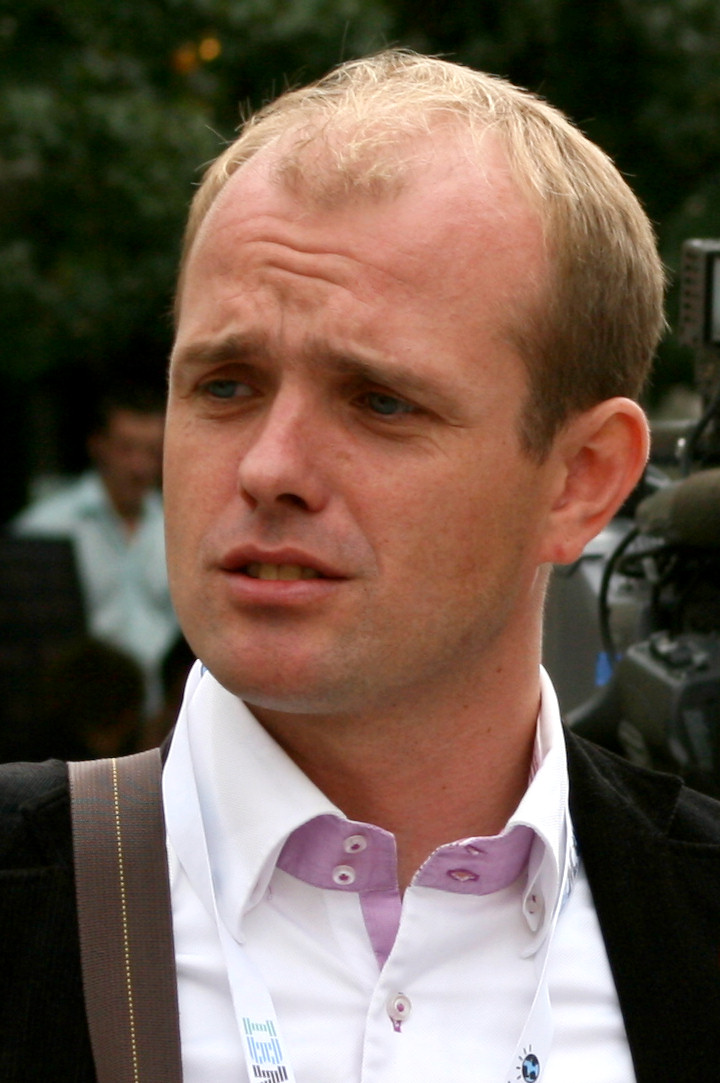
Czeslaw Walek in 2011

Czeslaw Walek (born 31 January 1975) is a Czech lawyer and LGBT activist of Polish origin. He served as Deputy Minister of Human Rights and Minorities from 2009 to 2011, and is the founder and chairman of the Prague Pride association that organises the annual festival of the same name.

== Early life and education ==
Walek grew up in Třinec. He is of Polish origin; both of his parents have Polish nationality and Czech citizenship.

Walek studied law in Kraków at Jagiellonian University from 1993 to 1999, supported by a stipend from the Polish government. He spent a year as an Erasmus student in Antwerp, Belgium, and graduated with honors in 2000 from Central European University (CEU) in Budapest, Hungary, where he focused on human rights.

== Professional career and activism ==
He worked for the Czech branch of Transparency International where he managed the program on police corruption.

From 2003 to 2011 (with a two-year break) he worked at the Government Office as Director of the Office of the Governmental Council for Roma Community. In 2004, he created the Action Plan for the Decade of Roma Inclusion, and helped create the Agency for Social Inclusion. Between 2007 and 2009 he was the program director for the Czech Republic, Hungary and Slovakia at the US-based charity Trust for Civil Society in Central Eastern Europe. In March 2009 he was appointed the Deputy Minister for Human Rights and Minorities, and after the resignation of Minister Michael Kocáb he took over management of the Office until February 2011.

In 2011 he received the Alice Garrigue Masaryk Human Rights Award from the US Embassy for his contributions in the field of human rights.

Since January 2011 he has served as the chairman of the Prague Pride association, which organises Prague's Pride parade, supports LGBT people in crisis, and campaigns for LGBT workplace equality and the legalisation of same-sex marriage in the Czech Republic.

Since March 2012 he has been Executive Director of the Open Society Foundation in Prague. In 2015–2016 he received a Fulbright Scholarship for research on LGBT advancement in the Czech Republic, and within the framework of the Fulbright Scholarship he was a Global Fellow at the US-based non-profit Out & Equal Workplace Advocates.

He has been a board member of CEU's Human Rights Students' Initiative, the Czech chapter of Transparency International, the Open Society Foundation in Prague, Open House Prague and Alturi. In 2014 he was appointed a member of the Council for Human Rights and the Czech-Polish Forum, both government bodies.

In 2013 he ran unsuccessfully for Parliament for the Green Party.

== Personal life ==
Walek speaks English, Spanish, Czech and Polish. On 2 May 2014 he married his Dutch partner Willem van der Bas in Delft, Netherlands.
