= Vojtěch Kučera =

Czech poet and literary editor (born 1975)

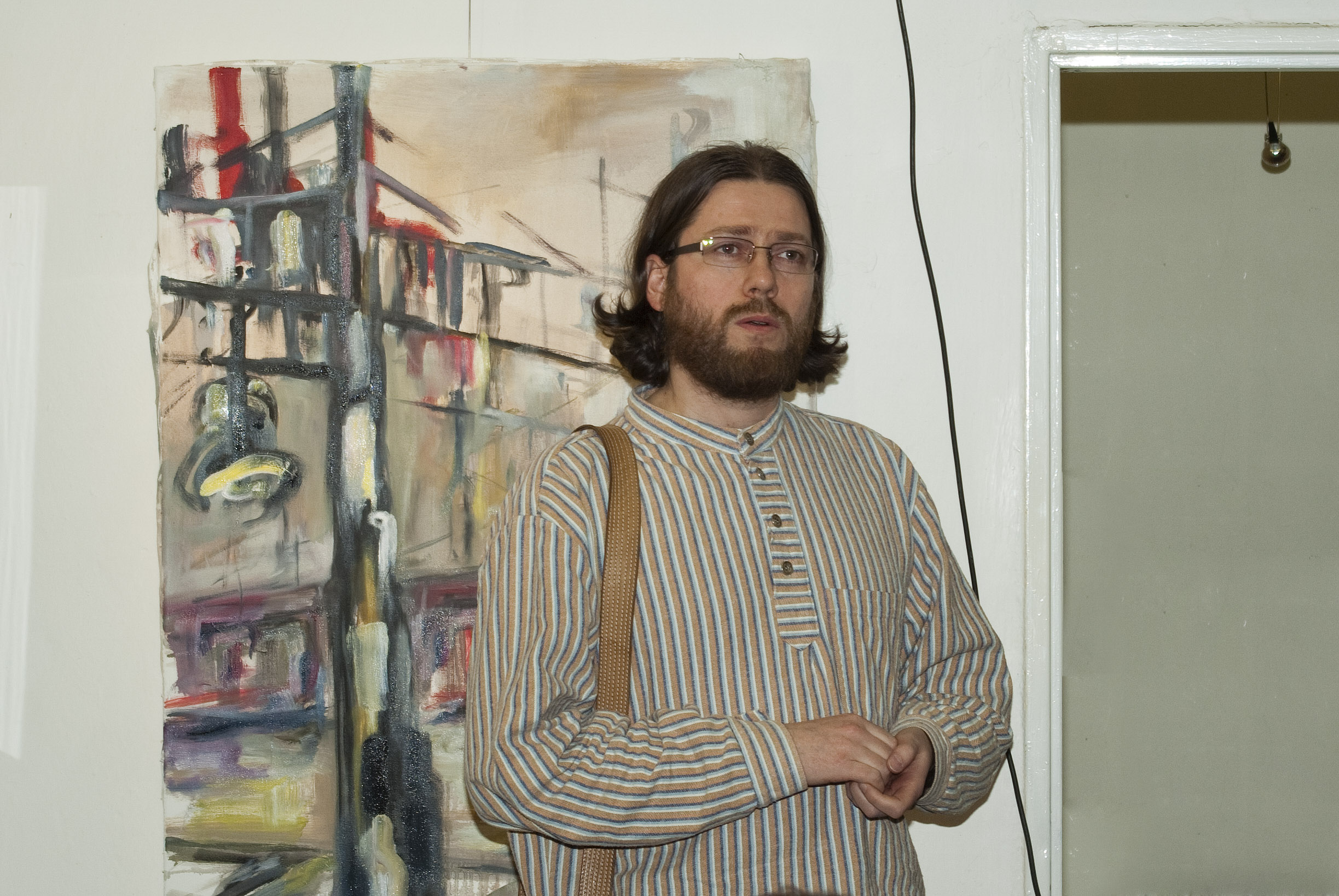
Vojtěch Kučera (2011)

Vojtěch Kučera (born 19 January 1975 in Třinec, in the Czech Republic) is a Czech poet and literary editor. He studied geography at the Faculty of Science of the Masaryk University in Brno. He is a longtime editor-in-chief of the poetry magazine Weles.

== Works ==
=== Poetry ===
- Nehybnost on-line 2008 & 2009; MaPa, Brno 2010
- A hudba? Host, Brno 2005
- Samomluvy Vetus Via, Brno 2000
