= Třinec =

City in the Czech Republic

Třinec Trzyniec
- Statutory city
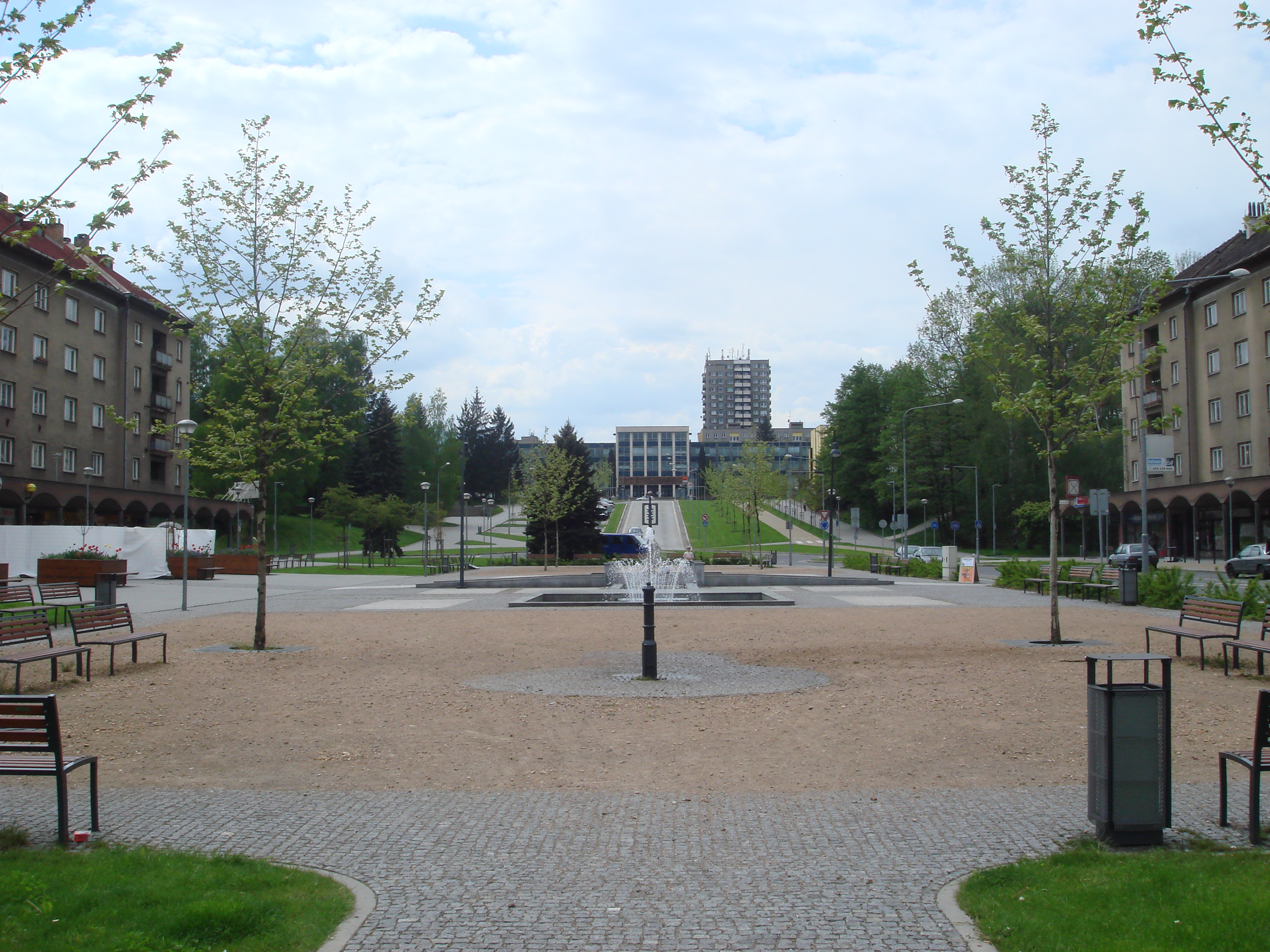
- The square Náměstí T. G. Masaryka

- Flag Coat of arms

- Location in the Czech Republic
- Coordinates: 49°40′40″N 18°40′22″E
- Country: Czech Republic
- Region: Moravian-Silesian
- District: Frýdek-Místek
- First mentioned: 1444

Government
  - Mayor: Marian Plucnar (VOLTE Třinec)

Area
  - Total: 85.37 km^{2} (32.96 sq mi)
- Elevation: 306 m (1,004 ft)

Population (2026-01-01)
  - Total: 33,523
  - Density: 392.7/km^{2} (1,017/sq mi)
- Time zone: UTC+1 (CET)
  - Summer (DST): UTC+2 (CEST)
- Postal codes: 739 55, 739 61, 739 94
- Website: www.trinecko.cz

Třinec (Czech pronunciation: [ˈtr̝̊ɪnɛts]; Polish: Trzyniec, German: Trzynietz) is a city in Frýdek-Místek District in the Moravian-Silesian Region of the Czech Republic. It has about 34,000 inhabitants, making it the least populated statutory city in the country. Třinec is located on the Olza River on the border with Poland and is an important cultural centre of the Polish minority in the Czech Republic.

Třinec was probably founded in the second half of the 14th century, but it only became a town in 1931 as a result of industrialisation and subsequent growth. The city is known for the Třinec Iron and Steel Works company – the only steel producer in the country, which has a major impact on the city's character and demographics.

== Administrative division ==
Třinec consists of 13 municipal parts (in brackets population according to the 2021 census):

- Dolní Líštná (3,597)
- Guty (836)
- Horní Líštná (400)
- Kanada (1,044)
- Karpentná (787)
- Kojkovice (342)
- Konská (1,635)
- Lyžbice (14,467)
- Nebory (1,848)
- Oldřichovice (3,118)
- Osůvky (446)
- Staré Město (4,797)
- Tyra (465)

== Etymology ==
The name Třinec is of topographic origin, derived from the Slavic word for reed (Polish: trzcina, Czech: třtina).

== Geography ==
Třinec is located about 22 kilometres (14 mi) east of Frýdek-Místek and 30 km (19 mi) southeast of Ostrava. It lies in the historical region of Cieszyn Silesia, on the border with Poland and also near the border with Slovakia, which is about 20 km (12 mi) of the city centre.

Třinec lies on the Olza River. The Tyra Stream flows across the municipal territory and joins the Olza in the city centre. The elevation of the built-up area is approximately 300 m (980 ft) above sea level. The northern part of the municipal territory is located in the Moravian-Silesian Foothills. The southern, sparsely populated part is located in the Moravian-Silesian Beskids mountain range, which also lies within the Beskydy Protected Landscape Area. The municipal border runs along the peaks of several mountains, including Ostrý (with an elevation of 1,044 metres (3,425 ft) the highest point in Třinec), Smrčina at 1,015 m (3,330 ft), Šindelná at 1,000 m (3,300 ft), and Javorový at 1,032 m (3,386 ft).

=== Climate ===
Třinec has a humid continental climate (Cfb in the Köppen climate classification).

Climate data for Třinec
Month	Jan	Feb	Mar	Apr	May	Jun	Jul	Aug	Sep	Oct	Nov	Dec	Year
Mean daily maximum °C (°F)	−0.1 (31.8)	1.6 (34.9)	6.5 (43.7)	12.9 (55.2)	17.2 (63.0)	20.3 (68.5)	22.1 (71.8)	22.2 (72.0)	17.4 (63.3)	12.4 (54.3)	7.2 (45.0)	1.7 (35.1)	11.8 (53.2)
Daily mean °C (°F)	−2.8 (27.0)	−1.6 (29.1)	2.4 (36.3)	8.2 (46.8)	12.9 (55.2)	16.4 (61.5)	18.2 (64.8)	17.9 (64.2)	13.4 (56.1)	8.8 (47.8)	4.4 (39.9)	−0.7 (30.7)	8.1 (46.6)
Mean daily minimum °C (°F)	−5.9 (21.4)	−5.1 (22.8)	−1.8 (28.8)	2.9 (37.2)	7.9 (46.2)	11.6 (52.9)	13.6 (56.5)	13.2 (55.8)	9.3 (48.7)	5.4 (41.7)	1.6 (34.9)	−3.2 (26.2)	4.1 (39.4)
Average precipitation mm (inches)	70 (2.8)	65 (2.6)	75 (3.0)	76 (3.0)	115 (4.5)	119 (4.7)	139 (5.5)	102 (4.0)	101 (4.0)	72 (2.8)	71 (2.8)	69 (2.7)	1,074 (42.4)
Source: https://en.climate-data.org/europe/czech-republic/trinec/trinec-44574/

== History ==
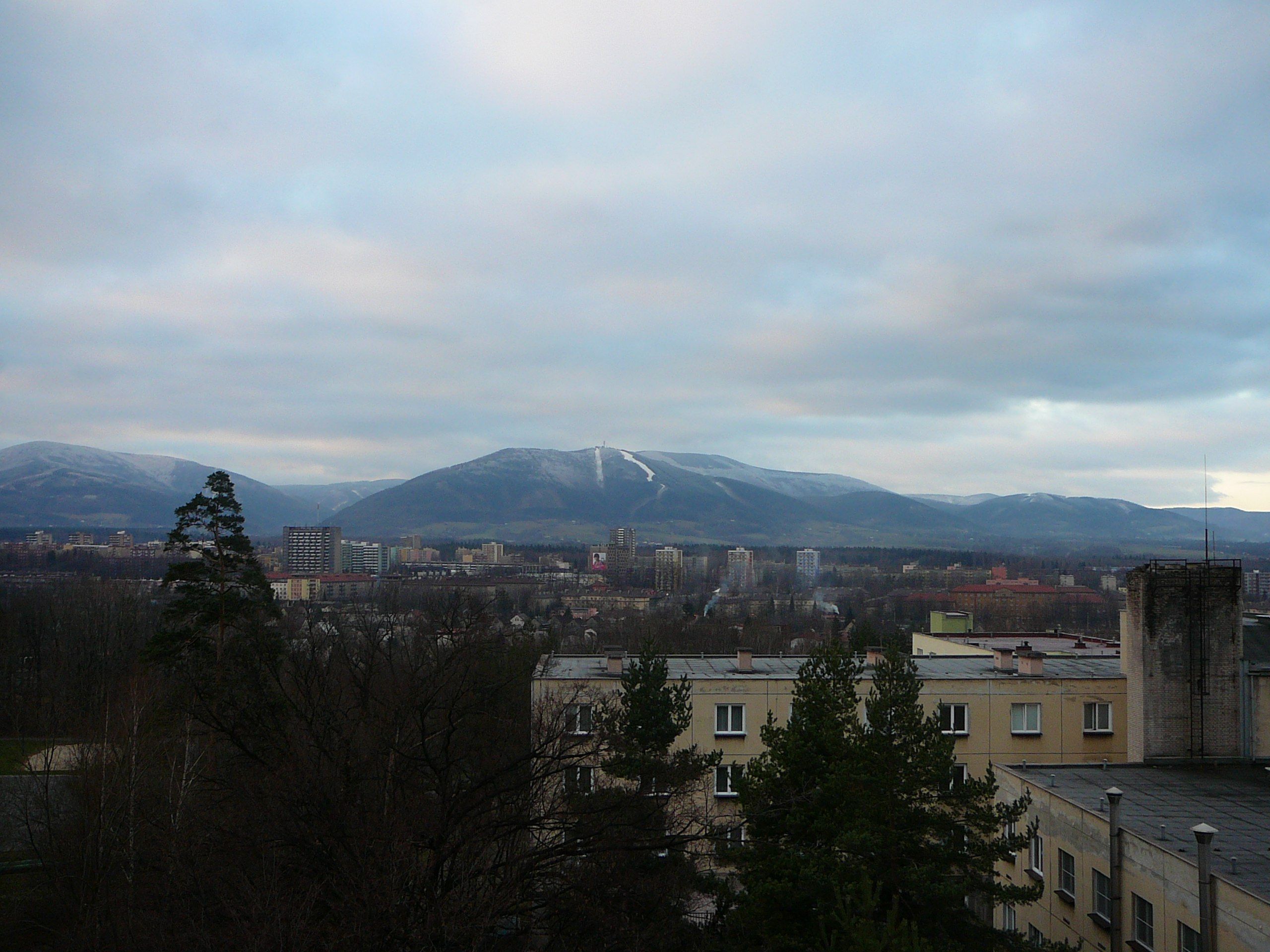
View of the city with the Moravian-Silesian Beskids in the background

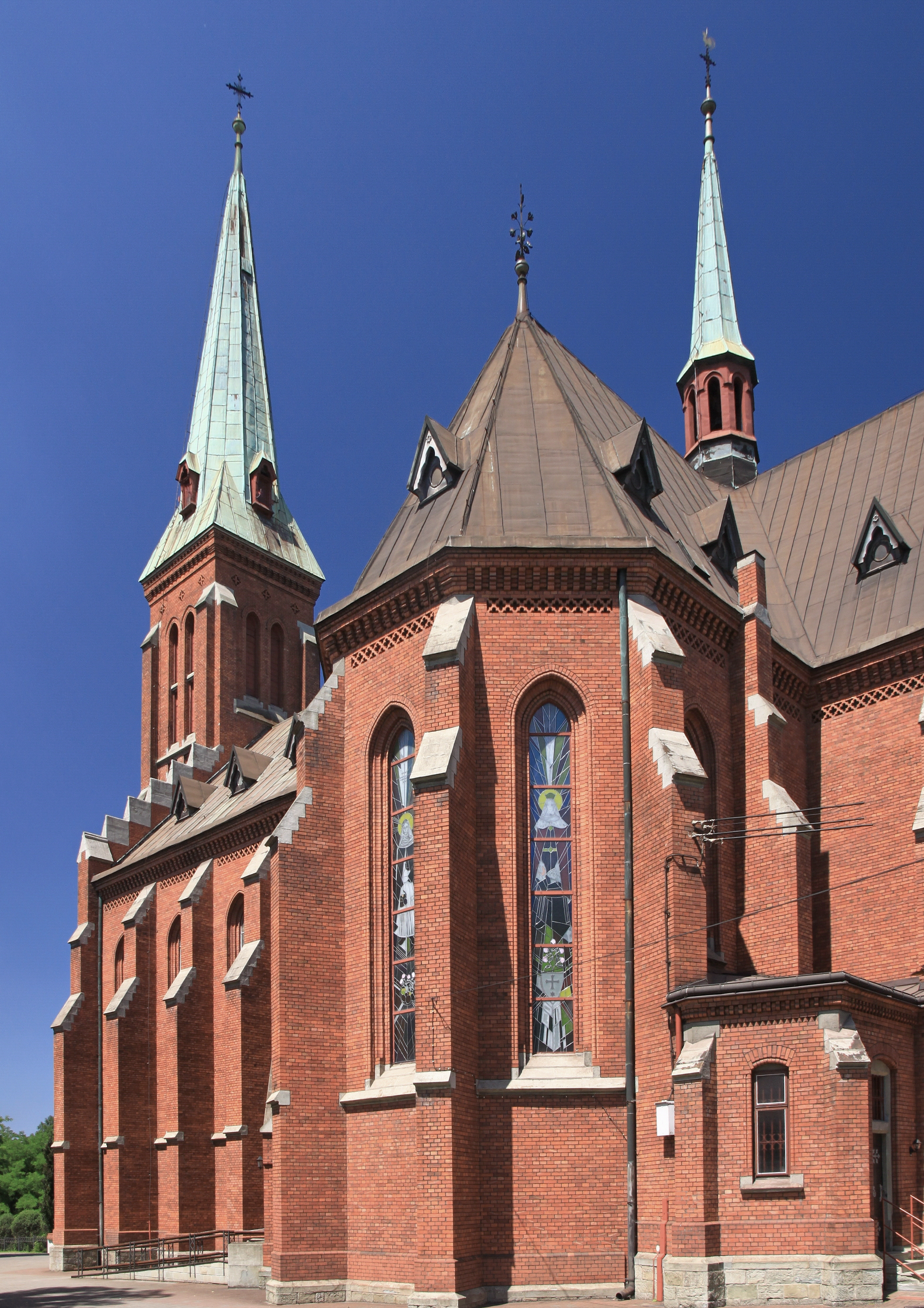
Church of Saint Albert

The first written mention of Třinec is from 1444, but the village was probably founded already in the second half of the 14th century. Politically, the village then belonged to the Duchy of Teschen, a fee of the Kingdom of Bohemia, which after 1526 became part of the Habsburg monarchy. In 1770, the village had about 200 inhabitants and was completely agricultural.

The area was rich in iron ore deposits and had sufficient water energy and a high supply of wood, which were the main reasons to establish an iron works there. The iron mill began operation in 1839, becoming the largest in the entire Cieszyn Silesia, and became a major milestone in the history of the village, which reoriented itself to industry. After the construction of the Košice–Bohumín Railway line in 1871, rapid development of the town took place.

After the revolutions of 1848 in the Austrian Empire, a modern municipal division was introduced in the re-established Austrian Silesia. The village as a municipality was added to the political and legal district of Cieszyn. According to censuses conducted in 1880–1910, the population of the municipality grew from 1,792 in 1880 to 3,849 in 1910, with a majority being native Polish speakers (growing from 51.4% in 1880 to 96.6% in 1900 and 96% in 1910), accompanied by a German-speaking minority (at most 32.5% in 1880, then dropping to 12.2% in 1900, and up to 24.3% in 1910) and Czech speakers (peaking in 1890 at 17.4%, then dropping to 6.7% in 1910). In terms of religion, in 1910 the majority were Roman Catholics (63.2%), followed by Protestants (34.5%), and Jews (1.9%). The village was also traditionally inhabited by Cieszyn Vlachs, speaking the Cieszyn Silesian dialect.

After World War I, the fall of Austria-Hungary and the division of Cieszyn Silesia in 1920, it became a part of Czechoslovakia. In 1931, Třinec was promoted to a town.

Following the Munich Agreement in October 1938, together with the Trans-Olza region, it was annexed by Poland, administratively adjoined to Cieszyn County of the Silesian Voivodeship. It was then annexed by Nazi Germany at the beginning of World War II. After the war, it was restored to Czechoslovakia.

In 1946, the municipalities of Lyžbice, Dolní Líštná, and Konská were joined to Třinec. Horní Líštná and Kojkovice were joined in 1959. In 1956–1977, a large housing estate was built in Lyžbice, and it became the most populated town part of Třinec. Afterwards, Lyžbice became a new downtown, taking the place of Staré Město (lit. 'old town').

The municipalities of Guty, Karpentná, Nebory, Oldřichovice, Ropice, Tyra and Vendryně were joined to Třinec in 1980. However, Vendryně became an independent municipality in 1995 and Ropice followed in 2000. In 2018, Třinec became a statutory city.

== Demographics ==
Třinec is an important cultural centre of the Polish minority in Trans-Olza, which makes up 12.1% of the population (as of 2021).

Historical population

Year	Pop.	±%
1869	7,484	—
1880	9,811	+31.1%
1890	11,201	+14.2%
1900	13,181	+17.7%
1910	14,187	+7.6%

Year	Pop.	±%
1921	16,112	+13.6%
1930	19,466	+20.8%
1950	21,610	+11.0%
1961	27,660	+28.0%
1970	36,154	+30.7%

Year	Pop.	±%
1980	39,750	+9.9%
1991	40,309	+1.4%
2001	38,953	−3.4%
2011	36,263	−6.9%
2021	33,782	−6.8%

Source: Censuses

== Economy ==
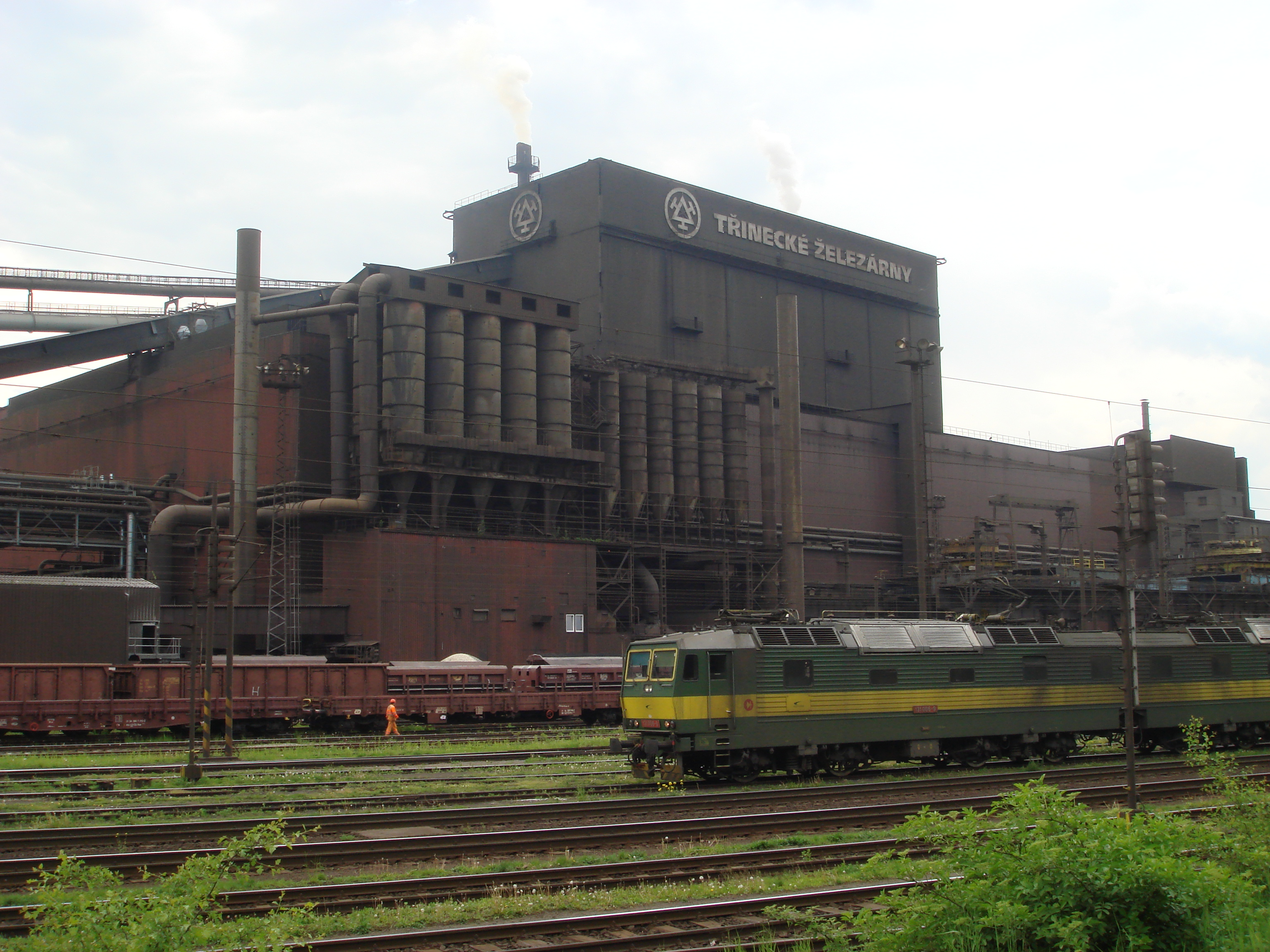
Třinec Iron and Steel Works

The Třinec Iron and Steel Works company is one of the most important and largest employers in the Czech Republic. After the collapse of the Ostrava ironworks in 2024, it remained the only steel producer in the country. Including smaller production plants outside Třinec, the company employs approximately 6,800 people (as of 2025).

== Transport ==
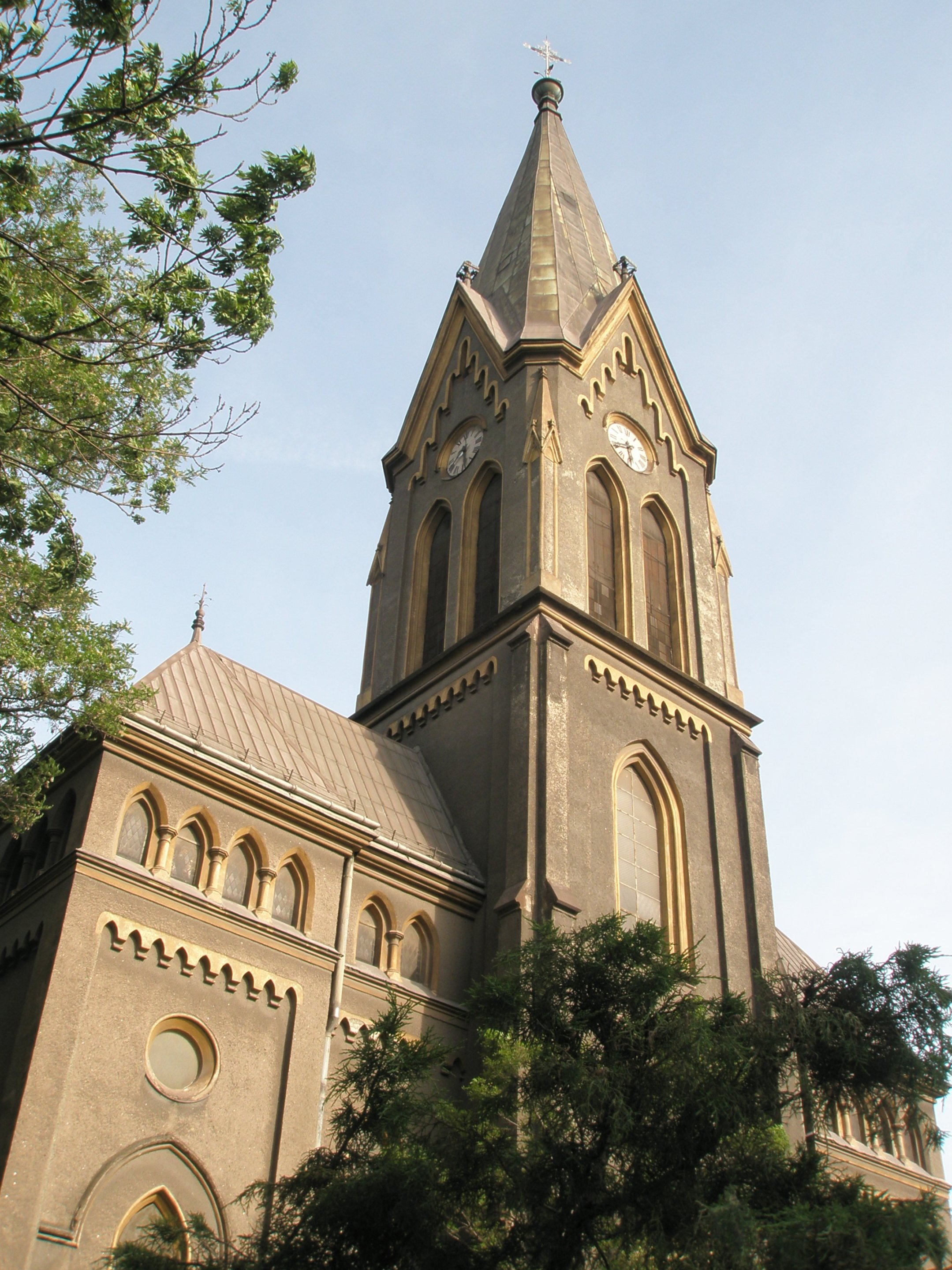
Evangelical church

The I/68 road (connecting the D48 motorway with the Czech–Polish state border at Mosty u Jablunkova) runs through the city.

Třinec is located on the railway lines Opava–Návsí via Ostrava and Ostrava–Mosty u Jablunkova. The city is served by three train stations: Třinec (Trzyniec), Třinec centrum (Trzyniec centrum) and Třinec-Konská (Trzyniec-Konska).

== Culture ==
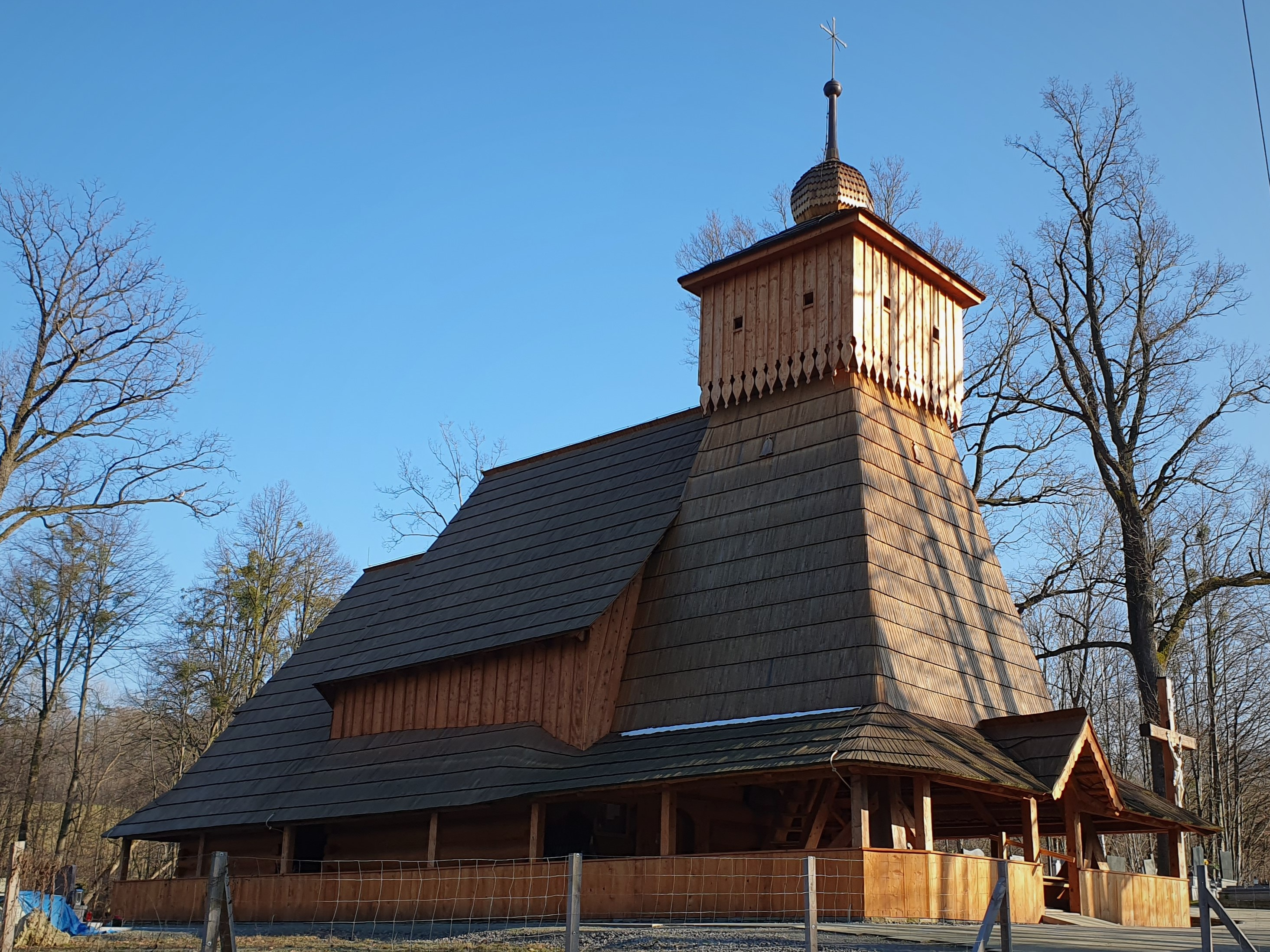
Replica of Church of Corpus Cristi

The year's biggest cultural event is Hutnický den ('Metallurgy Day'), which features numerous live performances from bands and artists from all over the country and abroad. It takes place every year in May, but was not held in 2020 and 2021.

From 1993 to 2012, one of the oldest and most famous rock festivals in the Czech Republic, Noc plná hvězd ('star-studded night'), was held here every year.

== Sport ==
The city is represented by the successful ice hockey team HC Oceláři Třinec, which has been playing in the Czech Extraliga since 1995 and has won six times. Oceláři (Steelers) play their home games at Werk Arena, which opened in 2014 and has a seating capacity of 5,400. The arena also hosted the Team Czech Republic at the 2016 Davis Cup World Group.

The city's football team, FK Třinec, plays in the Czech National Football League (second tier of the Czech football system).

The floorball club FBC Třinec has been playing in the first tier of the women's competition since 2023 and in the third tier of the men's competition. The team plays its home games in the Sports Hall STARS Třinec.

Třinec also has an athletics club, founded in 1951. Sports that have a tradition in Třinec include orienteering, weightlifting, Greco-Roman wrestling, road cycling, and chess.

== Sights ==
Třinec is poor in monuments. The main historic landmark is the Church of Saint Albert, built in the 1880s.

A notable building is the wooden Church of Corpus Cristi in Guty. The original church from the 16th century was destroyed by a deliberate fire in 2017. In 2021, a replica was completed on its site.

In 1969, Třinec Iron and Steel Works opened a company museum, which has been jointly operated with the city as the museum of both the company and the city since 1992.

== Notable people ==
- Jan Kubisz (1848–1920), Polish educator and poet
- Józef Buzek (1873–1936), Polish statistician and politician
- Jan Buzek (1874–1940), Polish medical doctor and politician
- Paweł Kubisz (1907–1968), Polish poet and writer
- Adam Wawrosz (1913–1971), Polish poet and writer
- Tadeusz Kraus (1932–2018), footballer
- Stanisław Zahradnik (born 1932), historian
- Eduard Ovčáček (born 1933), artist
- Karol Daniel Kadłubiec (born 1937), Polish ethnographer
- Michaela Dolinová (born 1964), actress and TV presenter
- Petr Šiška (born 1965), TV presenter and musician
- Petr Pravec (born 1967), astronomer
- Roman Sikora (born 1970), playwright
- Jana Cieslarová (born 1971), orienteer
- Edvard Lasota (born 1971), footballer
- Vojtěch Kučera (born 1975), poet
- Czeslaw Walek (born 1975), lawyer and LGBT activist
- Martin Staszko (born 1976), poker player
- Lenka Cenková (born 1977), tennis player
- David Szurman (born 1981), ice dancer
- Lukáš Rakowski (born 1982), figure skater
- Václav Svěrkoš (born 1983), footballer
- Tomáš Klus (born 1986), musician
- Soňa Pertlová (1988–2011), chess player
- Ewa Farna (born 1993), Polish-Czech singer
- Krystyna Pyszková (born 1999), model, Miss World 2023
- Adam Gawlas (born 2002), darts player

== Twin towns – sister cities ==
Třinec is twinned with:

- Bielsko-Biała, Poland
- Žilina, Slovakia
