= Petr Šiška =

Czech television presenter (born 1965)

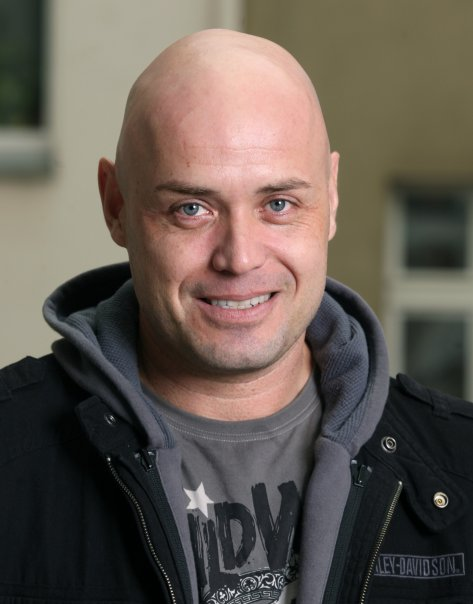
Petr Šiška

Petr Šiška (born 4 May 1965 in Třinec) is a Czech TV presenter, screenwriter, musician, and occasional songwriter.

He is currently the host of the Czech game show Nic než pravda on the Czech TV channel Prima, based on the American game show The Moment of Truth.

In addition to his television career, he is a successful songwriter, having written lyrics and music for singers such as Czech icon Karel Gott, Helena Vondráčková, Hana Zagorová, Leona Machálková, and others. He is also a member of the rock band Legendy se vrací (The Legends return).

Since 1997, Petr Šiška has been CEO and chairman of the board of directors of Petarda Production a.s., a production company that organizes benefit concerts, charity events, art exhibitions, and offers companies public relation services. The company also represents young talented artists and musicians.

In 2016, he was the screenwriter for The Fountain for Zuzana, a movie that pays tribute to the Czech-Polish-Slovak border area, its music, and to the musicians from all genres. Much of the film showed concert footage of famous groups and musicians like Jarek Nohavica, Peter Cmorik, and Roman Izzi Iziáš.
