= Mariusz Szyszka =

Polish footballer

Personal information
- Date of birth: 18 January 1988 (age 38)
- Place of birth: Oborniki, Poland
- Height: 1.84 m (6 ft 0 in)
- Position: Defender

Youth career
- 2003–2005: Sparta Oborniki
- 2006: Amica Wronki

Senior career*
Years	Team	Apps	(Gls)
2006–2007	Amica Wronki		
2007–2009	Lech Poznań	2	(0)
2008	→ Pogoń Szczecin (loan)	15	(0)
2009	→ Polonia Słubice (loan)	12	(0)
2009–2010	Nielba Wągrowiec	28	(0)
2010	Polonia Słubice	13	(0)
2011	Calisia Kalisz	7	(0)
2011	Lubuszanin Trzcianka	15	(2)
2012–2013	Sparta Oborniki		
2013	Świt Piotrowo		
- * Club domestic league appearances and goals

Mariusz Szyszka (born 18 January 1988) is a Polish former professional footballer who played as a defender.

== Career ==
He began his career at Sparta Oborniki, later joining Amica Wronki. He debuted for Lech Poznań in the Ekstraklasa on 24 November 2007, playing against ŁKS Łódź. Lech Poznań loaned him out to Pogoń Szczecin and Polonia Słubice during the 2008–09 season.

He then trialled for Nielba Wągrowiec and debuted against Gryf Kamień Pomorski, a 2–0 away win in the 2009-10 Polish Cup. He left the club at the end of the season in June 2010.

He then unsuccessfully trialled for Bałtyk Gdynia and Tur Turek, before returning to Polonia. In November 2010, after an unsuccessful trial with Pogoń Szczecin he left Polonia after termination of his contract.

At the age of 23, in February 2011, he trialled for Calisia Kalisz before being announced as a new signing. However he lasted only half a season before spells with lower league clubs Lubuszanin Trzcianka, Sparta Oborniki and Świt Piotrowo.

== Honours ==
Calisia Kalisz

- III liga Kuyavia-Pomerania – Greater Poland: 2010–11
