= Třinec Iron and Steel Works =

Czech producer of long rolled steel products

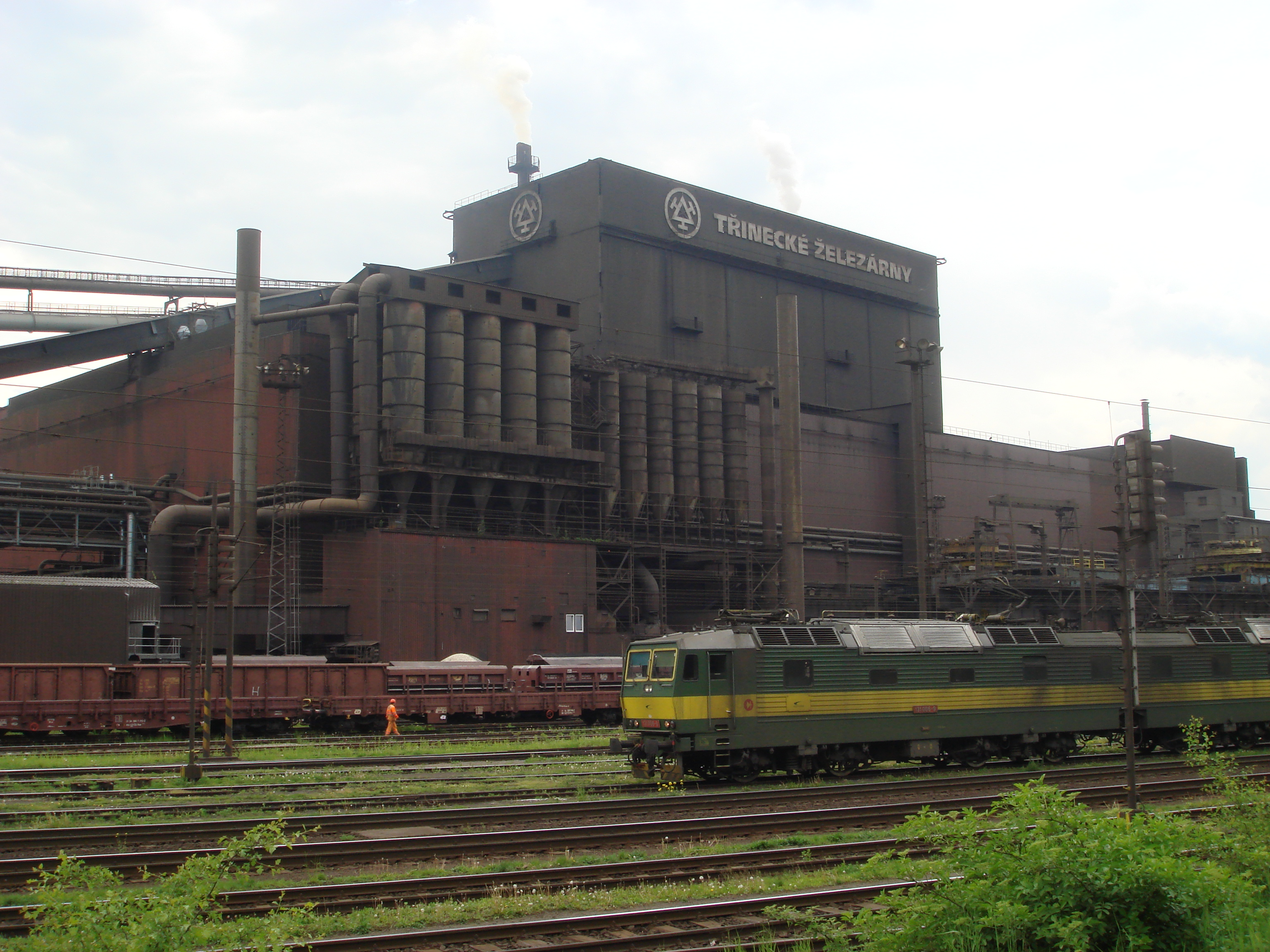
- The steelworks in Třinec
- Native name: Třinecké železárny, a. s.
- Type: Joint-stock company
- Industry: Steel industry
- Founded: 1839; 187 years ago
- Founder: Těšín Chamber
- Headquarters: 49°41′25″N 18°39′10″E, Třinec, Czech Republic
- Key people: Roman Heide (chairman and CEO)
- Products: Wire rod, steel bars, sections, rails and seamless tubes
- Production output: 2.424 million tonnes of crude steel (2025)
- Revenue: CZK 44.536 billion (2025)
- Net income: CZK 186 million (2025)
- Total assets: CZK 43.083 billion (2025)
- Total equity: CZK 32.268 billion (2025)
- Number of employees: 6,698 (2025)
- Parent: Moravia Steel
- Website: www.trz.cz/en/

Třinec Iron and Steel Works (TŽ; Czech: Třinecké železárny; Polish: Huta trzyniecka) is a steel producer based in Třinec, in the Moravian-Silesian Region of the Czech Republic. Founded in 1839, it is owned by Moravia Steel.

The company produces long steel products, including wire rod, steel bars, sections and rails, as well as seamless steel tubes. It is the largest steel producer in the Czech Republic, with crude steel output of 2.4 million tonnes annually.

== History ==
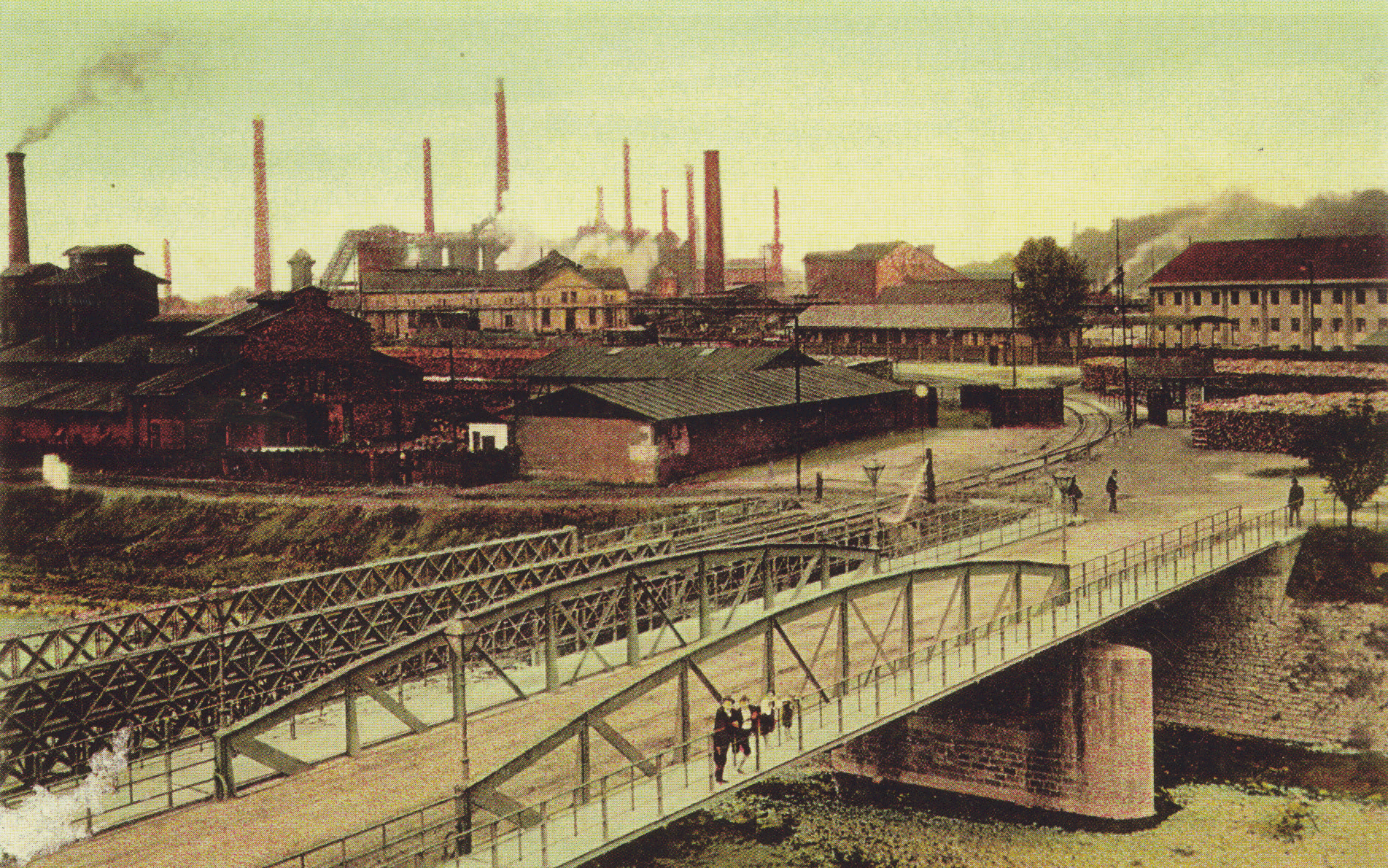
Třinec Iron and Steel Works in 1910

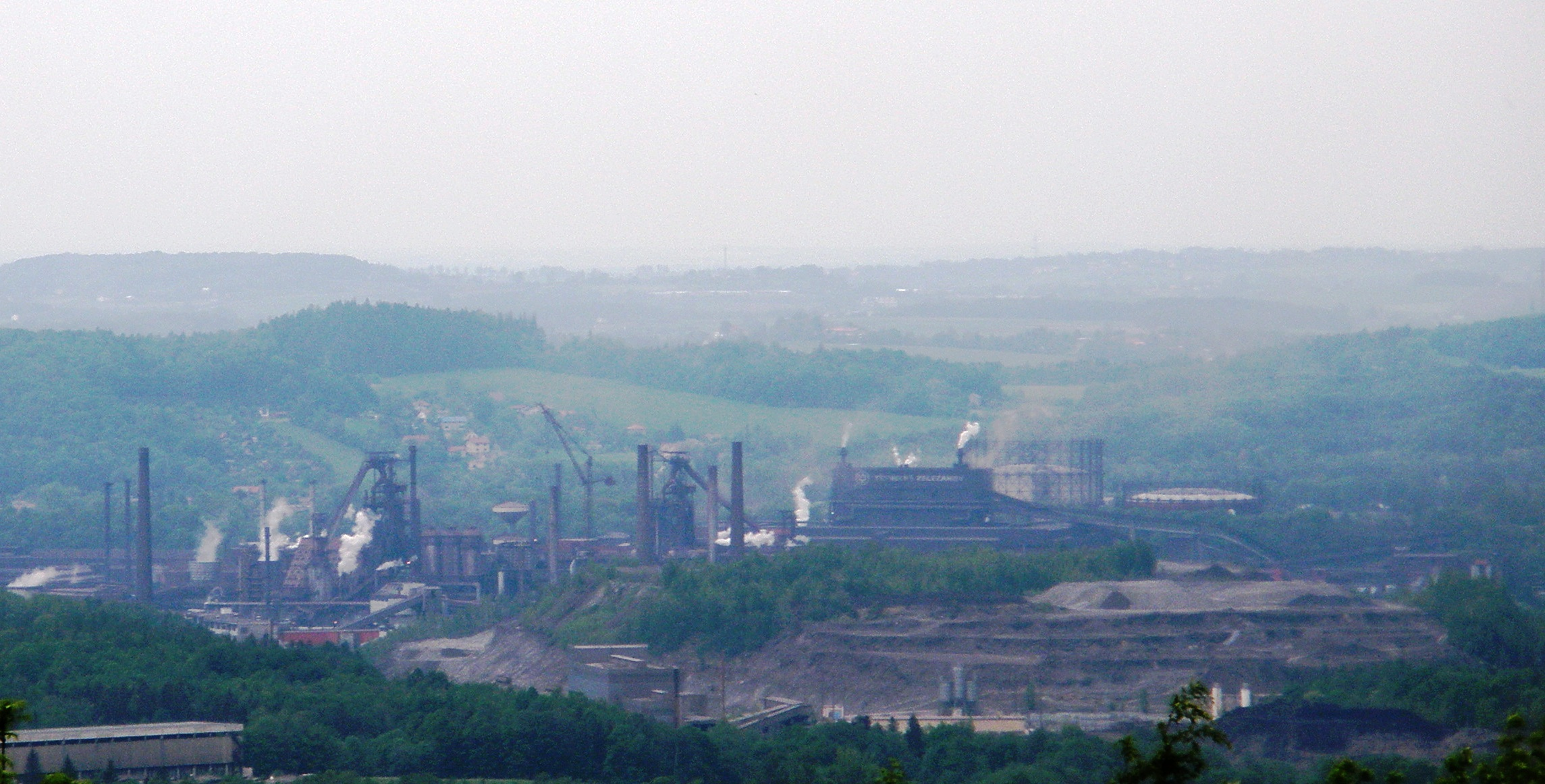
Třinec Iron and Steel Works today

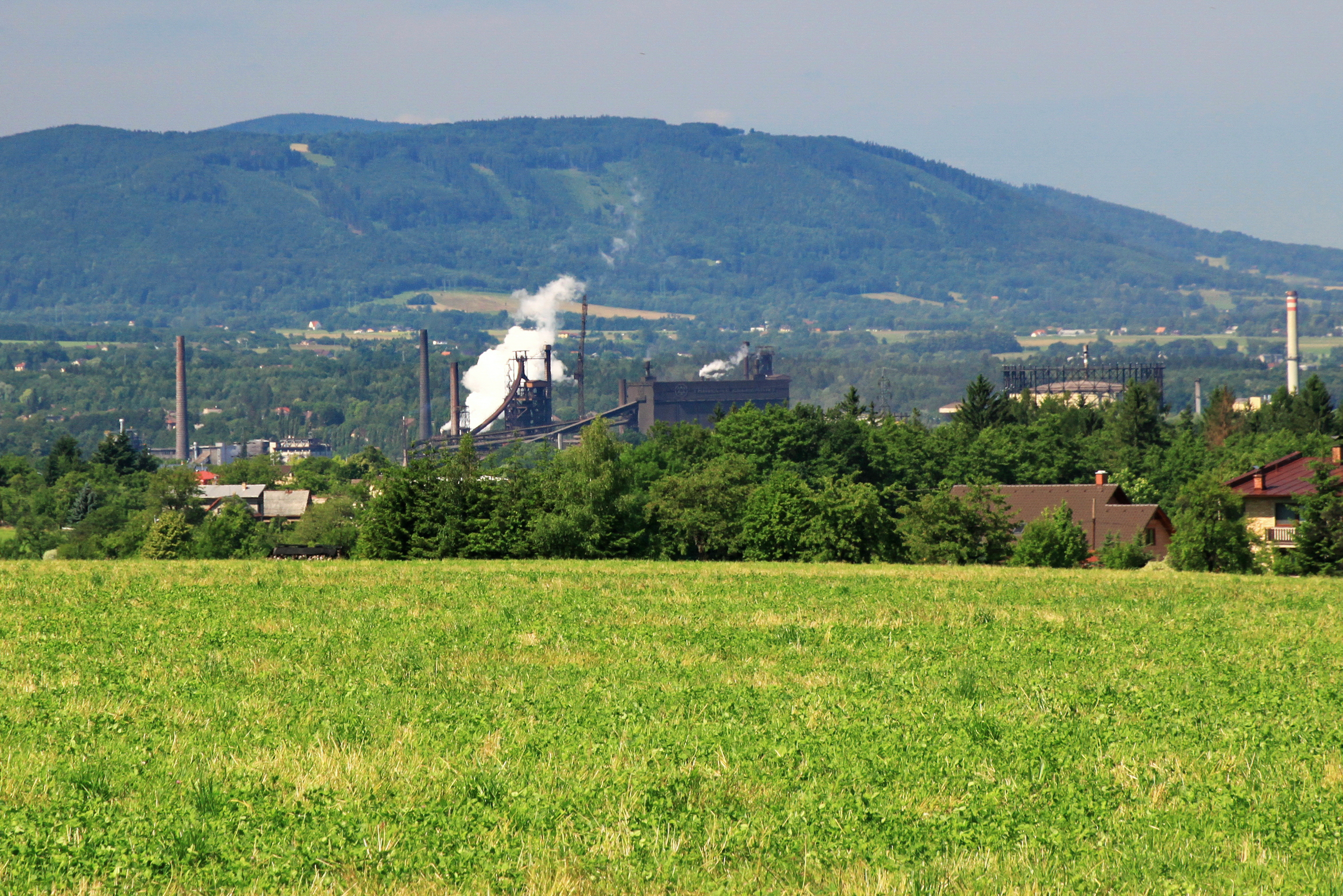
View of Třinec Iron and Steel Works and Moravian-Silesian Beskids

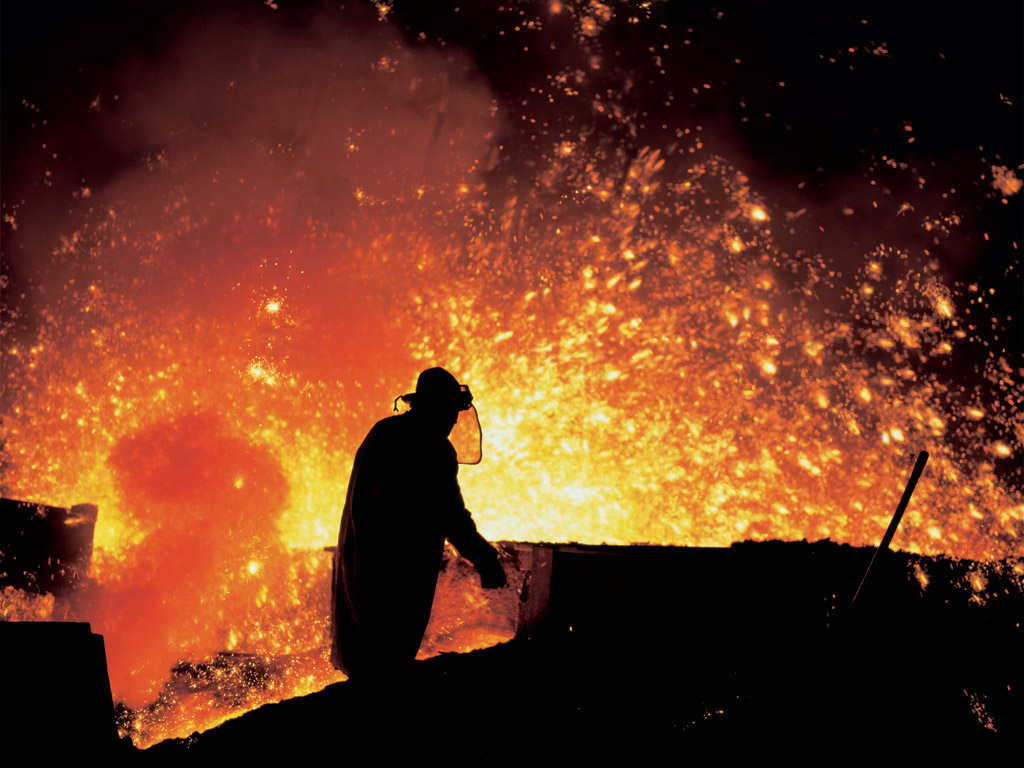
Blast furnaces of Třinec Iron and Steel Works

The area was rich in limestone, iron ore, clay and had a source of energy (the Olza River). The area also offered enough of a work force and it lies on a trade route from Slovakia, so a decision was taken to build an iron works at the location. In 1836 the construction of the first metallurgical furnace began. The iron mill began operating in 1839, becoming the largest in all of Cieszyn Silesia. At first, wood coal was used to heat the furnace; wood was cut in the nearby Silesian Beskids and Moravian-Silesian Beskids and floated on the Olza River in spring when the snow melted and the water level in the river rose. The Olza River was the most important means of transport until the 1870s, when the factories were modernized and a water canal was built to provide more water. The Olza River was also used to flush out the waste from the iron works. The first water cleaning facility was built in 1927. Modern water cleaning systems ensure that the outflow from the factory is nearly as clean as the inflow.

Since 1920, when Cieszyn Silesia was divided, it has been one of the most important industrial centers of Czechoslovakia. TŽ was nationalized in 1946 and its development continued during the Communist era, when heavy industry was very important. It is the largest steel mill in the country and still has a major impact on the industrial town of Třinec and surrounding areas, on its character, demographics and air pollution, although the latter significantly decreased since the fall of communism in 1989.

From 1960s to 1980s it played major role in the life of the region. Iron and steel works helped to improve regional infrastructure, as well as the transport network. Many recreational centers in the Beskids were built.

== Production ==
The Třinec works produces coke, iron and steel and rolls the steel into finished products. Most steel is made in basic oxygen converters, with a smaller quantity produced in electric arc furnaces. The company also operates a seamless tube mill in Ostrava-Vítkovice, a billet rolling mill in Kladno, a rolling mill in Bohumín and a steel drawing plant in Staré Město.

In 2025, the company produced 2.424 million tonnes of crude steel. Wire rod was its largest product by sales volume, at about 954,000 tonnes, followed by steel bars and sections at 482,000 tonnes. Sales of rails and railway accessories totalled 219,000 tonnes.

Exports accounts for over 60% of sales volumes of rolled and semi-finished products. The main export markets are Germany, Italy, Slovakia and Poland.

== See also ==
- Zaolzie
