= Tiran =

Tiran may refer to:

== Places ==
=== Iran ===
- Tiran, Iran (disambiguation)
- Tiran and Karvan County, county in Isfahan Province, Iran, with its capital Tiran
- Tiran, Iran, a city in Isfahan Province, Iran
- Tiran, Kerman, a village in Kerman Province, Iran
- Tiran, Lorestan, a village in Lorestan Province, Iran
- Tiran, Mazandaran, a village in Mazandaran Province, Iran
- Tiran, Razavi Khorasan, a village in Razavi Khorasan Province, Iran

=== Red Sea ===
- Tiran Island, an island at the mouth of the Gulf of Aqaba formerly administered by Egypt, but now administered by Saudi Arabia following a peaceful transfer in 2017
- Straits of Tiran, The opening to the Gulf of Aqaba in the Red Sea

== Personal name ==
First name / given name

- Tiran of Armenia, a 4th-century AD king of Armenia
- Tiran Alles, Sri Lankan businessmen, politician and MP
- Tiran Nersoyan (1904–1989), Armenian Apostolic Church clergyman, Patriarch-elect of the Armenian Patriarchate of Jerusalem briefly in 1957-1958
- Tiran Porter (born 1948), American bass and guitar player, vocalist and composer, member of The Doobie Brothers

Family name

- Itay Tiran (born 1980), Israeli stage and screen actor
- Virgil Tiran, Chicago-based American real estate developer
- Irena Yebuah Tiran (born 1974), Slovenian mezzo-soprano opera singer of Ghana descent

== Others ==
- Tiran tank, Israeli modification of T-54, T-55 and T-62 tanks

== See also ==
- Tirana, capital city of Albania
- Tirano, Italian municipality in Lombardy
- Diran (disambiguation)
- Tigran (disambiguation)
- Tira (disambiguation)
- TIR (disambiguation)
- Teerandaz (disambiguation)
