= Tiran, Iran (disambiguation) =

Tiran, Iran is a city in Isfahan Province, Iran

Esfid (Persian: تيران) may also refer to:

- Tiran, Kerman, a village in Kerman Province, Iran
- Tiran, Lorestan, a village in Lorestan Province, Iran
- Tiran, Mazandaran, a village in Mazandaran Province, Iran
- Tiran, Razavi Khorasan, a village in Razavi Khorasan Province, Iran
- Tiran and Karvan County, in Isfahan Province

== See also ==
- Tiran (disambiguation)
