= Tira =

Tira may refer to:

== Places ==
Place names derived from the word in Arabic word for "The fort", (Palmer, 1881, p.194)

- Tira, Israel, a city in Israel
- Al-Tira, Haifa, a village in the Haifa District, depopulated in 1948
- Al-Tira, Baysan, a village in the Beisan District, depopulated in 1948
- Al-Tira (Ramla), a village in the Ramla District, depopulated in 1948
- at-Tira (Ramallah), a Palestinian village in Ramallah and al-Bireh Governorate
- At Tiri, a village in Lebanon
- At-Tira, Suwayda, a village in Syria

=== Other places ===
- Tira, Texas, a town in Texas, United States
- Tira Sujanpur, a town in India
- Ţîra and Ţîra station, villages in Ghindeşti, Floreşti, Moldova

== Ethnic group and language ==
- Tira people, an ethnic group in Sudan
- Tira language, a Niger-Congo language in the Heiban family

== People with the surname ==
- Olia Tira, an East German-born Moldovan singer

== Other ==
- Tira (brand), an Indian beauty and personal care brand
- Tira (Soulcalibur), a fictional character in the Soul series of fighting games
- TIRA (System), a radar in Germany
- Traditional IRA, an individual retirement account
- PS TIRA, an Indonesian football club

== See also ==
- Tyra (disambiguation)
- Tireh (disambiguation)
- TIR (disambiguation)
- Tiran (disambiguation)
