= Sheykh Mostafa =

Sheykh Mostafa or Shaikh Mustafa (Persian: شيخ مصطفي) may refer to:

- Sheykh Mostafa, Kermanshah
- Sheykh Mostafa, Razavi Khorasan
