= Sarvelayat =

Sarvelayat (Persian: سرولایت) may refer to:

- Sarvelayat District
- Sarvelayat Rural District
