= Chakaneh =

Chakaneh (Persian: چكنه) may refer to:

- Chakaneh-ye Olya
- Chakaneh-ye Sofla
