= Talebi =

Talebi may refer to:

== People ==
- Talebi (surname)

== Places ==
- Talebi, Khoshab, a village in Khoshab County, Razavi Khorasan Province, Iran
- Talebi, Nishapur, a village in Nishapur County, Razavi Khorasan Province, Iran
