= Chakaneh-ye Olya =

Chakaneh-ye Olya چكنه عليا
- Village
- Location within Iran
- Coordinates: 36°50′35″N 58°28′37″E
- Country: Iran
- Province: Razavi Khorasan
- County: Nishapur
- Bakhsh: Sarvelayat
- Rural District: Sarvelayat

Population (2006)
  - Total: 329
- Time zone: UTC+3:30 (IRST)
  - Summer (DST): UTC+4:30 (IRDT)

Chakaneh-ye Olya (Persian: چكنه عليا, also Romanized as Chakaneh-ye ‘Olyā; also known as Chakaneh-ye Bālā) is a village in Sarvelayat Rural District, Sarvelayat District, Nishapur County, Razavi Khorasan Province, Iran. At the 2006 census, its population was 329, in 109 families.
