= Kalateh-ye Hajji, Razavi Khorasan =

Village in Razavi Khorasan province, Iran

Kalateh-ye Hajji Persian: كلاته حاجي
- Village
- Location within Iran
- Coordinates: 36°35′47″N 58°23′41″E
- Country: Iran
- Province: Razavi Khorasan
- County: Nishapur
- District: Sarvelayat
- Rural District: Barzanun

Population (2016)
  - Total: 58
- Time zone: UTC+3:30 (IRST)

Kalateh-ye Hajji (Persian: كلاته حاجي) (Note: Also romanized as Kalāteh-ye Ḩājjī) is a village in Barzanun Rural District of Sarvelayat District in Nishapur County, Razavi Khorasan province, Iran.

== Demographics ==
=== Population ===
At the time of the 2006 National Census, the village's population was 144 in 28 households. The following census in 2011 counted 115 people in 28 households. The 2016 census measured the population of the village as 58 people in 20 households.
