= Zohan, Razavi Khorasan =

Village in Razavi Khorasan province, Iran

Zohan Persian: زهان
- Village
- Location within Iran
- Coordinates: 36°39′56″N 58°15′36″E
- Country: Iran
- Province: Razavi Khorasan
- County: Nishapur
- District: Sarvelayat
- Rural District: Barzanun

Population (2016)
  - Total: 674
- Time zone: UTC+3:30 (IRST)

Zohan (Persian: زهان) (Note: Also romanized as Zahān and Zohān) is a village in Barzanun Rural District of Sarvelayat District in Nishapur County, Razavi Khorasan province, Iran.

== Demographics ==
=== Population ===
At the time of the 2006 National Census, the village's population was 966 in 225 households. The following census in 2011 counted 951 people in 279 households. The 2016 census measured the population of the village as 674 people in 215 households.
