= Fahneh, Nishapur =

Village in Razavi Khorasan province, Iran

Fahneh Persian: فهنه
- Village
- Location within Iran
- Coordinates: 36°54′14″N 58°25′01″E
- Country: Iran
- Province: Razavi Khorasan
- County: Nishapur
- District: Sarvelayat
- Rural District: Sarvelayat

Population (2016)
  - Total: 466
- Time zone: UTC+3:30 (IRST)

Fahneh (Persian: فهنه) (Note: Also known as Panāh and Zakhin) is a village in Sarvelayat Rural District of Sarvelayat District in Nishapur County, Razavi Khorasan province, Iran.

== Demographics ==
=== Population ===
At the time of the 2006 National Census, the village's population was 576 in 159 households. The following census in 2011 counted 553 people in 173 households. The 2016 census measured the population of the village as 466 people in 166 households.
