= Khvajehabad, Razavi Khorasan =

Village in Razavi Khorasan province, Iran

Khvajehabad Persian: خواجه اباد
- Village
- Location within Iran
- Coordinates: 36°47′37″N 58°21′37″E
- Country: Iran
- Province: Razavi Khorasan
- County: Nishapur
- District: Sarvelayat
- Rural District: Sarvelayat

Population (2016)
  - Total: 479
- Time zone: UTC+3:30 (IRST)

Khvajehabad (Persian: خواجه اباد) (Note: Also romanized as Khajeh Ābād and Khvājehābād) is a village in Sarvelayat Rural District of Sarvelayat District in Nishapur County, Razavi Khorasan province, Iran.

== Demographics ==
=== Population ===
At the time of the 2006 National Census, the village's population was 545 in 139 households. The following census in 2011 counted 533 people in 155 households. The 2016 census measured the population of the village as 479 people in 152 households.
