= Saqi Beyg =

Village in Razavi Khorasan province, Iran

Saqi Beyg Persian: ساقي بيگ
- Village
- Location within Iran
- Coordinates: 36°43′13″N 58°24′53″E
- Country: Iran
- Province: Razavi Khorasan
- County: Nishapur
- District: Sarvelayat
- Rural District: Sarvelayat

Population (2016)
  - Total: 492
- Time zone: UTC+3:30 (IRST)

Saqi Beyg (Persian: ساقي بيگ) (Note: Also romanized as Sāqī Beyg; also known as Sāqī Bag and Sāqī Beyk) is a village in Sarvelayat Rural District of Sarvelayat District in Nishapur County, Razavi Khorasan province, Iran.

== Demographics ==
=== Population ===
At the time of the 2006 National Census, the village's population was 719 in 214 households. The following census in 2011 counted 645 people in 248 households. The 2016 census measured the population of the village as 492 people in 191 households.
