= Sheykh Mostafa, Razavi Khorasan =

Sheykh Mostafa شيخ مصطفي
- Village
- Location within Iran
- Coordinates: 36°47′20″N 58°27′09″E
- Country: Iran
- Province: Razavi Khorasan
- County: Nishapur
- Bakhsh: Sarvelayat
- Rural District: Sarvelayat

Population (2006)
  - Total: 38
- Time zone: UTC+3:30 (IRST)
  - Summer (DST): UTC+4:30 (IRDT)

Sheykh Mostafa (Persian: شيخ مصطفي, also Romanized as Sheykh Moşţafá) is a village in Sarvelayat Rural District, Sarvelayat District, Nishapur County, Razavi Khorasan Province, Iran. At the 2006 census, its population was 38, in 12 families.
