= TIR =

Tir, tir or TIR may refer to:

- The modern Persian name for the Zoroastrian god Tishtrya
- Tir (month), of the Iranian calendar
- Tir (god), of ancient Armenia
- Tabar, Iran, a village in North Khorasan Province
- Old English spelling of the Norse god Týr
- Tir (demon), son of Iblis
- TIR (album), a 2010 album by Cerys Matthews

== Abbreviations ==
- Total internal reflection
- Tigrinya language, ISO 639 code
- Tirupati Airport, IATA code
- Translocated intimin receptor, used by E. coli
- TIR Convention, (Transit international routier, International Road Transport)
- Toll-Interleukin receptor
- Total indicator reading in metrology
- Thermal Infrared (TIR), also called intermediate infrared (IIR)

== Other ==
- Tir McDohl, in the video game Suikoden
- INS Tir, various ships of the Indian navy

== See also ==
- Tira (disambiguation)
- Tiran (disambiguation)
- Tir Planitia, a large basin on Mercury
- Tír na nÓg, an Otherworld in Irish mythology
