= Kelidar, Iran =

Village in Razavi Khorasan province, Iran

Kelidar Persian: كليدر
- Village
- Location within Iran
- Coordinates: 36°43′15″N 58°31′52″E
- Country: Iran
- Province: Razavi Khorasan
- County: Nishapur
- District: Sarvelayat
- Rural District: Sarvelayat

Population (2016)
  - Total: 405
- Time zone: UTC+3:30 (IRST)

Kelidar (Persian: كليدر) (Note: Also romanized as Kalīdar and Kelidār; also known as Kalīdar Zeyārat and Kilīd Dār) is a village in Sarvelayat Rural District of Sarvelayat District in Nishapur County, Razavi Khorasan province, Iran.

== Demographics ==
=== Population ===
At the time of the 2006 National Census, the village's population was 457 in 139 households. The following census in 2011 counted 491 people in 165 households. The 2016 census measured the population of the village as 405 people in 139 households.
