= Emamzadeh-ye Hoseyn Asghar =

Village in Razavi Khorasan province, Iran

Emamzadeh-ye Hoseyn Asghar Persian: امامزاده حسين اصغر
- Village
- Location within Iran
- Coordinates: 36°32′54″N 58°17′45″E
- Country: Iran
- Province: Razavi Khorasan
- County: Nishapur
- District: Sarvelayat
- Rural District: Barzanun

Population (2016)
  - Total: 0
- Time zone: UTC+3:30 (IRST)

Emamzadeh-ye Hoseyn Asghar (Persian: امامزاده حسين اصغر) (Note: Also romanized as Emāmzādeh-ye Ḩoseyn Āṣghar) is a village in Barzanun Rural District of Sarvelayat District in Nishapur County, Razavi Khorasan province, Iran.

== Demographics ==
=== Population ===
At the time of the 2006 National Census, the village's population was 51 in seven households. The village did not appear in the following census of 2011. The 2016 census measured the population of the village as zero.
