= Kheyrabad, Sarvelayat =

Village in Razavi Khorasan province, Iran

Kheyrabad Persian: خيراباد
- Village
- Location within Iran
- Coordinates: 36°38′08″N 58°14′25″E
- Country: Iran
- Province: Razavi Khorasan
- County: Nishapur
- District: Sarvelayat
- Rural District: Barzanun

Population (2016)
  - Total: 219
- Time zone: UTC+3:30 (IRST)

Kheyrabad (Persian: خيراباد) (Note: Also romanized as Kheyrābād) is a village in Barzanun Rural District of Sarvelayat District in Nishapur County, Razavi Khorasan province, Iran.

== Demographics ==
=== Population ===
At the time of the 2006 National Census, the village's population was 252 in 70 households. The following census in 2011 counted 248 people in 80 households. The 2016 census measured the population of the village as 219 people in 69 households.
