= Shotor Sang =

Village in Razavi Khorasan province, Iran

Shotor Sang Persian: شترسنگ
- Village
- Location within Iran
- Coordinates: 36°35′40″N 58°24′48″E
- Country: Iran
- Province: Razavi Khorasan
- County: Nishapur
- District: Sarvelayat
- Rural District: Barzanun

Population (2016)
  - Total: 114
- Time zone: UTC+3:30 (IRST)

Shotor Sang (Persian: شترسنگ) is a village in Barzanun Rural District of Sarvelayat District in Nishapur County, Razavi Khorasan province, Iran.

== Demographics ==
=== Population ===
At the time of the 2006 National Census, the village's population was 115 in 22 households. The following census in 2011 counted 101 people in 26 households. The 2016 census measured the population of the village as 114 people in 31 households.
