= Abdollah Givi =

Village in Razavi Khorasan province, Iran

Abdollah Givi Persian: عبداله گيوي
- Village
- Location within Iran
- Coordinates: 36°41′40″N 58°25′55″E
- Country: Iran
- Province: Razavi Khorasan
- County: Nishapur
- District: Sarvelayat
- Rural District: Sarvelayat

Population (2016)
  - Total: 487
- Time zone: UTC+3:30 (IRST)

Abdollah Givi (Persian: عبداله گيوي) (Note: Also romanized as ‘Abdollāh Gīvī; also known as ‘Abdollāh Gīv) is a village in, and the capital of, Sarvelayat Rural District in Sarvelayat District of Nishapur County, Razavi Khorasan province, Iran.

== Demographics ==
=== Population ===
At the time of the 2006 National Census, the village's population was 469 in 135 households. The following census in 2011 counted 600 people in 171 households. The 2016 census measured the population of the village as 487 people in 140 households.
