= Vaulin =

Vaulin is a surname. Notable people with the surname include:

- Alexey Vaulin (born 1974), Russian painter
- Peter Vaulin (1870–1943), Russian artist
