= Kuh Sakht =

Village in Razavi Khorasan province, Iran

Kuh Sakht Persian: كوه سخت
- Village
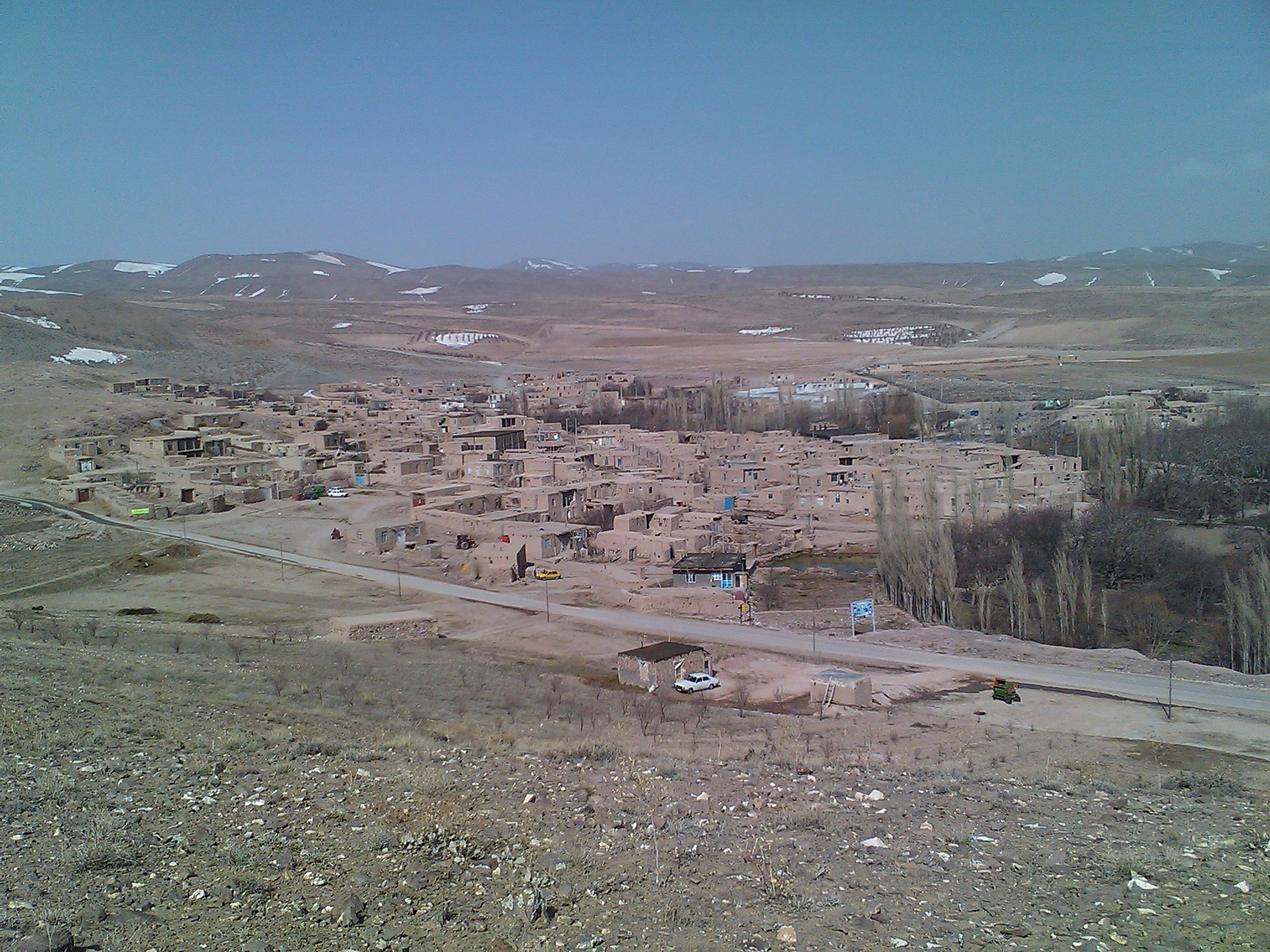
- The village of Kuh Sakht

- Location within Iran
- Coordinates: 36°54′07″N 58°19′11″E
- Country: Iran
- Province: Razavi Khorasan
- County: Nishapur
- District: Sarvelayat
- Rural District: Sarvelayat

Population (2016)
  - Total: 565
- Time zone: UTC+3:30 (IRST)

Kuh Sakht (Persian: كوه سخت) (Note: Also romanized as Kūh Sakht) is a village in Sarvelayat Rural District of Sarvelayat District in Nishapur County, Razavi Khorasan province, Iran.

== Demographics ==
=== Population ===
At the time of the 2006 National Census, the village's population was 754 in 195 households. The following census in 2011 counted 622 people in 197 households. The 2016 census measured the population of the village as 565 people in 205 households.
