= Soltan Meydan =

Village in Razavi Khorasan province, Iran

Soltan Meydan Persian: سلطان ميدان
- Village
- Location within Iran
- Coordinates: 36°44′09″N 58°25′34″E
- Country: Iran
- Province: Razavi Khorasan
- County: Nishapur
- District: Sarvelayat
- Rural District: Sarvelayat

Population (2016)
  - Total: 775
- Time zone: UTC+3:30 (IRST)

Soltan Meydan (Persian: سلطان ميدان) (Note: Also romanized as Solţān Meydān; also known as Sultān Maidān) is a village in Sarvelayat Rural District of Sarvelayat District in Nishapur County, Razavi Khorasan province, Iran.

== Demographics ==
=== Population ===
At the time of the 2006 National Census, the village's population was 865 in 223 households. The following census in 2011 counted 1,005 people in 296 households. The 2016 census measured the population of the village as 775 people in 247 households, the most populous in its rural district.
