= Gavkosh, Razavi Khorasan =

Village in Razavi Khorasan province, Iran

Gavkosh Persian: گاوكش
- Village
- Location within Iran
- Coordinates: 36°36′46″N 58°21′12″E
- Country: Iran
- Province: Razavi Khorasan
- County: Nishapur
- District: Sarvelayat
- Rural District: Barzanun

Population (2016)
  - Total: 120
- Time zone: UTC+3:30 (IRST)

Gavkosh (Persian: گاوكش) (Note: Also romanized as Gāvkosh) is a village in Barzanun Rural District of Sarvelayat District in Nishapur County, Razavi Khorasan province, Iran.

== Demographics ==
=== Population ===
At the time of the 2006 National Census, the village's population was 173 in 39 households. The following census in 2011 counted 135 people in 42 households. The 2016 census measured the population of the village as 120 people in 46 households.
