= Barzanun =

Village in Razavi Khorasan province, Iran

Barzanun Persian: برزنون
- Village
- Location within Iran
- Coordinates: 36°36′24″N 58°17′25″E
- Country: Iran
- Province: Razavi Khorasan
- County: Nishapur
- District: Sarvelayat
- Rural District: Barzanun

Population (2016)
  - Total: 2,985
- Time zone: UTC+3:30 (IRST)

Barzanun (Persian: برزنون) (Note: Also romanized as Barzanūn and Borzenūn) is a village in, and the capital of, Barzanun Rural District in Sarvelayat District of Nishapur County, Razavi Khorasan province, Iran.

== Demographics ==
=== Population ===
At the time of the 2006 National Census, the village's population was 3,571 in 864 households. The following census in 2011 counted 3,508 people in 1,014 households. The 2016 census measured the population of the village as 2,985 people in 912 households, the most populous in its rural district.
