= Khayesk =

Village in Razavi Khorasan province, Iran

Khayesk Persian: خايسك
- Village
- Location within Iran
- Coordinates: 36°52′10″N 58°13′42″E
- Country: Iran
- Province: Razavi Khorasan
- County: Nishapur
- District: Sarvelayat
- Rural District: Sarvelayat

Population (2016)
  - Total: 437
- Time zone: UTC+3:30 (IRST)

Khayesk (Persian: خايسك) (Note: Also romanized as Khāyesk) is a village in Sarvelayat Rural District of Sarvelayat District in Nishapur County, Razavi Khorasan province, Iran.

== Demographics ==
=== Population ===
At the time of the 2006 National Census, the village's population was 495 in 99 households. The following census in 2011 counted 455 people in 113 households. The 2016 census measured the population of the village as 437 people in 120 households.
