= Qareh Gol, Razavi Khorasan =

Village in Razavi Khorasan province, Iran

Qareh Gol Persian: قره گل
- Village
- Location within Iran
- Coordinates: 36°38′24″N 58°19′00″E
- Country: Iran
- Province: Razavi Khorasan
- County: Nishapur
- District: Sarvelayat
- Rural District: Barzanun

Population (2016)
  - Total: 176
- Time zone: UTC+3:30 (IRST)

Qareh Gol (Persian: قره‌گل) is a village in Barzanun Rural District of Sarvelayat District in Nishapur County, Razavi Khorasan province, Iran.

== Demographics ==
=== Population ===
At the time of the 2006 National Census, the village's population was 301 in 63 households. The following census in 2011 counted 232 people in 78 households. The 2016 census measured the population of the village as 176 people in 54 households.
