= Tigran Maytesian =

Armenian-born classical violinist (born 1970)

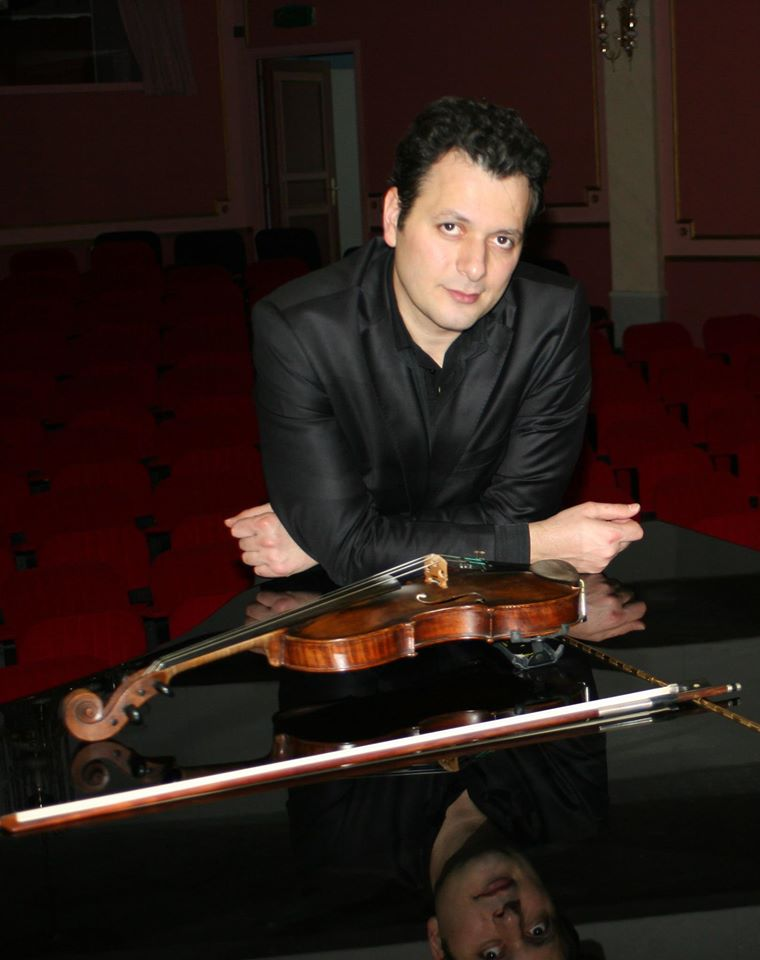

Background information
- Born: 10 November 1970 (age 55); Sevan, Armenia
- Genres: Classical music
- Occupation: Violinist
- Instrument: Violin
- Years active: 1979–present
- Website: tigmaywebsite.wixsite.com/website

Tigran Maytesian (Russian: Тигран Дереникович Майтесян; born November 10, 1970) is an Armenian-born Russian-Belgian classical violinist, Doctor of Arts. He is a soloist and chamber musician, a professor, past artistic director of the International Festival des Minimes in Brussels, the International Festival Sint Carolus Borromeuskerk in Antwerp and the International Festival at the Cathédrale Notre-Dame-de-la-Treille de Lille, France, and currently artistic director of the Festival St Andrieskerk in Antwerp, Festival Catharina and Festival Chapel for Europe in Brussels, a scientific researcher and consultant who resides and works in Belgium.

At KU Leuven’s Laboratory for Neuro- and Psychophysiology, Maytesian collaborates with Professor Marc Van Hulle’s research group on the Mindspeller project, exploring music as a communication channel in EEG-based brain-computer interfaces.

In 2011, Maytesian founded the Mind Speller Chamber Orchestra, which he conducts and with which he also performs as a violin soloist.

== Life and music studies ==
Maytesian was born in Sevan, Armenia.

Maytesian began his musical education in Yerevan, Armenia, where he studied at the Arno Babadjanian Musical and Pedagogical College from 1986 to 1990.

From 1990 to 1995, he studied at the Komitas State Conservatory in Yerevan. From 1993 to 1995, he also studied violin performance at the Estonian Academy of Music and Theatre in Tallinn as part of an exchange programme. During this period, he studied with Igor Bezrodny, a pupil of Abram Yampolsky and a representative of the Russian violin school.

Since then, Maytesian has followed the traditions of the Russian violin school, emphasizing technical control, a relaxed playing technique, sound production and artistic freedom.

From 1995 to 1997, he pursued postgraduate studies at the Moscow State Tchaikovsky Conservatory.

In 2013, Maytesian completed his dissertation Russian-French-Belgian Musical Relations: The Interaction of Violin Schools in the field of theory and history of art.

== Career and concerts ==
Maytesian began his professional orchestral career as a teenager. From 1987 to 1998, he served as concertmaster (first violin) of the orchestra of the State Radio and Television of Armenia under conductor Gevorg Adzhemian. From 1993 onwards, following invitations from Estonian Radio’s Fourth Station and the Estonian Conservatory, he also performed regularly in Scandinavia.

Maytesian has lived in Belgium since 2000. From 2000 to 2007, he served as first violin of the National Chamber Orchestra of the Grand Duchy of Luxembourg.

He has appeared in recitals and orchestral concerts in Russia, Armenia, Ukraine, Belarus, Kazakhstan and Israel, as well as in several European countries, including Finland, Estonia, Luxembourg, Belgium, Poland, Slovakia, the Netherlands and France.

Throughout his career, Maytesian collaborated with many prominent conductors such as Gevorg Adzhemian (Armenia), Yuri Alperten (Estonia), Alexander Yakupov, Andrey Krouzhkov, Igor Lerman, Andrey Karapishchenko (Russia), Vyacheslav Prilepin, Alexander Sosnovsky (Belarus), Jeannot Vaymerskirch (Luxemburg), Chen Xi Ze (Tsitsihar Philharmonic Orchestra, China), Hwang Eun Seok (Geoje, South Korea).

Daniel Blumenthal (Belgium) is one of the pianists accompanying him on a regular basis. Among other pianists with whom he gave concerts in different countries are Elisabeth Ginsburg (Moscow, Russia), Andrey Krouzhkov (Moscow, Russia), Marrit Gerets (Estonia), Luba Harutyunyan (Belgium), Ruben Chakhmakhchyan (Armenia), Joseph Ermin (Ukraine), Young Woong Cho and Mokpo (South Korea).

In 2011 Maytesian has founded the "Mind Speller" Chamber Orchestra, which developed from a string quartet. He has served as its conductor and has also appeared with the ensemble as a violin soloist.

In 2012 he became artistic director of the International Festival des Minimes in Brussels (Belgium) upon invitation by Abbé Jacques Van der Biest, honorary citizen of the city of Brussels, and by Prince Amaury de Merode, President of the "Centre d'Oeuvres de Merode" (Brussels, Belgium). He continued and expanded this initiative in 2013, to include also the International Festival Sint Carolus Borromeuskerk in Antwerp (Belgium) and the International Festival at the Cathédrale Notre-Dame-de-la-Treille de Lille, France. Starting from 2016, Maytesian has been acting as artistic director of the non-profitable musical association Pro Musica Pulchra guiding a series of music festivals: Festival Catharina in Brussels, Festival St.Andrieskerk in Antwerp and Festival Chapel for Europe in Brussels with participation of young talented musicians from different countries.

Tigran Maytesian has participated in various music festivals, including International Classical Music Festival "January Music Nights" in Brest, Belarus in 2013.

Between 2022 and 2025, Maytesian gave recitals, performed with orchestras and conducted master classes in several regions of South Korea.

In 2026, Maytesian continued his European concert activity with the project Flying Sound – Klang. Emotion. Präzision, including performances with pianist Daniel Blumenthal at the Herkulessaal in Munich on 15 March and at Die Glocke in Bremen on 30 May.

=== Selected collaborations and premieres ===
Maytesian developed a close artistic association with Russian composer Sergei Slonimsky, whose Spring Concerto for violin and orchestra became part of his concert repertoire. After hearing Maytesian perform the work at a Moscow festival marking Slonimsky’s 85th birthday, the composer wrote that he had heard his concerto performed in the interpretative conception he had originally envisioned.Maytesian subsequently performed the work at the Slonimsky Gala at the Grand Hall of the Moscow Conservatory in 2019.

On 30 April 2015, Maytesian gave the world premiere of Vache Sharafyan’s Measurements of Infinity at KU Leuven, performing the work with the composer at the piano. The composition had been commissioned for KU Leuven in commemoration of the centenary of the Armenian Genocide.

He performs with a violin from the 17th century Italian master Nicola Amati and a violin from the 18th century Italian master Giuseppe Guarneri

== Pedagogue ==
Since 2008, Maytesian has taught at the Lemmens Institute in Leuven (Lemmensinstituut – Conservatory of the Catholic University Leuven,Belgium) where he has been responsible for solo violin and chamber music classes. He became professor there in 2009.

Alongside his performance career, he has trained students for international violin and chamber music competitions and regularly gives master classes in Belgium, Russia, Armenia, Kazakhstan and other countries. Among his students is violinist Haik Kazazyan, who studied with Maytesian from 2011 to 2012.

== Scientific research ==
Maytesian is affiliated with KU Leuven’s Laboratory for Neuro- and Psychophysiology, where he works as a research fellow. He collaborates with Professor Marc Van Hulle’s research group on the Mindspeller project at the Catholic University Leuven (Katholieke Universiteit Leuven), exploring music as a communication channel in EEG-based brain-computer interfaces.

The Mindspeller research investigates brain-computer interfaces based on electroencephalography (EEG), including applications for communication in people with motor or communication impairments. Maytesian’s contribution focuses in particular on the relationship between music, emotion and EEG-based communication.

The ultimate aim is to develop an "affective brain–computer interface" with which patients with language disorders, due to neurological diseases such aphasia, autism, and dementia, can express their emotions via EEG without using facial expressions, gestures or other forms of muscular activity. Professor Maytesian has successfully promoted this project at universities in Belarus, Armenia and Russia (Moscow).

Maytesian is a Doctor of Arts (Russia) and, since 2013, a scientific advisor for Scientific Center of Interdisciplinary research of Musical creativity of the Moscow Conservatory.

== Honours and awards ==
Maytesian is an honorary doctor and a member of Arts department at the International Academy for Natural and Social Sciences, an honorary member of the Ararat International Academy of Sciences (Paris, France) and a regular member of the Europäische Akademie der Naturwissenschaften(Hannover, Germany).

Klassiek Centraal nominated the performance of Maytesian with Russian Camerata, the Chamber Orchestra of Tver Philharmonics, under the direction of Andrey Krouzhkov, in February 2014 as the Best Concert of the year and awarded them the Goulden Label prize.
