= Al-Tira, Baysan =

Al-Tira الطيرة
- Village
- Etymology: "The Fort of Abu Amran"
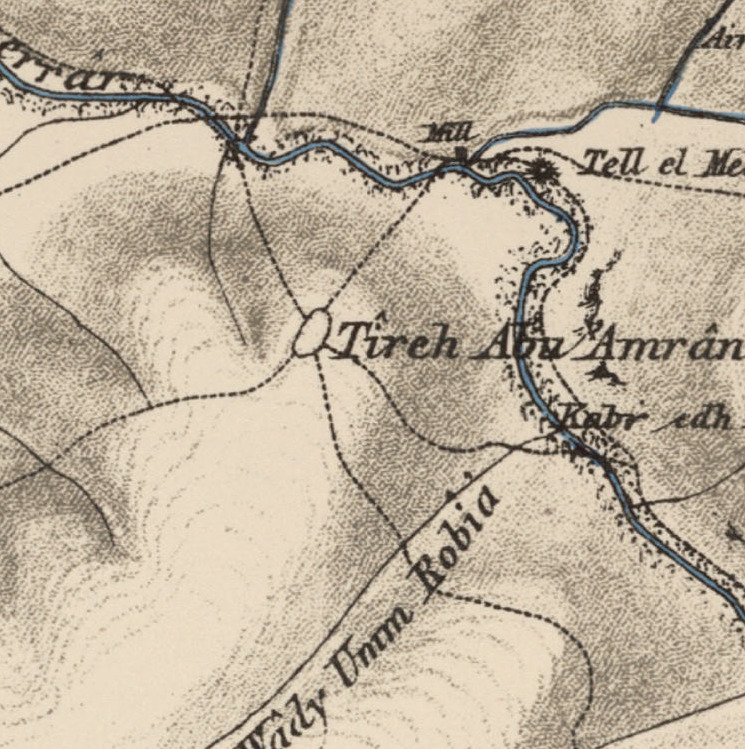
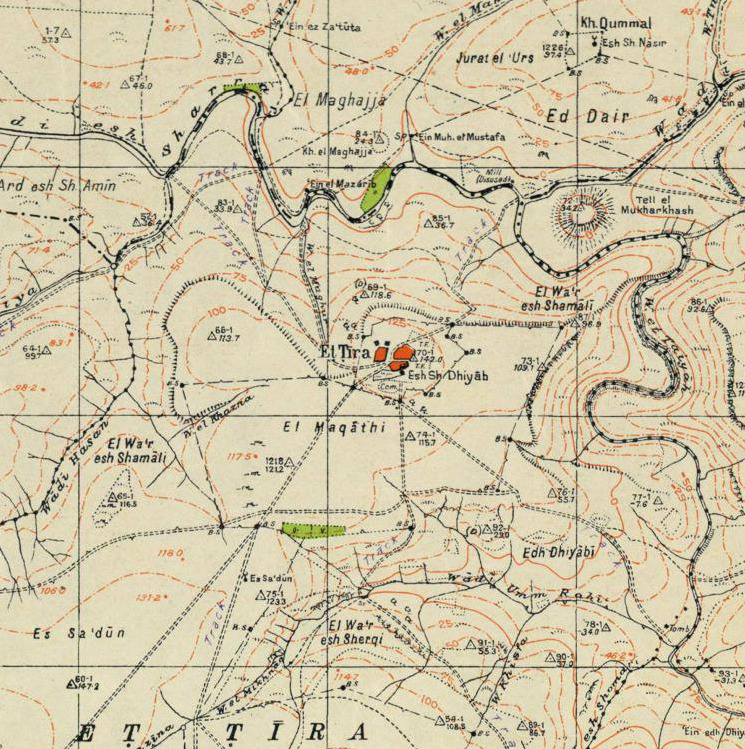
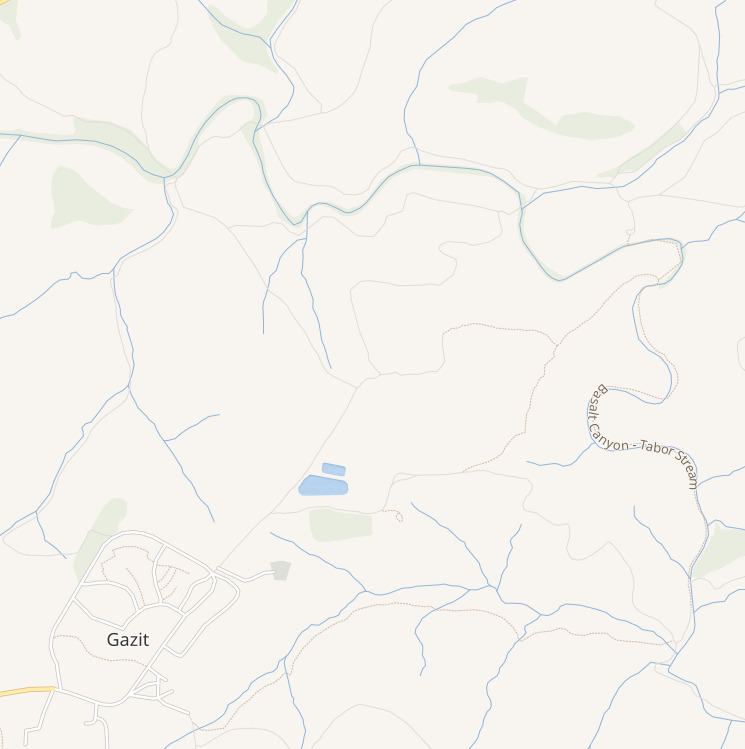
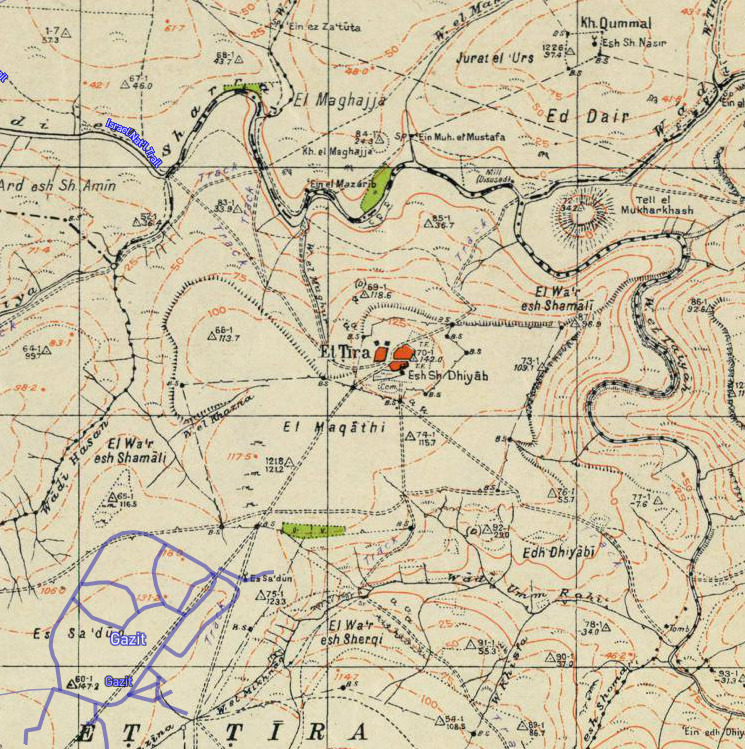
- 1870s map 1940s map modern map 1940s with modern overlay map A series of historical maps of the area around Al-Tira, Baysan (click the buttons)

- Location within Mandatory Palestine
- Coordinates: 32°38′52″N 35°27′26″E
- Palestine grid: 193/228
- Geopolitical entity: Mandatory Palestine
- Subdistrict: Baysan
- Date of depopulation: 15 April 1948

Area
  - Total: 10,207 dunams (10.207 km^{2}; 3.941 sq mi)

Population (1945)
  - Total: 150
- Cause(s) of depopulation: Whispering campaign
- Current Localities: Gazit

See Tira for other sites with similar names.

Al-Tira (Arabic: الطيرة), was a Palestinian Arab village in the District of Baysan. It was depopulated by the Israel Defense Forces during the 1947–48 Civil War in Mandatory Palestine on 15 April 1948 as part of Operation Gideon under the command of Yosef Weitz. It was located 17.5 km north of Baysan overlooking Wadi al-Bira. However, 'Ayn al-Bayda' was the main source of drinking water for al-Tira inhabitants.

== History ==
It has been suggested that this was Atara of the list of Thothmes III.

In 1517 al-Tra was incorporated into the Ottoman Empire with the rest of Palestine. During the 16th and 17th centuries, it belonged to the Turabay Emirate (1517-1683), which encompassed also the Jezreel Valley, Haifa, Jenin, Beit She'an Valley, northern Jabal Nablus, Bilad al-Ruha/Ramot Menashe, and the northern part of the Sharon plain.

In 1875, Victor Guérin climbed a small hill to reach the Al-Tira village. It consisted of about a dozen houses, built of adobe or assorted materials. In 1882, the PEF's Survey of Western Palestine described it as: "A small village, principally of adobe, on a hill-top, above a deep gorge. The water appears to be brought from the springs in the valley."

=== British Mandate era ===
In the 1922 census of Palestine, conducted by the Mandatory Palestine authorities, Tireh had a population of 130 Muslims, decreasing in the 1931 census to 108, still all Muslims, in 24 houses.

In the 1945 statistics the population of Et Tira and Irgun Borokhov was 200; 150 Arabs and 50 Jews, while the total land area was 10,207 dunams, according to an official land and population survey. Of this, Arabs used 54 dunums for plantations and irrigable land, 4,326 for cereals, while 29 dunums were classified as built-up (urban) land.

=== 1948, aftermath ===
In his diary, Weitz wrote of the inhabitants of Qumya and Al-Tira in the Baysan valley on the 26 March 1948:

"Not taking upon themselves the responsibility of preventing the infiltration of irregulars ... They must be forced to leave their villages until peace comes.

In order to block the return of the villagers, the kibbutz Gazit was established on the land of village land in September 1948, 1.5 km southwest of the village site.

In 1992 the village site was described: "The ruins of stone houses, covered with grass and thorns, are all that remain of al-Tira. The site is fenced in and servers Israeli farmers as pasture land. Cupress trees grow on surrounding land."

== Bibliography ==
- Barron, J.B., ed. (1923). Palestine: Report and General Abstracts of the Census of 1922. Government of Palestine.
- Conder, C.R. (1876). "Palestine before Joshua". Quarterly Statement - Palestine Exploration Fund. 8 (3): 140–148. doi:10.1179/peq.1876.8.3.140.
- Conder, C.R.; Kitchener, H.H. (1882). The Survey of Western Palestine: Memoirs of the Topography, Orography, Hydrography, and Archaeology. Vol. 2. London: Committee of the Palestine Exploration Fund.
- Government of Palestine, Department of Statistics (1945). Village Statistics, April, 1945.
- Guérin, V. (1880). Description Géographique Historique et Archéologique de la Palestine (in French). Vol. 3: Galilee, pt. 1. Paris: L'Imprimerie Nationale.
- Hadawi, S. (1970). Village Statistics of 1945: A Classification of Land and Area ownership in Palestine. Palestine Liberation Organization Research Center. Archived from the original on 2018-12-08.
- Khalidi, W. (1992). All That Remains: The Palestinian Villages Occupied and Depopulated by Israel in 1948. Washington D.C.: Institute for Palestine Studies. ISBN 0-88728-224-5.
- Mills, E., ed. (1932). Census of Palestine 1931. Population of Villages, Towns and Administrative Areas. Jerusalem: Government of Palestine.
- Morris, B. (2004). The Birth of the Palestinian Refugee Problem Revisited. Cambridge University Press. ISBN 978-0-521-00967-6.
- Palmer, E.H. (1881). The Survey of Western Palestine: Arabic and English Name Lists Collected During the Survey by Lieutenants Conder and Kitchener, R. E. Transliterated and Explained by E.H. Palmer. Committee of the Palestine Exploration Fund.
