= Tira (brand) =

Indian beauty and personal care brand

- Type: Subsidiary
- Industry: E-commerce; Cosmetics retail; Beauty retail
- Founded: April 5, 2023; 3 years ago
- Headquarters: Mumbai, India
- Area served: India
- Key people: Isha Ambani (Executive director)
- Products: Makeup, Skincare, Haircare, Fragrances
- Number of employees: 200+ (2023)
- Parent: Reliance Retail (Reliance Industries)
- Website: Official website

Tira is an Indian beauty and personal care retail brand owned by Reliance Retail. Headquartered in Mumbai, the brand was established in April 2023 and operates through physical stores and an e-commerce website.

== History ==
In April 2023, Reliance Retail launched Tira with an online platform and a physical store at Jio World Drive in Mumbai. The brand is managed by Reliance Retail under the leadership of Isha Ambani.

In 2024, the platform began retailing brands including 82°E, co-founded by Deepika Padukone, and SKIN1004. In October 2024, the skincare brand 9Skin, co-founded by Nayanthara, was added to its digital and physical channels. In 2025, Tira added the South Korean brand TIRTIR and launched its first private-label line of colour cosmetics. As of 2026, the company's portfolio includes international brands such as NARS Cosmetics, Fenty Beauty, and Milktouch. In November 2024, the company opened a flagship store at Jio World Plaza in Mumbai, comprising 15 shop in shop boutiques.

== Operations ==
Tira's product categories include makeup, skincare, haircare, and fragrances. The company maintains retail locations in Indian cities including Mumbai, New Delhi, Bangalore, Pune, Hyderabad, and Chennai.

== Partnerships and acquisitions ==
In 2023, the company partnered with Amorepacific Corporation for the distribution of its brands in India. In November 2023, Reliance Retail acquired the Indian operations of Sephora from Arvind Fashions for approximately ₹99 crore, assuming control of 26 stores. Reliance also acquired the Indian rights for the Italian brand Kiko Milano from DLF Brands.

In January 2026, the company partnered with South Korean cosmetics brand Hince to introduce the brand in the Indian market.

In February 2026, Tira introduced South Korean dermo-cosmetic brand Medicube in India through its retail and online platforms.

In May 2026, Tira introduced UK-based brand FACEGYM in India through a shop-in-shop outlet at its Kemp’s Corner store in Mumbai. The launch followed a minority investment in FACEGYM by Reliance Retail Ventures in 2025. In July 2026, the company entered into an exclusive distribution agreement with South Korean skincare brand Dr. Melaxin, retailing its product lines via Tira's e-commerce platform and select physical locations.

== Brand ambassadors ==
The company has appointed actors Kareena Kapoor, Kiara Advani, and Suhana Khan as brand ambassadors. In 2026, the company added Ahaan Panday as an ambassador for its men’s grooming and skincare category.

== Sponsorships ==
In 2025, TIRA partnered with Vogue India for the Vogue Beauty & Wellness Honours 2025, an awards programme recognizing achievements in the beauty and wellness sector. The same year, TIRA was the title sponsor of the Grazia Fashion Awards 2025, a fashion awards event organized by Grazia India in Mumbai.

== Awards and recognition ==
- 2025: VM&RD Retail Design Awards
