= Talebi, Nishapur =

Village in Razavi Khorasan province, Iran

Talebi Persian: طالبي
- Village
- Location within Iran
- Coordinates: 36°41′15″N 58°18′30″E
- Country: Iran
- Province: Razavi Khorasan
- County: Nishapur
- District: Sarvelayat
- Rural District: Sarvelayat

Population (2016)
  - Total: 567
- Time zone: UTC+3:30 (IRST)

Talebi (Persian: طالبي) (Note: Also romanized as Ţālebī) is a village in Sarvelayat Rural District of Sarvelayat District in Nishapur County, Razavi Khorasan province, Iran.

== Demographics ==
=== Population ===
At the time of the 2006 National Census, the village's population was 674 in 178 households. The following census in 2011 counted 689 people in 201 households. The 2016 census measured the population of the village as 567 people in 188 households.
