= Gazit =

Gazit: גָּזִית (Hebrew)
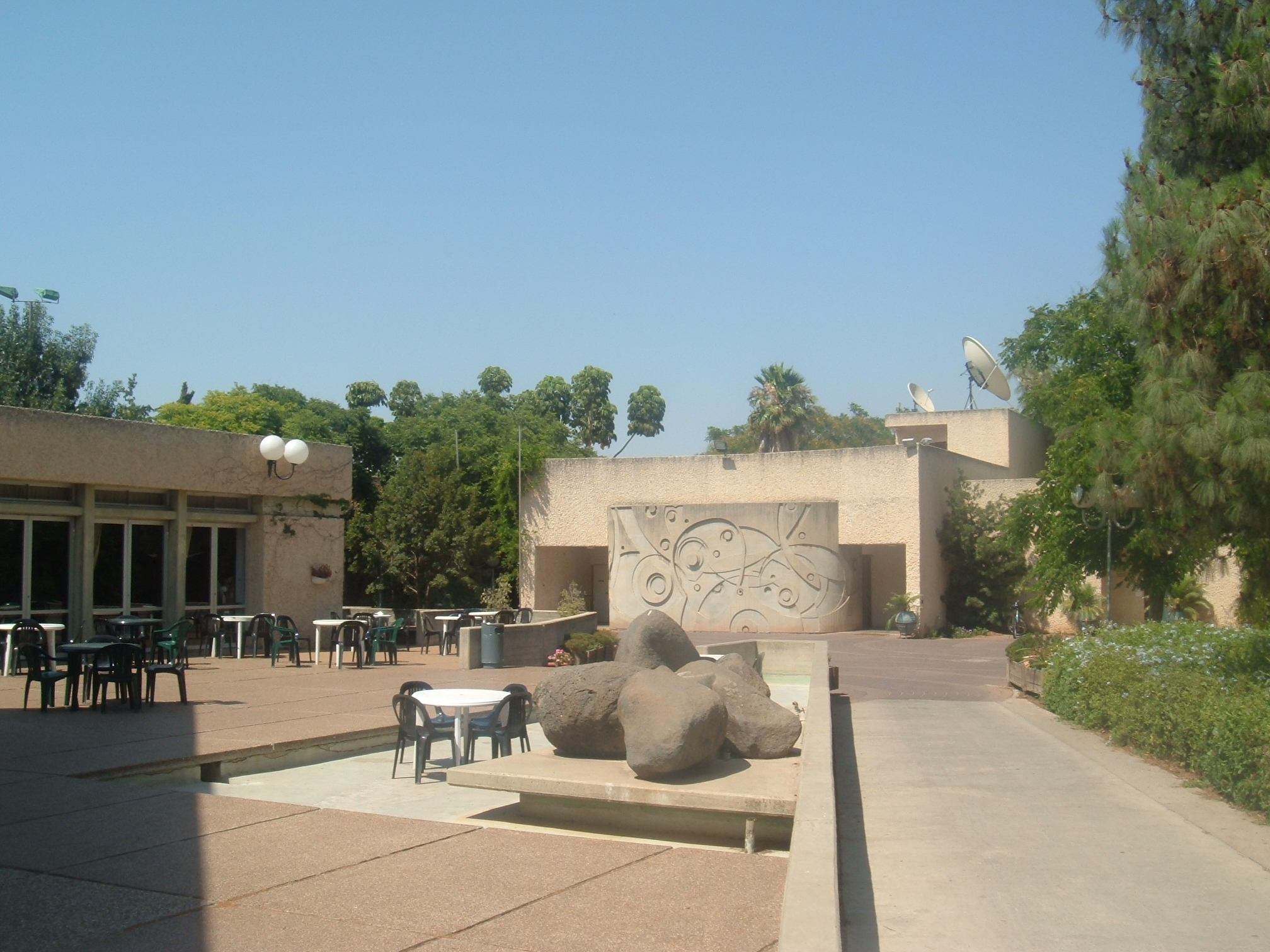

- Location within Jezreel Valley region of Israel
- Coordinates: 32°38′15″N 35°26′50″E
- Country: Israel
- District: Northern
- Subdistrict: Jezreel
- Council: Jezreel Valley
- Affiliation: Kibbutz Movement
- Founded: 1948
- Founder: Argentine, Polish, Romanian and Turkish Jews
- Population (2024): 841

Gazit (Hebrew: גָּזִית, lit. dressed stone) is a kibbutz in northern Israel. Located in the Galilee, it falls under the jurisdiction of Jezreel Valley Regional Council. In 2024 it had a population of 841.

== Etymology ==
The name is symbolic, derived from the Book of Isaiah 9:10: "The bricks have fallen down, but we will rebuild with dressed stone". The kibbutz was originally called "Argentina A".

== History ==
The kibbutz community was formed in 1947 by immigrants from Argentina, Poland, Romania and Turkey. The physical kibbutz was established in 1948 on land near the former Palestinian village of al-Tira, which was depopulated during the 1948 Arab–Israeli War, 1.5 km southwest of the village site.

Gazit became a permanent settlement in 1950. Initially a communist kibbutz, its members decided to swear allegiance to the state in 1952, expelling 22 Maki members in the process.

== Economy ==
The main Traditional livelihood branches of the kibbutz are field crops, orchard (near Nahal Tavor ), almond and olive groves, barn, house sheep, beef, and chicken coop. The Kibbutz also runs a community pub. Apart from these fields, The Kibbutz's main income is largely based on the Factory " Plazit " that produces rigid plastic sheets, plastic products primarily for the food trays for the food industry (with grouping ascending ). In recent years, the factory has incorporated a number of other factories, and even bought factories in Bulgaria and Chile. In 1952 "Naaman Gazit ", a factory producing porcelain plates, was established at the kibbutz, but closed several years later.
