= Tigran (name) =

Tigran (Armenian: Տիգրան; in Western Armenian pronounced Dikran) is an Armenian given name. The historical name is Tigranes, primarily kings of Armenia.

Tigran and Dikran may refer to:

== Given name ==
- Tigran Arakelyan (born 1987), Armenian-American music conductor
- Tigran Arzakantsyan (born 1966), Armenian businessman, politician and parliamentarian
- Tigran Avanesyan (born 2002), Armenian footballer
- Tigran Avinyan (born 1989), Armenian politician and Mayor of Yerevan
- Tigran Balayan (born 1977), Armenian diplomat and historian
- Tigran Barseghyan (born 1993), Armenian footballer
- Tigran Begoyan (born 1948), Armenian middle weight boxing champion between 1968 and 1978
- Tigran Chukhajian (1837–1898), Armenian composer, conductor, public activist and the founder of the first opera institution in the Ottoman Empire
- Tigran Davtyan (born 1978), Armenian footballer
- Tigran Eganyan (1978–2024), Armenian politician
- Tigran Gharabaghtsyan (born 1984), Armenian football (soccer) player
- Tigran Gharamian (born 1984), Armenian chess player and grandmaster
- Tigran Gspeyan (born 1969), Armenian footballer
- Tigran Gyokchyan (born 1965), Lebanese-Armenian basketball coach
- Tigran Hamasyan (born 1987), Armenian jazz pianist
- Tigran Harutyunyan (born 1997), Armenian chess grandmaster
- Tigran Hekekyan (born 1959), Armenian professor of music and conductor
- Tigran Hovhannisyan (born 1974), Armenian footballer
- Tigran Karapetyan (1945–2021), Armenian politician
- Tigrane Kazazian (born 1987), French-Armenian musician
- Tigran Keosayan (1966–2025), Russian-Armenian film director, actor and writer
- Tigran Khudaverdyan (born 1981), Russian computer scientist and businessman
- Tigran Khzmalyan (also Xmalian, born 1963), independent Armenian filmmaker, screenwriter and producer
- Tigran Kotanjian (born 1981), Armenian chess grandmaster
- Tigran Levonyan (1936–2004), Armenian opera tenor and director
- Tigran Mansurian (born 1939), Armenian composer of classical music and film scores
- Tigran Martirosyan (born 1983), Armenian tennis player
- Tigran Gevorg Martirosyan (born 1988), Armenian weightlifter
- Tigran Vardan Martirosyan (born 1983), Armenian weightlifter who competes in the 85 kg category
- Tigran Maytesian (born 1970), Armenian classical violinist
- Tigran Mkrtchyan (born 1978), Armenian diplomat, historian and political scientist
- Tigran Nagdalian (1966–2002), Armenian journalist
- Tigran Nalbandian (1975–2025), Armenian chess grandmaster
- Tigran Ouzlian (born 1968), Greek-Armenian amateur boxer
- Tigran Petrosian (1929–1984), Soviet Armenian grandmaster and World Chess Champion
- Tigran L. Petrosian (born 1984), Armenian chess player and grandmaster
- Tigran Petrosyants (born 1973), Armenian football (soccer) player
- Tigran Sargsyan (born 1960), Prime Minister of Armenia
- Tigran Torosyan (born 1956), Armenian politician, speaker of the National Assembly of Armenia from 2006 to 2008
- Tigran Tsitoghdzyan (born 1976), Armenian-American painter
- Tigran Ulikhanyan (born 1983), Armenian politician and parliamentarian
- Tigran Vardanjan (born 1989), Russian-Armenian figure skater who competes internationally for Hungary
- Tigran Yesayan (born 1972), Armenian football (soccer) player and coach

=== Dikran ===
- Dikran Chökürian (1884–1915), Armenian writer and teacher, newspaper editor, a victim of Armenian Genocide
- Dikran Kelekian (1868–1951), collector and dealer of Islamic art
- Dikran Kouyoumdjian (1895–1956), pen name Michael Arlen, American Armenian writer, novelist
- Dikran Tahta (1928–2006), British-Armenian mathematician, teacher and author
- Dikran Tulaine (born 1956), English actor, playwright and storyteller of Armenian descent

== Family name ==
- Aram Tigran or Aramê Dîkran, born Aram Melikyan (1934–2009), contemporary Armenian singer who sang primarily in Kurdish, but also Armenian and Neo-Aramaic

== See also ==
- Tigranakert of Artsakh, archaeological site in Azerbaijan
- Tigranakert (Nakhchivan), ancient Armenian city
- Tigranocerta, ancient Armenian city
- Tigran Melikov's House, mansion in Baku
- Tigranes, multiple historical Armenian figures
