= Alexey Vaulin =

Russian painter

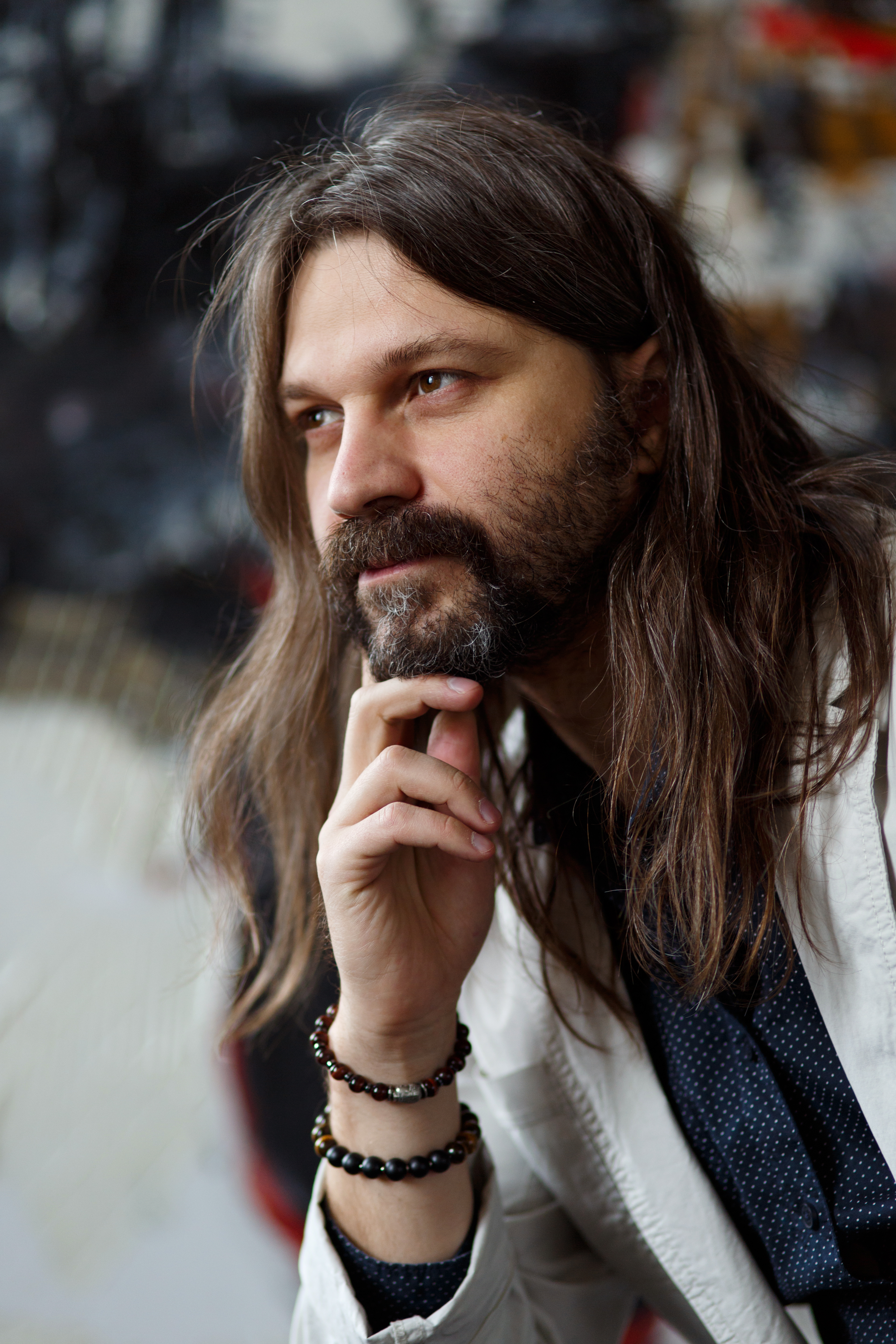
- Born: 15 January 1974 (age 52); Moscow, USSR
- Education: Moscow 1905 Memorial Arts School; Russian State Specialized Academy of Arts
- Known for: Painting, drawing
- Movement: Abstractionism

Alexey Vaulin (born 15 January 1974, Moscow, USSR) is a Russian painter and graphic artist. He is a member of the Moscow Union of Artists and of the Union of Artists of Russia.

== Biography ==
=== Studies ===
Vaulin was born in Moscow. He began drawing before he started school. He attended a children's art studio, and later the Timiryazev Children's Art School.
In 1994 he graduated from the Moscow 1905 Memorial Arts School. In 2000 he graduated from the easel painting department of the Russian State Specialized Academy of Arts.
His teachers were Oleg Nikolaevich Loshakov, Aleksandr Vladimirovich Ishin, and Ivan Alekseevich Polienko.
After university, he spent two years a non-matriculating student at the department of art history in Moscow State University. At the same time he taught painting in an art school.

=== Work ===
His first solo exhibition was held in 2000 in the Moscow Central House of Artists. Then followed a series of solo exhibitions in the Moscow branch of the Union of Artists, in the "Kino" gallery, in ZAO "Citibank", "Veresov Gallery", and other Moscow galleries.

In 2003 he took part in two exhibitions in the Tretyakov Gallery – "Moscow abstract. Second half of the 20th Century" and "Abstract in fashion", after which the Tretyakov Gallery acquired his work "Black Diamond".

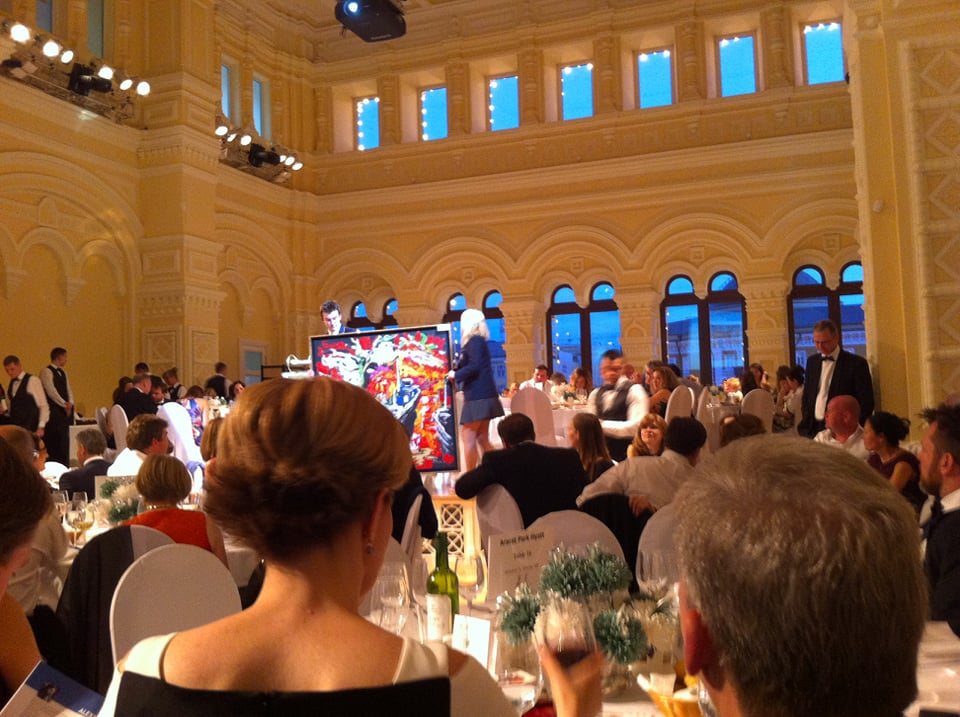
Painting by Alexey Vaulin "Blue boat, lit by the sun", in the Christie's charity auction "Dreams 2015", Moscow.

In 2013 a joint exhibition between Vaulin and the Japanese artist Naomi Maki, "The unseen world: A view from Moscow and Tokyo", was held in "Veresov Gallery".
In 2014 he had a joint exhibition with the Chinese artist Lian Hua "Presentation to the Dragon".
In 2015 Alexey Vaulin's work ‘Blue boat, lit by the sun’ was included the charity auction "Dreams 2015", which was organised by the auction house Christie's.

In 2016 at the invitation of the Panama Museum of Modern Art (MoMa), a solo exhibition was held in Panama City (Central America).

In 2000 he became a member of the Moscow Union of Artists. Since 2001 he has been a member of the Union of Artists of Russia.

He is a winner of the International Non-Governmental Prize "Peacemaker in the Field of Art".

Works by Alexey Vaulin are found in the collections of the Moscow Museum of Modern Art, in the State Tretyakov Gallery, in The Gorbachev Foundation (Moscow), in the Museum of Modern Fine Arts on Dmitrovskaya, in the Garden Ring Museum, in the Panama Museum of Modern Art (MoMa), in Luciano Benetton collection (Fondazione Imago Mundi, Italy), in Konstantin Elyutin's collection, and in private collections in Russia, Netherlands, Spain and the US.

== Selected works ==
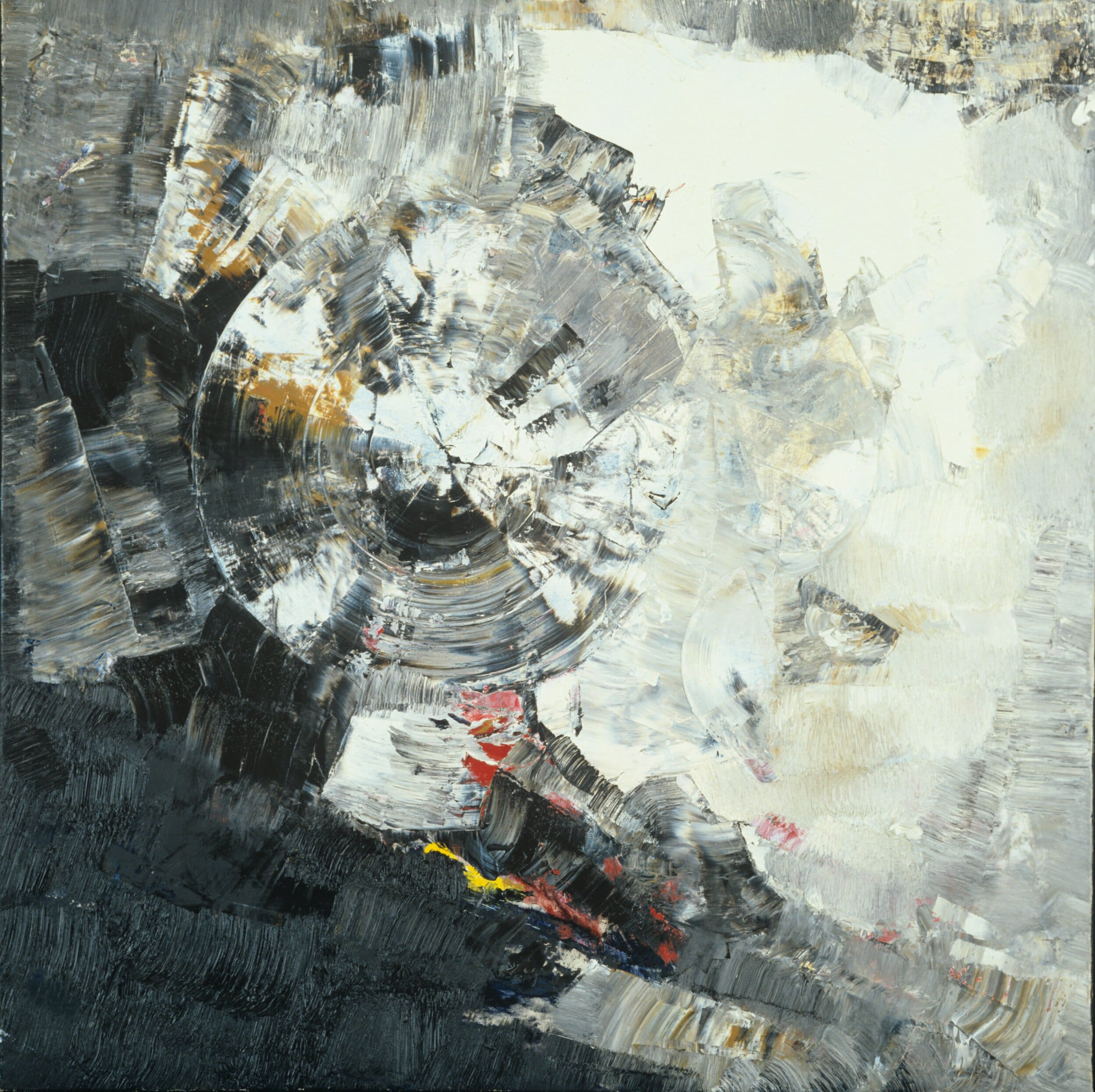
"Wheel of fate", 2000 – 2002. Oil on canvas, 130 х 130 cm.

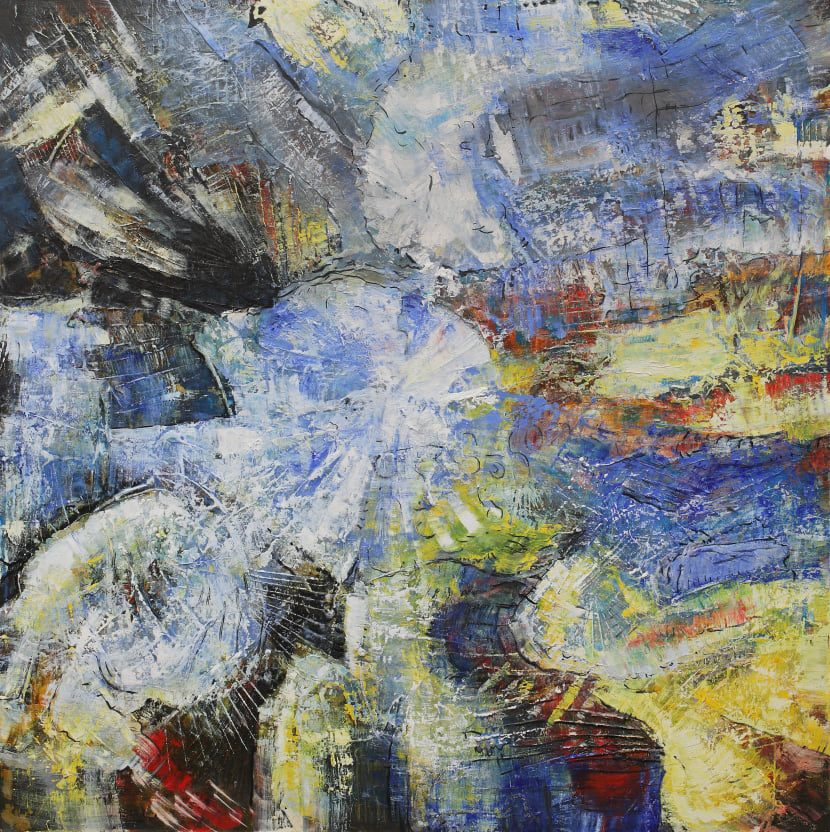
"Winter’s day", 2014. Oil on canvas, 120 х 130 cm.

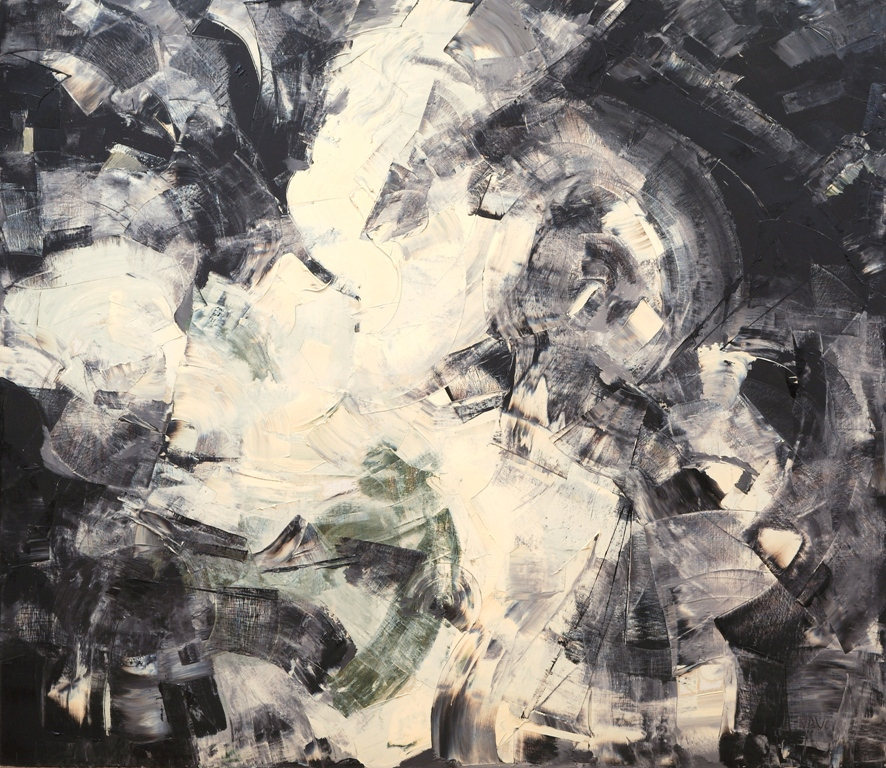
"Wizard of the North", 2002. Oil on canvas, 170 х 200 cm.

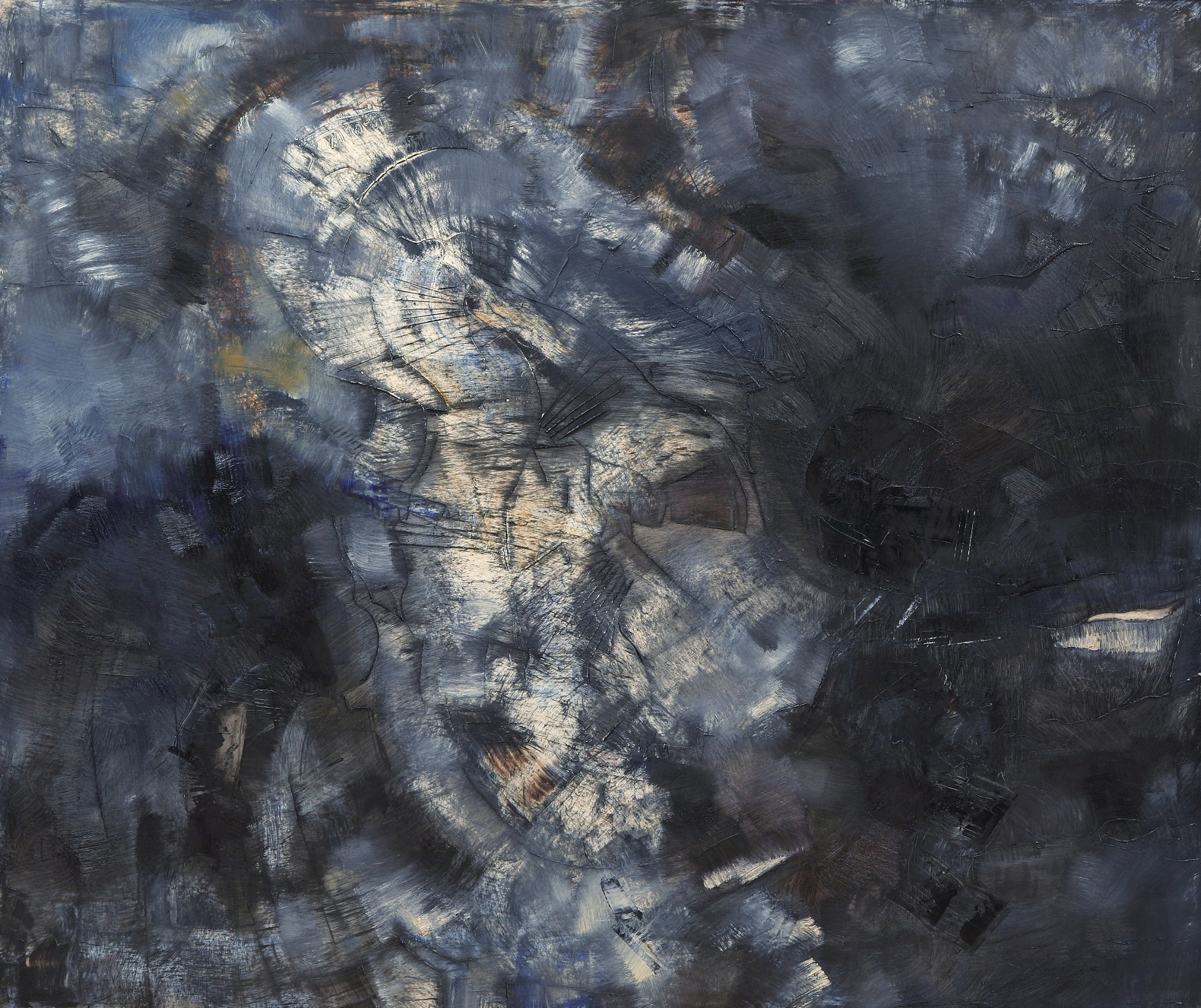
"Cosmic prism", 2003. Oil on canvas, 190 х 160 cm.

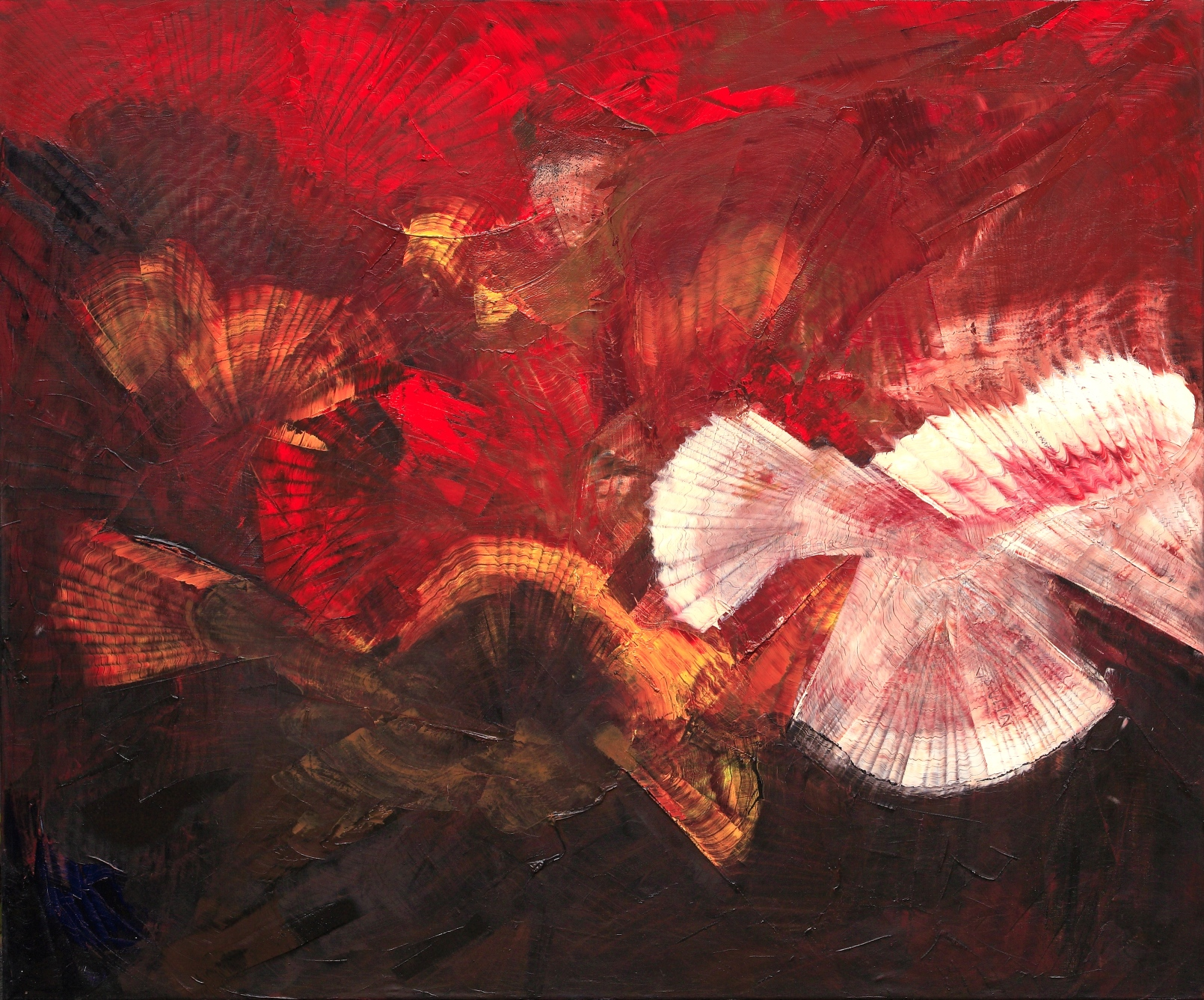
"Jonathan Livingston Seagull", 2006. Oil on canvas, 80 х 100 cm.

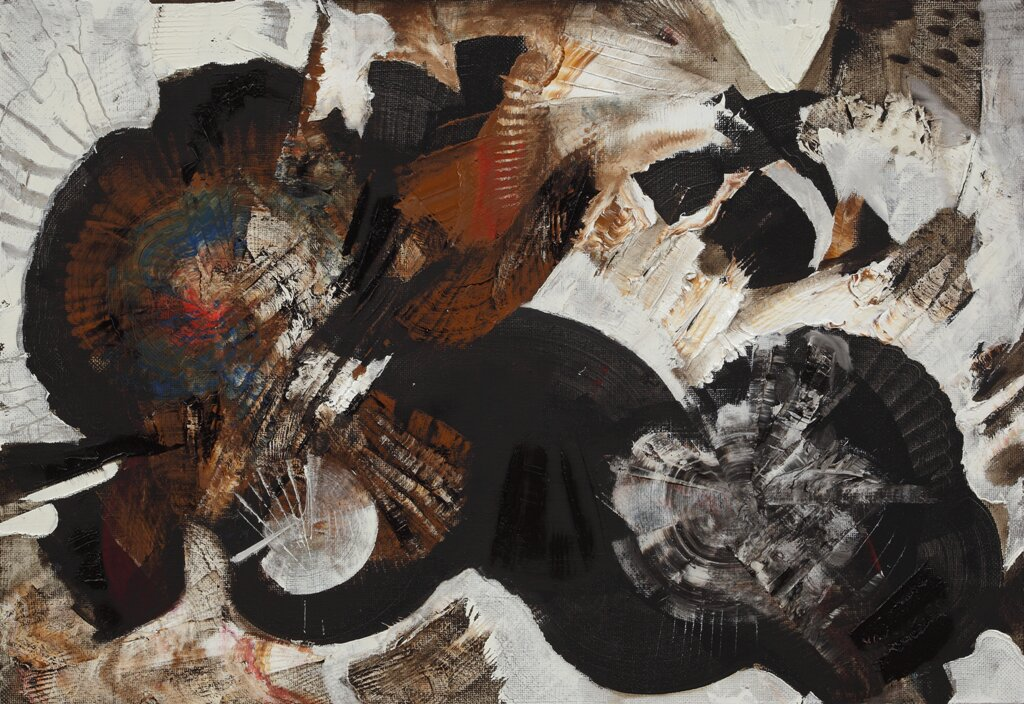
"Composition number 308", 2011. Oil on canvas, 100 х 70 cm.

== Sources ==
- Person of the week: Alexey Vaulin
- Article by Elena Komarenko "Alexey Vaulin’s space odyssey"
- Article by Ilona Lebedeva "Life in Colour"
- Alexey Vaulin on the Museum of Modern Fine Arts on DMITROVSKAYA site
- Photo report from the opening of the exhibition "The pilgrim’s path" on the Museum of Modern Fine Arts on DMITROVSKAYA site
- Article by Ilona Lebedeva on Alexey Vaulin’s exhibition "Ten Day Event. 10 years in 10 days" on the "Kino" gallery site
