= Barzanun Rural District =

Rural district in Razavi Khorasan province, Iran

Barzanun Rural District Persian: دهستان برزنون
- Rural District
- Location within Iran
- Coordinates: 36°37′N 58°19′E
- Country: Iran
- Province: Razavi Khorasan
- County: Nishapur
- District: Sarvelayat
- Established: 2003
- Capital: Barzanun

Population (2016)
  - Total: 4,764
- Time zone: UTC+3:30 (IRST)

Barzanun Rural District (Persian: دهستان برزنون) is in Sarvelayat District of Nishapur County, Razavi Khorasan province, Iran. Its capital is the village of Barzanun.

== Demographics ==
=== Population ===
At the time of the 2006 National Census, the rural district's population was 6,032 in 1,437 households. There were 5,693 inhabitants in 1,674 households at the following census of 2011. The 2016 census measured the population of the rural district as 4,764 in 1,488 households. The most populous of its 18 villages was Barzanun, with 2,985 people.

=== Other villages in the rural district ===
- Emamzadeh-ye Hoseyn Asghar
- Gavkosh
- Kalateh-ye Hajji
- Kheyrabad
- Qareh Gol
- Shotor Sang
- Tiran
- Zohan
