= Sheykh Mostafa, Kermanshah =

Sheykh Mostafa شيخ مصطفي
- Village
- Location within Iran
- Coordinates: 34°28′55″N 46°33′35″E
- Country: Iran
- Province: Kermanshah
- County: Kermanshah
- Bakhsh: Kuzaran
- Rural District: Sanjabi

Population (2006)
  - Total: 111
- Time zone: UTC+3:30 (IRST)
  - Summer (DST): UTC+4:30 (IRDT)

Sheykh Mostafa (Persian: شيخ مصطفي, also Romanized as Sheykh Moşţafá; also known as Shaikh Mustafa) is a village in Sanjabi Rural District, Kuzaran District, Kermanshah County, Kermanshah Province, Iran. At the 2006 census, its population was 111, in 28 families.
