= Russian State Specialized Academy of Arts =

Russian State Specialized Academy of Arts (RSSAA)
- Росси́йская госуда́рственная специализи́рованная акаде́мия иску́сств
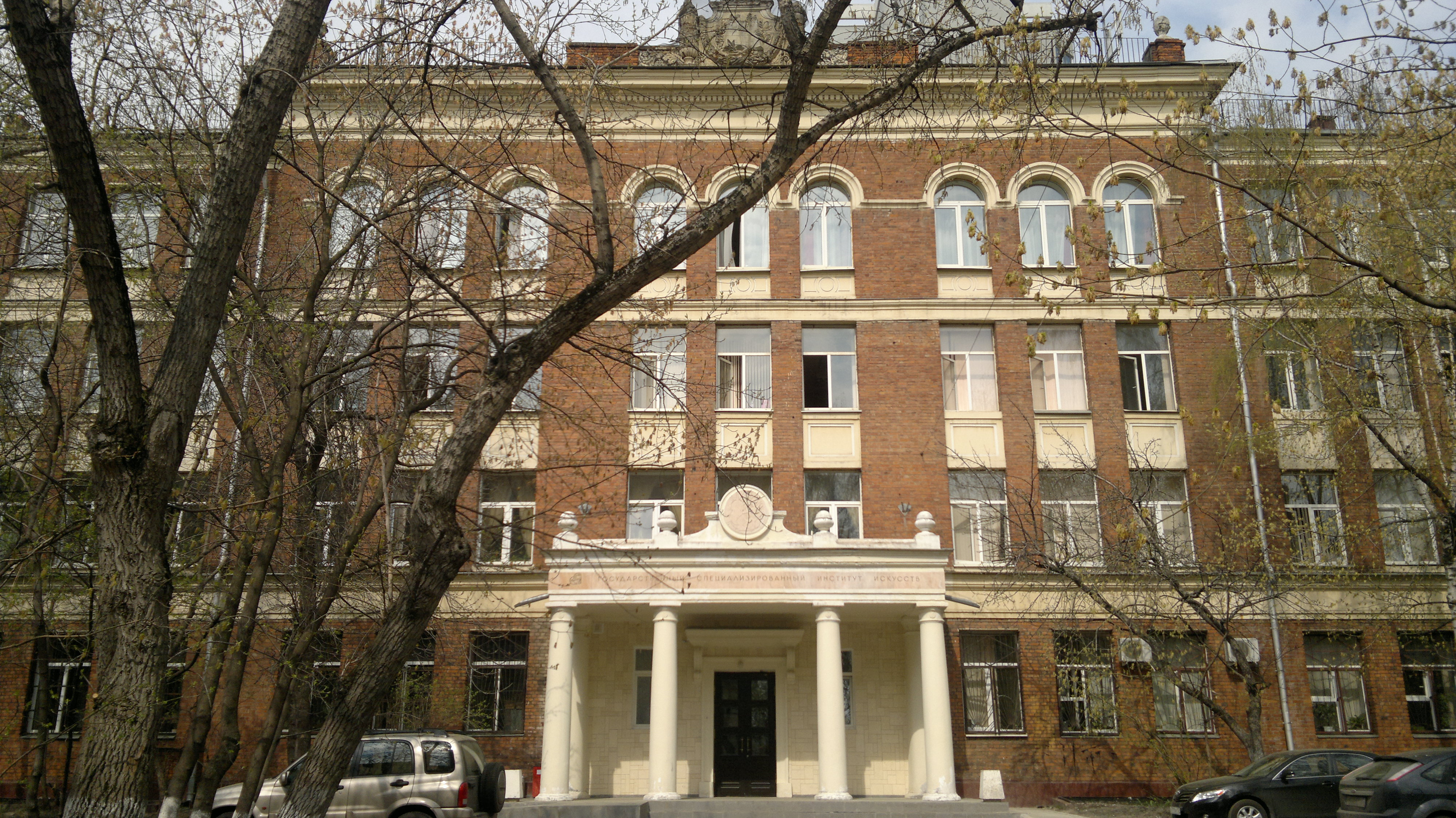
- Type: Public
- Established: 16 November 1991
- Rector: Alexander Yakupov
- Academic staff: 130
- Students: 316
- Undergraduates: 10
- Location: Moscow, Russia; 55.7404°N 37.5496°E
- Campus: Urban
- Language: Russian
- Website: rgsai.ru
Russian State Specialized Academy of Arts
- Location within Moscow
General information
- Location: Moscow, Russia
Height
- Architectural: 240 m (787 ft)

Russian State Specialized Academy of Arts (RSSAA; Russian: Российская государственная специализированная академия искусств, often abbreviated РГСАИ) is a coeducational and public research university located in Moscow, Russia. — higher education institution preparing theatre actors, artists and musicians. Specializes in teaching students with disabilities.

== History ==
Russian State Specialized Academy of Arts is former State Specialized Institute of Arts (SSIA) which was established in 1991. The Institute was granted the Academy status in 2014. The Academy is the only higher educational establishment in the world that provides people with limited physical abilities to have higher education in the arts: music, theatre and painting. The idea of inclusive education is being implemented at the Academy for more than 20 years. Modern education methods and student composition promote this educational form.

== Campus ==
The four-storey building of the Academy was built in the early 1950s according to the standard project of L. A. Stepanova. Initially, it housed School 96 of Kievsky district of Moscow.

== Faculties and departments ==
List of faculties and departments of the Russian State Specialized Academy of Arts (RSSAA)

=== Faculty of fine arts ===
The faculty trains academic easel painters and graphic artists, as well as environmental designers.

Department of painting and graphics

- Easel painting workshop
- Workshop of easel graphics
- Workshop linocut and etching
- Academic sculpture workshop

Department of environmental design

- Ceramics workshop
- Computer Design Workshop

=== Musical faculty ===
The faculty trains vocalists, performers and sound engineers.

Department of instrumental performance

- special piano
- flute
- accompaniment class, chamber ensemble
- clarinet
- pipe
- trombone

Department of Opera training

Department of Opera singing

Department of folk instruments

- accordion
- balalaika

Department of Theory and History of Music

Department of musical sound engineering, acoustics and computer science

Opera theatre

=== Theater faculty ===
The faculty trains actors of drama, Comedy and mimic theatre, as well as masters of artistic expression.

Department of acting

Department of plastic expressiveness

The Department of scenic speech and the surdopedagogy chair

Laboratory of sign language and sign language

== Teaching staff ==
The teaching staff consists of about 100 people

=== Professors ===
- Alexander Yakupov, Doctor of arts, Honored art worker of the Russian Federation, Rector;

== Opera theatre ==
The Grand opening of the Opera house of RSSAA was presented by a gala concert of students and graduates of Faculty of Music on December 18, 2012 . Musical Director of the theater and Conductor is Alexander Yakupov, Honored Artist of the Russian Federation, Professor, Rector of RSSAA .

- The premiere of Alexander Dargomyzhsky's Opera "Stone guest" took place on December 19, 2012
- The premiere of Pyotr Ilyich Tchaikovsky's Opera "Iolanta" took place on December 26, 2013.

== Transport connections ==
- Metro: Studencheskaya station

== See also ==
- Education in Russia
- List of early modern universities in Europe
- List of universities in Russia
