= Tiran, Razavi Khorasan =

Village in Razavi Khorasan province, Iran

Tiran Persian: تيران
- Village
- Location within Iran
- Coordinates: 36°35′51″N 58°16′19″E
- Country: Iran
- Province: Razavi Khorasan
- County: Nishapur
- District: Sarvelayat
- Rural District: Barzanun

Population (2016)
  - Total: 418
- Time zone: UTC+3:30 (IRST)

Tiran (Persian: تيران) (Note: Also romanized as Tīrān) is a village in Barzanun Rural District of Sarvelayat District in Nishapur County, Razavi Khorasan province, Iran.

== Demographics ==
=== Population ===
At the time of the 2006 National Census, the village's population was 493 in 118 households. The following census in 2011 counted 403 people in 127 households. The 2016 census measured the population of the village as 418 people in 141 households.
