= Hince =

Hince is a surname. Notable people with the surname include:

- Frank Hince (1882–1945), Australian rules footballer
- Jamie Hince (born 1968), English guitarist, singer, and songwriter
- Julienne Hince, Australian High Commissioner to Malta, appointed in 2016
- Paul Hince (1945–2023), English footballer
