= INS Tir =

The following ships of the Indian Navy have been named Tir:

- HMIS Tir (K256) was a River-class frigate of the Royal Indian Navy, transferred from the Royal Navy where she served in World War II as HMS Bann (K256)
- INS Tir (A86) is a training ship of the Indian Navy
