= Alexander Yakupov =

Russian conductor, art expert and cultural figure (born 1951)

Alexander Nikolaevich Yakupov Александр Николаевич Якупов HARF
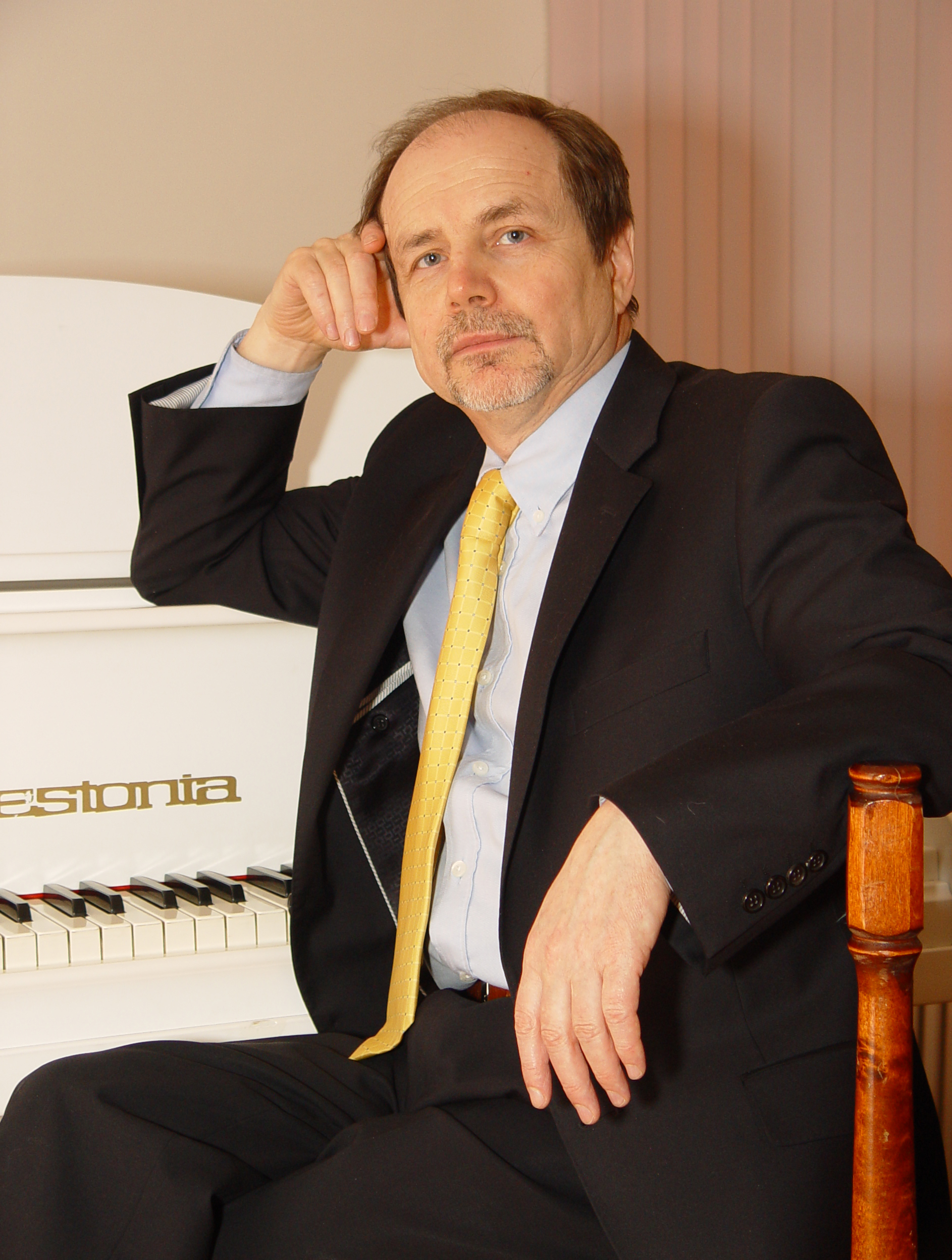
- During a concert in Great Hall of Moscow Conservatory, 2006

Background information
- Born: May 13, 1951 (age 75); Svetlogorsk, Russia, USSR
- Genre: Classical
- Occupation: conductor
- Instruments: piano, button accordion, trumpet, guitar, accordion

Alexander Yakupov (Russian: Александр Николаевич Якупов) was born on May 13, 1951, in Svetlogorsk, in the Chelyabinsk Oblast of Russia. Yakupov is a Russian opera and symphony conductor, and has been working as the rector of a Russian State Specialized Arts Academy since 2011.

Merited Worker of Arts of Russian Federation (1993). Doctor of Musical Arts (1995).

== Biography ==
Born on May 13, 1951, in Svetlogorsk township in Agapovo district of Chelyabinsk region of the Soviet Union. Studied in Magnitogorsk Glinka High Music School (1967–1970) and then in Ufa State Institute of Arts (music performance department) (1970–1975)/ From 1974 to 1982 he worked as educator at Magnitogorsk Glinka High Music School. In 1982 he became head of Magnitogorsk Glinka High Music School and held this position until 1997. From 1996 to 2000, he was the Artistic Director and Principal Conductor at Magnitogorsk Opera and Ballet Theatre (part-time job). In 1997, became Rector of Magnitogorsk State Conservatory and held this position till 2000. The year 2000 saw him changed residence for the city Moscow. From 2000 to 2002, was first vice-director of Russian State Circus Company. From 2002 to 2009, was art director of Opera Theater at Moscow State P.I. Tchaikovsky Conservatory (part-time job). In the period from 2002 to 2011, was head of Central Music School at Moscow State Tchaikovsky Conservatory. From 2010 to 2012, passed professional retraining at Gnesins` Russian State Music Academy, specialized in opera and symphony conducting (class of professor USSR People's Artist Fedoseyev V.I.). Since 2011, A.N. Yakupov is rector of the Russian State Specialized Academy of Arts, arts director and conductor of inclusive Opera Theatre at the Academy.

== Creative activities ==
=== Conductor's works ===
Conductor in performances by Magnitogorsk Opera and Ballet Theatre. Conductor in performances of Opera Theatre of Moscow State Conservatory. On the stage of the Opera Theatre of the Russian State Specialized Arts` Academy acted as conductor in performances.

=== Creative Projects ===
- Participation in work of juries of international competitions

== Managerial activities (management) ==
=== In Magnitogorsk ===
established Magnitogorsk State Conservatory

established Magnitogorsk Opera & Ballet Theater

=== In Central music school (college) at Moscow State P. I. Tchaikovsky Conservatory (CMS) ===
transformed Central music school into College

=== In Russian State Specialized Academy of Arts (RSSAA) ===
provided Academy students with two buildings of dormitory accommodation

== Awards and titles ==
Visit of RF President V.V. Putin to Academy (December 2017)

=== State awards ===
- Order of Honour (2007)
- Order of Friendship (2017)

=== Titles of honor and scientific degrees, membership in creative unions ===
- Academician of Russian Academy of Arts (2017)
- Corresponding Member of Russian Academy of Education (2016)
- Honorary citizen of Magnitogorsk (1997)
- Honorary professor of Magnitogorsk State Conservatory (2006), Honorary professor of Heiluntzyan Professional Institute of Arts (Harbin, China) (2006), Honorary professor of Czhench-chou University (China) (2015), Honorary professor of Saratov L.V. Sobinov Conservatory (2007)

== Scientific-publicistic activities ==
Monographs and main scientific publications.

=== Monographs ===
- "Musical bringing-up – to everyone! On experience of organization of mass musical bringing-up in Magnitogorsk" Moscow, Soviet composer 1990.
- "Musical communication: issues of theory and practice of management" Moscow State P.I. Tchaikovsky Conservatory, – Moscow, Publishing House of P.I. Tchaikovsky
- "Theoretical problems of musical communication" Moscow State P.I. Tchaikovsky conservatory; Moscow, Publishing House of P.I. Tchaikovsky MSC; Magnitogorsk: Publishing House of Magnitogorsk State Musical-Pedagogic Institute, 1994
- "Sorrows and joyances of top-manager in area of arts (from practice to theory of management)" – Moscow, Publishing House "Composer", Printing run: 500 copies, ISBN 5-85285-276-7
- "The Theory of Musical Communication" London: Cambridge Scholars Publishing, 2016. (10) ISBN 1-4438-9736-1 – (13) ISBN 978-1-4438-9736-5
- Statistical analysis of providing disabled and physically challenged persons with cultural goods in Russian Federation (scientific monograph). Moscow, Publishing House "Scientific library", 2017 coauthored with Blagireva E.N., Volodin A.A.

=== Main publications ===
- The structure of musical communication «Advances in social science, education and humanities». – Volume 3. – China, 2014. ISBN 978-94-6252-013-4, ISSN 2352-5398. – Р. 248–264.
- Art rehabilitation of disabled people in Russian Federation «Advances in social science, education and humanities». Volume 3. – China, 2014. ISBN 978-94-6252-013-4, ISSN 2352-5398. – Р. 10–21.
- Musical communication as an integral process «Advances in social science, education and humanities». – Volume 3. – China, 2014. ISBN 978-94-6252-013-4, ISSN 2352-5398. – Р. 240–248.
- The Communicative Means of Music and the Ways of Its Reproduction: The Historical and Analytical Aspect (научная статья) Журнал «Advances in Social Science Education and Humanities Research», vol. 23. International Conference on Arts, Design and Contemporary Education (ICADCE), Apr 22–24, 2015 / ed.: P. Perry [et al.]. – Moscow, Russia, 2015. – P. 1-11.
- Social and Musical Communication Past and Present (научная статья) Журнал "Advances in Social Science Education and Humanities Research", vol. 23. International Conference on Arts, Design and Contemporary Education (ICADCE), Apr 22–24, 2015 / ed.: P. Perry [et al.]. – Moscow, Russia, 2015. – P. 12-23.
- Musical Communication as an Integral Process (научная статья) "Advances in Social Science Education and Humanities Research", vol. 23. International Conference on Arts, Design and Contemporary Education (ICADCE), Apr 22–24, 2015 / ed.: P. Perry [et al.]. – Moscow, Russia, 2015. – P. 240-247.
- The Structure of Musical Communication (научная статья) "Advances in Social Science Education and Humanities Research", vol. 23. International Conference on Arts, Design and Contemporary Education (ICADCE), Apr 22–24, 2015 / ed.: P. Perry [et al.]. – Moscow, Russia, 2015. – P. 248-263.
- On Theoretical Principles of Managing the Processes of Musical Communication in Society "Advances in Social Science Education and Humanities Research", vol. 23. International Conference on Arts, Design and Contemporary Education (ICADCE 2016) – P.: Atlantis Press, 2016. – P. 1-8.
- The Matching of the Scholar Projecting and Perspective Planning in Russian Musical Communication "Advances in Social Science Education and Humanities Research", vol. 23. International Conference on Arts, Design and Contemporary Education (ICADCE 2016) – P.: Atlantis Press, 2016. – P. 55-60.
- On Some of the Ways and Methods of Realising the Principles of the Musical Communication. Upon the Problem of 'Marketing and the Listener' "Advances in Social Science Education and Humanities Research", vol. 23. International Conference on Arts, Design and Contemporary Education (ICADCE 2016) – P.: Atlantis Press, 2016. – P. 350-358.
- Phenomenon a Conservatory in a Country Town Журнал "Advances in Social Science Education and Humanities Research", vol. 144. 3rd International Conference on Arts, Design and Contemporary Education (ICADCE 2017) – P.: Atlantis Press, 2017. – P. 525-532.
- Some Secrets of Encouragement of Colleagues' Personal Advancement on Establishment of Postgraduate Studentship and Dissertations Board in Young Musical Institute "Advances in Social Science Education and Humanities Research", vol. 144. 3rd International Conference on Arts, Design and Contemporary Education (ICADCE 2017) – P.: Atlantis Press, 2017. – P. 600-604.
- Manpower Is All-Important on Methods of Musical Institute Personnel's Formation "Advances in Social Science Education and Humanities Research", vol. 144. 3rd International Conference on Arts, Design and Contemporary Education (ICADCE 2017) – P.: Atlantis Press, 2017. – P. 618-620.
- How to Deserve People's Trust. On Nonfictional Story of Special Music School Establishment Proceedings of the 2nd International Conference on Judicial, Administrative and Humanitarian Problems of State Structures and Economic Subjects "Advances in Social Sciences, Education and Humanities Research, volume 159, 2017. ISSN 2352-5398. – Р. 37–41.
- How a Management Crisis Occurs Proceedings of the 2nd International Conference on Judicial, Administrative and Humanitarian Problems of State Structures and Economic Subjects "Advances in Social Sciences, Education and Humanities Research, volume 159, 2017. ISSN 2352-5398. – P. 275-280.
- About Advantages of Manager's Critical Thinking on Infrastructure of Town's Profexxional Musical Culture Proceedings of the 2nd International Conference on Judicial, Administrative and Humanitarian Problems of State Structures and Economic Subjects "Advances in Social Sciences, Education and Humanities Research, volume 159, 2017. ISSN 2352-5398]. – P. 295-300.
- Television in Industrial Town A Phenomenon of Provincial Culture To the Problem of Manager's Tactics Advances in Social Science, Education and Humanities Research (ASSEHR), volume 252, 2018. – P. 253-255.
- Underlying Management Formulas in the Sphere of Culture Advances in Social Science, Education and Humanities Research (ASSEHR), volume 252, 2018. – P. 256-261.
- What Is More Important: Ideas or Money By the Case of Magnitogorsk State Conservatory 4th International Conference on Economics, Management, Law and Education (EMLE 2018) [Advances in Economics, Business and Management Research, volume 71, ISBN 978-94-6252-639-6, ISSN 2352-5428]. – P. 184-185.
- The More Important One: Ideas or Money By the Case of Magnitogorsk State Conservatory 4th International Conference on Economics, Management, Law and Education (EMLE 2018) [Advances in Economics, Business and Management Research, volume 71, ISBN 978-94-6252-639-6, ISSN 2352-5428]. – P. 238-239.
- Dealing with Managerial Conflicts and Resolving Them By the Case of Magnitogorsk Music Houses and Music Community 4th International Conference on Economics, Management, Law and Education (EMLE 2018) [Advances in Economics, Business and Management Research, volume 71, ISBN 978-94-6252-639-6, ISSN 2352-5428]. – P. 243-246.
- Implementing Large Projects of Organizational Development in the Extreme Business Conditions By the Case of Magnitogorsk High Music School 4th International Conference on Economics, Management, Law and Education (EMLE 2018) [Advances in Economics, Business and Management Research, volume 71, ISBN 978-94-6252-639-6, ISSN 2352-5428]. – P. 871-873.
- Dealing with Managerial Conflicts and Resolving Them 4th International Conference on Economics, Management, Law and Education (EMLE 2018) [Advances in Economics, Business and Management Research, volume 71, ISBN 978-94-6252-639-6, ISSN 2352-5428]. – P. 243-246.
