= Diran (disambiguation) =

Diran is a mountain in Pakistan.

Diran may also refer to:

== Places ==
- Diran, Iran, a village in Zanjan Province, Iran

== Persons ==
Given name

- Diran of Armenia, an Armenian King (339-350)
- Diran Adebayo (born 1968), British novelist, cultural critic and broadcaster
- Diran Alexanian (1881–1954), French Armenian cello teacher and musician
- Diran Chrakian (1875-1921), Armenian poet, writer, painter and teacher who was a victim of the Armenian Genocide
- Diran Kelekian (1862-1915), Ottoman Armenian journalist, writer, editor and professor who was an Armenian Genocide victim
- Diran Manoukian (born 1919), French Armenian field hockey player

Family name

- Richard K. Diran (born 1949), American gemologist
