= Tireh =

Tireh (Persian: تيره) may refer to:

- Tireh, Markazi
- Tireh, Qom
