= Chekneh =

City in Razavi Khorasan province, Iran

Chekneh چکنه
- City
- Location within Iran
- Coordinates: 36°49′00″N 58°30′17″E
- Country: Iran
- Province: Razavi Khorasan
- County: Nishapur
- District: Sarvelayat
- Established as a city: 2002

Population (2016)
  - Total: 1,381
- Time zone: UTC+3:30 (IRST)

Chekneh (Persian: چكنه) (Note: Also known as Chakaneh Pā’īin (چکنه پایین), Chakaneh-ye Pā’īn, Chakaneh Soflā and Chakaneh-e Soflá) is a city in, and the capital of, Sarvelayat District of Nishapur County, Razavi Khorasan province, Iran. The village of Chekneh was converted to a city in 2002.

== Demographics ==
=== Population ===
At the time of the 2006 National Census, the city's population was 1,363 in 421 households. The following census in 2011 counted 1,834 people in 472 households. The 2016 census measured the population of the city as 1,381 people in 440 households.
