= Teerandaz =

Teerandaz (lit. 'Archer') may refer to:

- Teerandaz (film), a 1955 Indian romance film by H. S. Rawail
- Teerandaz (TV series), an Indian Hindi-language action thriller TV series

== See also ==
- Krishnabarna Teerandaz (lit. 'Krishnabarna the Archer'), a 1930 Indian silent film by B. S. Rajhans
- Tirandaj Shabor (lit. 'Archer Shabor'), a 2022 Indian Bengali-language film by Arindam Sil, part of the Goenda Shabor (lit. 'Detective Shabor') film series
