= Talebi (surname) =

Talebi (Persian: طالبی) is an Iranian surname. In Gilan province, people with this surname are supposedly descended from Juvansher, a 7th century Sasanian prince and son of Khosrow II. It can also be associated with Abu Talib ibn Abd al-Muttalib, the father of Ali. Notable people with the surname include:

- Abbas Talebi (born 1967), Iranian Olympic weightlifter
- Abolqasem Talebi (born 1961), Iranian film director and screenwriter
- Aboutaleb Talebi (1945–2008), Iranian wrestler
- Farshid Talebi (born 1981), Iranian association football player
- Jalal Talebi (born 1942), Iranian association football player
- Niloufar Talebi, British-American writer
- Peyman Talebi (born 1987), Iranian TV host and singer
- Yaser Talebi, Iranian film director who directed Iranian drama film The Descendants

== See also ==
- Hamid Aboutalebi, Iranian diplomat
