= Tiran, Kerman =

Tiran تيران
- Village
- Location within Iran
- Coordinates: 31°09′03″N 56°37′11″E
- Country: Iran
- Province: Kerman
- County: Ravar
- Bakhsh: Central
- Rural District: Ravar

Government
  - Mayor: Hassan Shafiee Alavijah

Population (2006)
  - Total: 122
- Time zone: UTC+3:30 (IRST)
  - Summer (DST): UTC+4:30 (IRDT)

Tiran (Persian: تيران, also Romanized as Tīrān; also known as Tihrun) is a village in Ravar Rural District, in the Central District of Ravar County, Kerman Province, Iran. At the 2006 census, its population was 122, in 41 families.

== Geography ==
The town has an elevation of 1841 m above sea level, and an Average annual temperature 17 Freezing days 20 years a year

== Naming ==
Tiran is located in Iran, the word Tiran two components can be seen: first, "Tir", which is the name of the star of Tir, which is sacred to ancient Iranians, and "N", which is the suffix of plurality and proportion, and represents a place attributed to the arrow.

== Weather ==
Tiran city has desert climate and half desert with hot and dry summers and cold winters. The city has an annual rainfall of 256 mm per year. In Tiran, the highest relative humidity is 78% in winter and 13% in summer. The number of freezing days was reported in 2011-2011. In terms of weather conditions equal to Tiran Colimatolozi station, the average temperature in January 4.5 and maximum temperature in July is 2.35 °C.

== Notable people ==
- Emamzadegan Shahr
- Imamzadeh Ahmad b. Muhammad al-Hanafiyya, a descendant of 'Ali b. Abi Talib, is located in Tiran.
- Imamzadeh 'Abdu'a b. Musa b. Ja'far is located in the village of Kohan.
- Imamzadeh Husayn b. Adnan b. Musa b. Ja'far in Rezvanshahr
- Emamzadeh Jawad bin Musa in ahmadreza village (known as Cheshmeh Ahmadreza)
- Imamzadeh Sayyid Sara al-Din Fadl (known as Baba Langar) is a descendant of Ali ibn Musa al-Reza in the south of Asgaran
- Emamzadeh Bibby Fatima, a descendant of Musa b. Ja'far in the village of Muhammadiyah Kron
- Imamzadeh Prince Hussein (known as Shazdeh Hussain) in kheirabad village

== Natural attractions ==
- Wildlife and National Park and Qamishlu Citadel:
- Qamishlu National Park and Wildlife Refuge is located 45 km northwest of Isfahan and adjacent to the city of Tiran. The area of Qamishlu National Park is 29,886 hectares and the area of Qamishlu Wildlife Refuge is 83,888 hectares. Qamishlu National Park is said to be the wor

ld's oldest protected area founded 150 years ago, Zahl al-Sultan, the eldest son of Nasir al-Din Shah and ruler of Isfahan wildlife there Include deer, rams, ewes, pazen, wolves.

- Morabi Spring: A high-water spring that originates from the Crown section and south of the village of Qala-e-Nazer and leads to the Pulan Dam
- Wildlife of The Overturned Valales of Dalankuh and its ski resort
- The Dalankuh ski resort, located on the northern slopes of Dalankuh and located in the Kroon region, welcomes winter sports enthusiasts in winter. The peak of Dalankuh with an altitude of 3,636 meters is located in this region, which annually more than 1,000 climbers from all over Iran to climb the area;
- The underground mill is related to the Qajar period and is located in The City of Tiran, Moallem Boulevard, next to Joy Shah and the southern side of Tohid Street, and this work was registered as one of the national monuments of Iran on January 5, 2009 with registration number 24029.
