= Tiran, Mazandaran =

Tiran تيران
- Village
- Location within Iran
- Coordinates: 36°05′13″N 52°23′29″E
- Country: Iran
- Province: Mazandaran
- County: Amol
- Bakhsh: Larijan
- Rural District: Larijan-e Sofla

Population (2016)
  - Total: 26
- Time zone: UTC+3:30 (IRST)

Tiran (Persian: تيران, also Romanized as Tīrān) is a village in Larijan-e Sofla Rural District, Larijan District, Amol County, Mazandaran Province, Iran. At the 2016 census, its population was 26, in 11 families. Down from 36 in 2006.
