= Sarvelayat Rural District =

Rural district in Razavi Khorasan province, Iran

Sarvelayat Rural District Persian: دهستان سرولايت
- Rural District
- Location within Iran
- Coordinates: 36°47′N 58°23′E
- Country: Iran
- Province: Razavi Khorasan
- County: Nishapur
- District: Sarvelayat
- Established: 1987
- Capital: Abdollah Givi

Population (2016)
  - Total: 8,519
- Time zone: UTC+3:30 (IRST)

Sarvelayat Rural District (Persian: دهستان سرولايت) is in Sarvelayat District of Nishapur County, Razavi Khorasan province, Iran. Its capital is the village of Abdollah Givi.

== Demographics ==
=== Population ===
At the time of the 2006 National Census, the rural district's population was 10,567 in 2,947 households. There were 9,918 inhabitants in 3,259 households at the following census of 2011. The 2016 census measured the population of the rural district as 8,519 in 3,004 households. The most populous of its 42 villages was Soltan Meydan, with 775 people.

=== Other villages in the rural district ===
- Fahneh
- Kelidar
- Khayesk
- Khvajehabad
- Kuh Sakht
- Saqi Beyg
- Talebi
