= Sarvelayat District =

District in Razavi Khorasan province, Iran

Sarvelayat District Persian: بخش سرولایت
- District
- Location within Iran
- Coordinates: 36°44′N 58°28′E
- Country: Iran
- Province: Razavi Khorasan
- County: Nishapur
- Capital: Chekneh

Population (2016)
  - Total: 14,664
- Time zone: UTC+3:30 (IRST)

Sarvelayat District (Persian: بخش سرولایت) is in Nishapur County, Razavi Khorasan province, Iran. Its capital is the city of Chekneh.

== Demographics ==
=== Population ===
At the time of the 2006 National Census, the district's population was 17,962 in 4,805 households. The following census in 2011 counted 17,445 people in 5,405 households. The 2016 census measured the population of the district as 14,664 inhabitants in 4,932 households.

=== Administrative divisions ===
Sarvelayat District Population
Administrative Divisions	2006	2011	2016
Barzanun RD	6,032	5,693	4,764
Sarvelayat RD	10,567	9,918	8,519
Chekneh (city)	1,363	1,834	1,381
Total	17,962	17,445	14,664
RD = Rural District
