= Tyra =

Tyra may refer to:

== Places ==
- Tyra (Třinec), a village and part of Třinec in the Czech Republic
- Tyra (stream), a stream in the Czech Republic
- Tyra Field, a gas field in the North Sea

== People ==
- Tyra (given name)
- Tyra (surname)

=== Television ===
- The Tyra Banks Show, a syndicated American television talk show hosted by Tyra Banks also known as Tyra

== See also ==
- Tayra
- Thyra (disambiguation)
- Tira (disambiguation)
- Tyr (disambiguation)
- Tyras (disambiguation)
- Tyro (disambiguation)
