= Oldřichovice =

Oldřichovice may refer to places in the Czech Republic:

- Oldřichovice (Zlín District), a municipality and village in the Zlín Region
- Oldřichovice, a village and part of Dešenice in the Plzeň Region
- Oldřichovice (Třinec), a village and part of Třinec in the Moravian-Silesian Region
- Oldřichovice, a village and part of Ústí nad Orlicí in the Pardubice Region
