= Thyra (disambiguation) =

Thyra was a 10th-century Danish queen.

Thyra may also refer to:

- Thyra (given name)
- Thyra (river), a river in Saxony-Anhalt, Germany
- 115 Thyra, a main-belt asteroid
- Thyra, New South Wales, Australia

== See also ==
- Tayra
- Tira (disambiguation)
- Tyra (disambiguation)
