= Allerpark =

Park in Wolfsburg, Germany

Coordinates: 52°26′8.3724″N 10°49′21.54″E

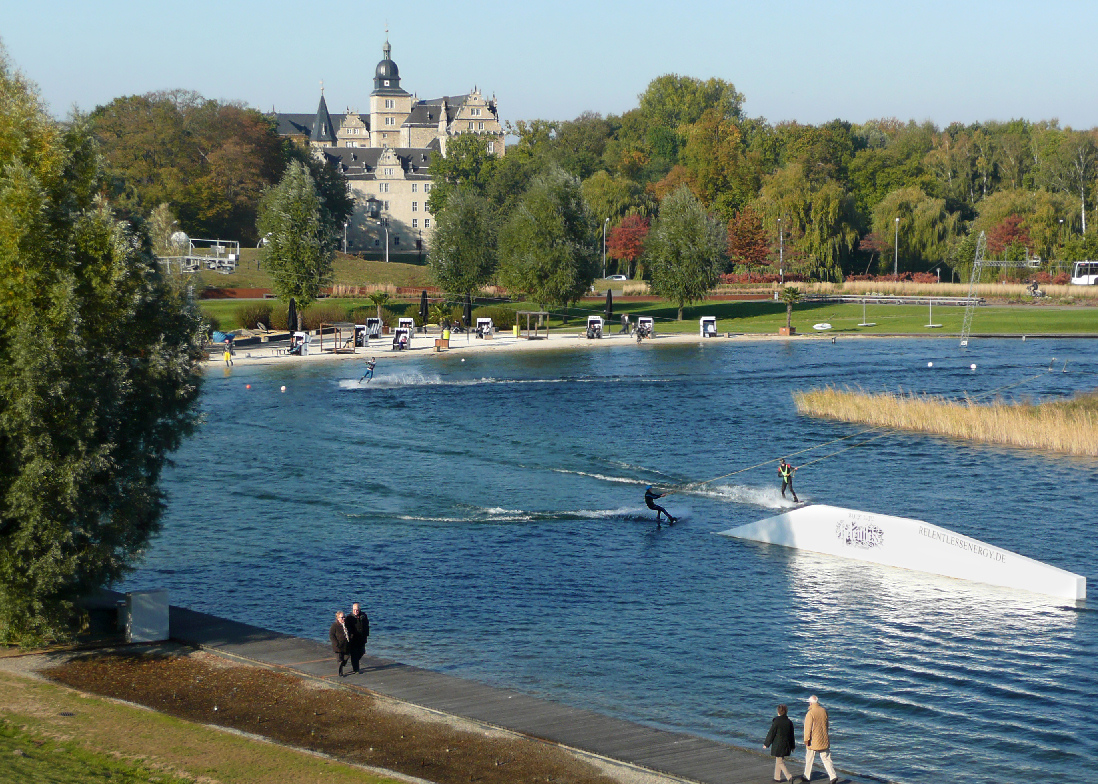
Wakeboarding at the Allersee

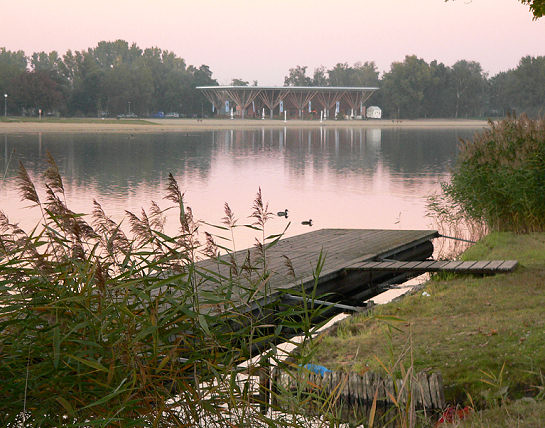
Expo 2000 Colombian Pavilion

The Allerpark is a public leisure park in the German city of Wolfsburg. It is located between the districts of Wolfsburg-Reislingen, Wolfsburg-Vorsfelde, Wolfsburg-Nordstadt and Wolfsburg-Stadtmitte. The Allersee lake, which was created at the end of the 1960s, forms the heart of the park. The Allerpark covers an area of 130 hectares and is home to a multitude of leisure facilities and attractions such as the AOK Stadium, the BadeLand Wolfsburg swimming pool and water park complex, the Eis Arena Wolfsburg ice rink and the Volkswagen Arena, as well as a number of other facilities that can be used for free, for example beach volleyball courts, a skatepark and several playgrounds. The company Wolfsburg AG is responsible for the marketing of the Allerpark.

== History ==
Work on the Allerpark began in 1969 after the respective decisions were taken by Wolfsburg City Council. The river Aller was diverted in order to create the Allersee lake. The aim of the project was for the Allerpark to not only fulfil a cultural purpose, but also play a symbolic role for the city and the surrounding region. A multitude of clubs and associations have been based by the Aller or Allersee since the 1950s and 1960s, for example Wolfsburg's canoeing, rowing and yacht clubs. In 1975, the city initially had to postpone further work on the Allerpark due to reductions in revenue from taxes paid by Volkswagen. Nevertheless, it was able to open the BadeLand Wolfsburg indoor swimming pool and water park complex just two years later. This was then joined by an ice rink now known as the Eis Arena Wolfsburg. The Allersee was made deeper again in 1987. It is currently 1230 metres long and 270 metres wide and contains nearly one million cubic metres of water.

In the 1990s, the service sector in Wolfsburg was relatively weak and there was a large drain on purchasing power into the surrounding region. This motivated the creation of the "AutoVision" concept, which Volkswagen presented to the city as a gift on the occasion of its 60th anniversary. The concept contained a multitude of measures designed to strengthen the quality of life in and competitiveness of the city of Wolfsburg. One of these measures was the creation of a "World of Experience" with the Allerpark at its core. Plans were made to establish a number of high-quality leisure facilities in the Allerpark area that would not only make the city of Wolfsburg a more attractive location, but also increase its service sector and create jobs. The company Wolfsburg AG was founded as the body responsible for the implementation of the "AutoVision" concept. The city of Wolfsburg and Volkswagen each have a 50-percent share in the public-private partnership. Wolfsburg AG has been coordinating the project development of the Allerpark since the end of the 1990s.

A start was made with the completion of the Volkswagen Arena, the home stadium of the VfL Wolfsburg football club, in 2002. The BadeLand Wolfsburg was also opened in the same year and replaced the city's former indoor swimming pool and water park, which had burnt down in 1998. The Allerpark was fully modernised and redesigned on the occasion of the German Federal Garden Show in 2004. This involved the creation of new features such as an additional lake and new hilly landscapes, for which the park received the German Landscape Architecture Award in 2005. The fact that the Allerpark constituted a large part of the event area alongside the gardens of Wolfsburg Castle also led to the creation of elements such as new car parks and areas for visitors using private transport. The Eis Arena Wolfsburg was opened in 2006. Over the last few years, a number of facilities that can be used for free have also been developed in the Allerpark, for example routes and circuits for in-line skaters and joggers.

A total of 350 new jobs were created in the Allerpark between 2000 and 2010. The park's attractions and facilities attract several millions of visitors every year. The most recent constructions to be added to the Allerpark are the AOK Stadium, which was opened in 2015 and hosts the home matches of the women's and youth teams of the VfL Wolfsburg football club, the VfL Center and the VfL Football World.

== Facilities ==
A wide variety of different "experience-oriented leisure facilities" have been created in the Allerpark in recent years. Alongside the AOK Stadium, the BadeLand Wolfsburg, the Eis Arena Wolfsburg and the Volkswagen Arena, the park has also welcomed a multitude of additional facilities developed by private investors. These have increased the range of attractions at the location in terms of both quality and quantity. Examples of the specialist facilities available at the Allerpark include the indoor football hall known as the SoccaFive Arena, the Monkeyman high ropes course and the WakePark water ski centre with the neighbouring BeachClub. The Allerpark is also home to the Strike Bowling and Event Center and a campsite located next to the Allersee lake.

Visitors to the Allerpark can choose to visit one of several different restaurants. The Colombian Pavilion, which originally formed part of the Expo 2000 world exposition, was rebuilt by the Allersee to house food & drink facilities. The Allerpark is used as a venue for a variety of events every year, for example the "Schützen- und Volksfest" fair and festival, the "Sommerfest im Allerpark" summer festival and the "Volkstriathlon" public triathlon event. In recent years, the Summer Festival in particular has proven to be a very popular event that attracts tens of thousands of visitors.

Some of the best-known facilities and attractions in the Allerpark include:

=== AOK Stadium ===
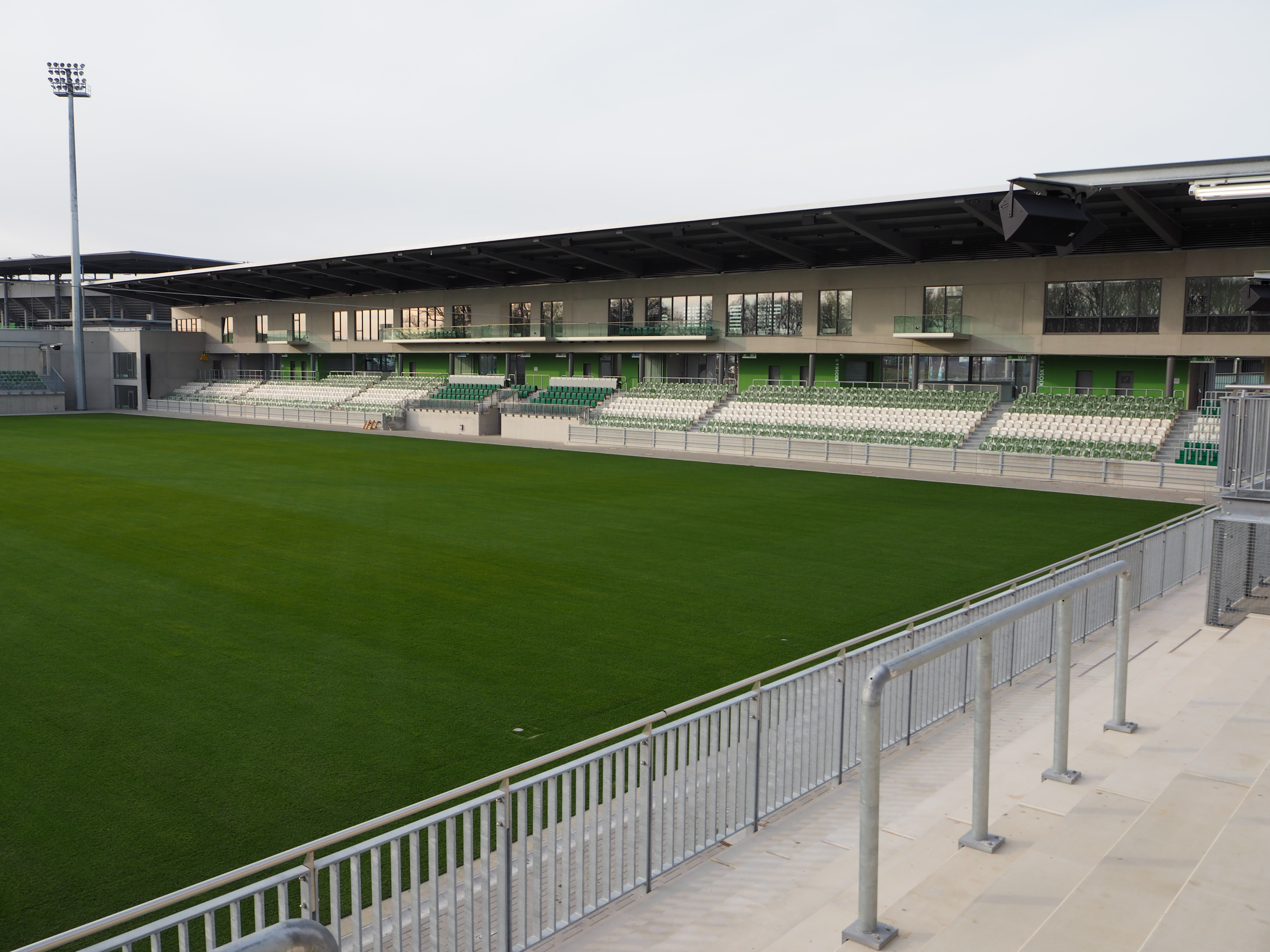
AOK Stadion (2015)

The AOK Stadium in the Allerpark was constructed between 2013 and 2015. It is the home stadium of the women's and youth teams of the VfL Wolfsburg football club. The new construction has played a particularly important role in further supporting and promoting women's football. The AOK Stadium is also home to the VfL Football World, an interactive exhibition about the club. It is located directly next to the Volkswagen Arena to the west of the Allersee lake.

=== BadeLand Wolfsburg ===
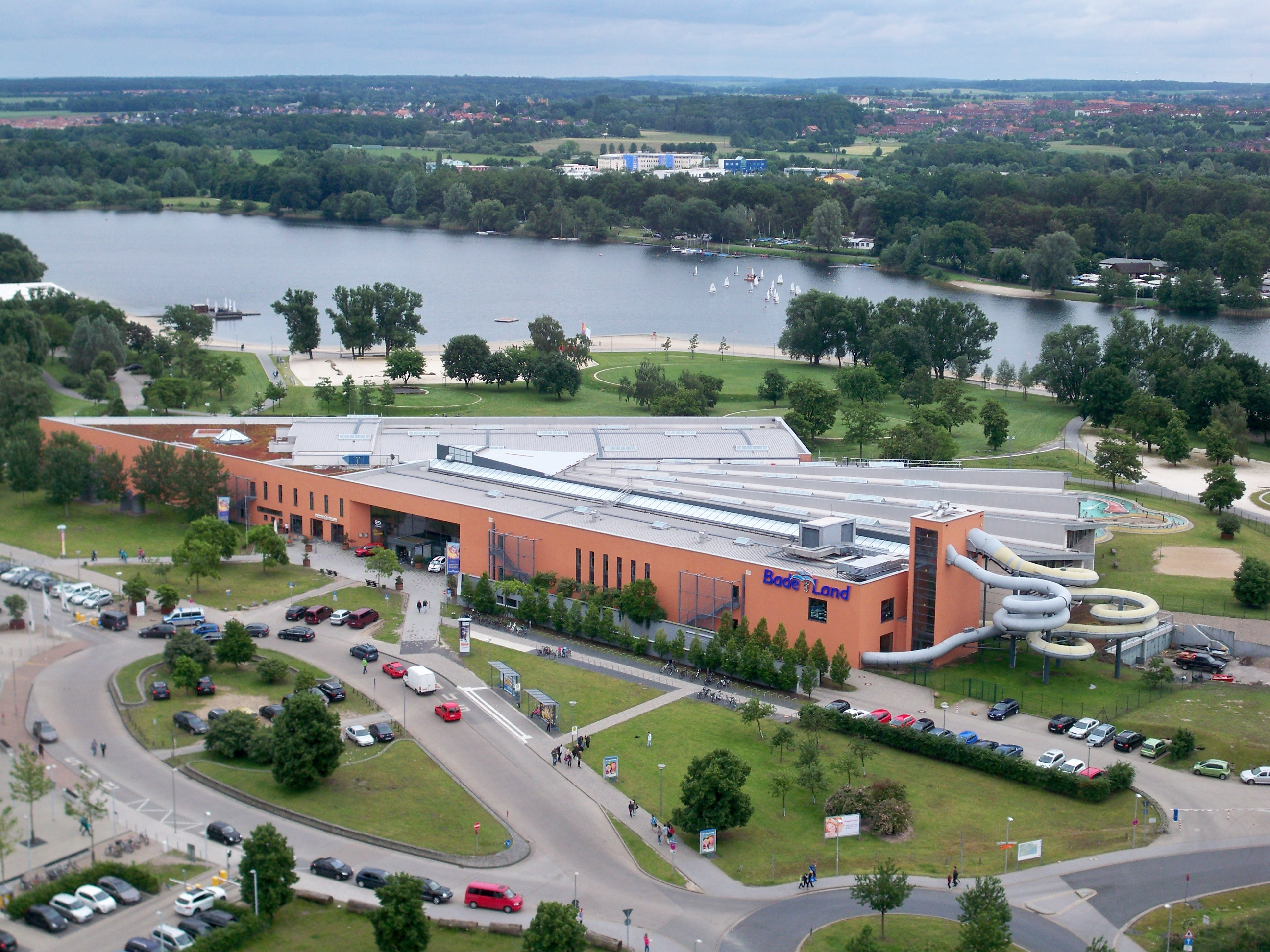
BadeLand Wolfsburg (2014)

The first swimming pool in the Allerpark was opened in 1977 but burnt to the ground in 1999 due to a fault. A new indoor swimming pool and water park was therefore constructed on the same site at a total cost of over 34 million euros. The BadeLand Wolfsburg was opened in 2002. It can hold up to 1700 visitors and covers a total area of 11,000 square metres, 3000 square metres of which contain swimming pools and water areas. The BadeLand Wolfsburg is therefore the largest indoor swimming pool and water park in Northern Germany and is well known both throughout the region and further afield. The BadeLand Wolfsburg is located next to the Eis Arena Wolfsburg to the north of the Allersee lake.

=== Eis Arena Wolfsburg ===
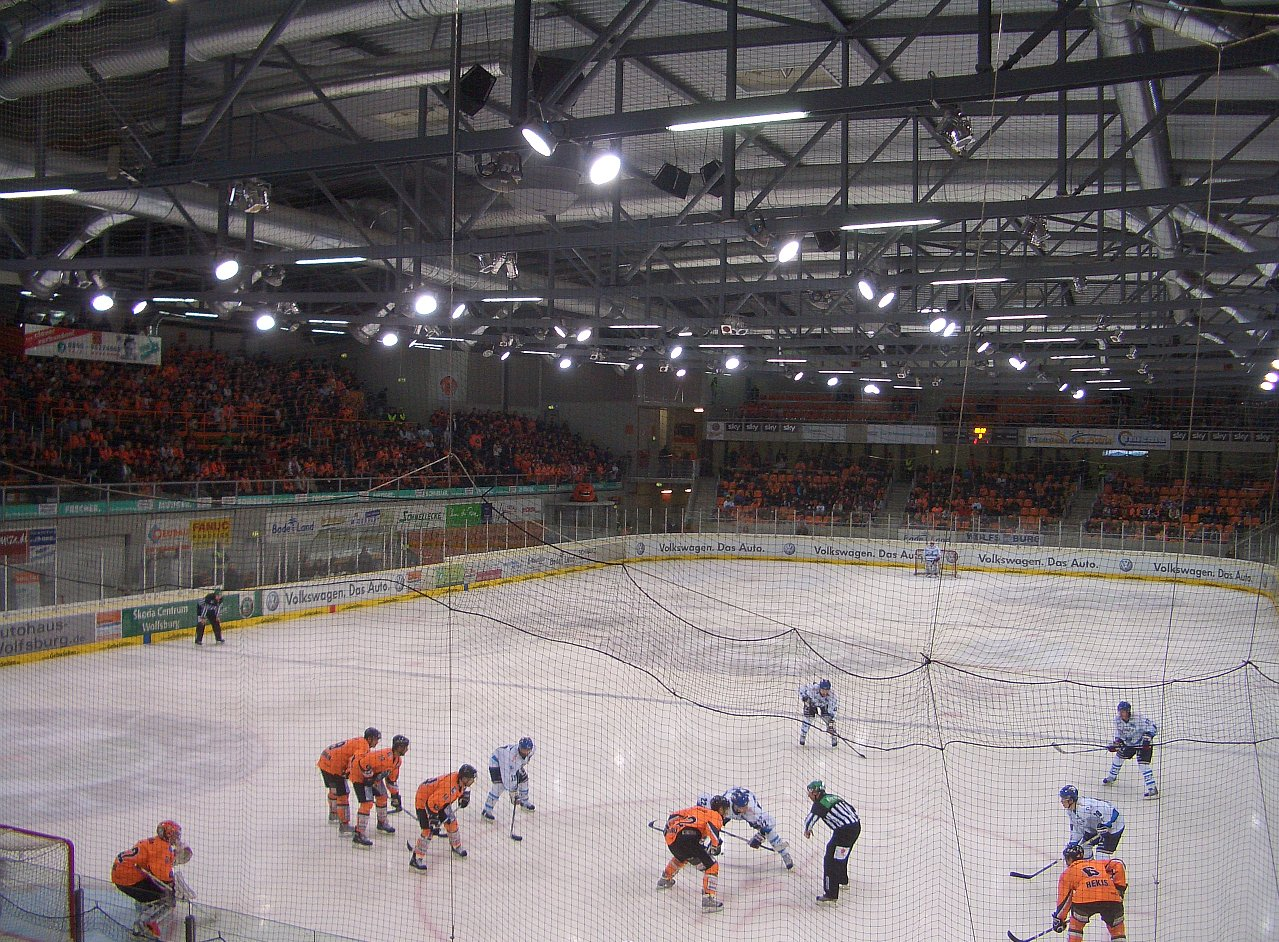
Eis Arena Wolfsburg (2009)

The Eis Arena Wolfsburg is an ice rink that is home to teams such as the Grizzlys Wolfsburg ice hockey team, which plays in the top German ice hockey league. The arena was opened in 2006 and is also used as a public ice rink. It also acts as an event venue, for example for the Lower Saxony State Figure Skating Championship in 2014. After constantly making significant losses, the Eis Arena Wolfsburg was sold back to the city of Wolfsburg by the Stadtwerke Wolfsburg public services organization at the end of 2014.

=== Volkswagen Arena ===
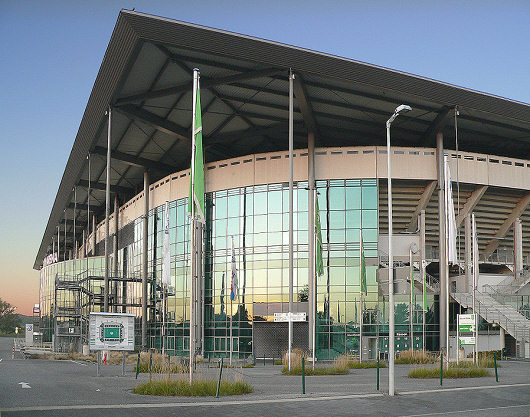
Volkswagen Arena (2005)

The Volkswagen Arena is the home stadium of the VfL Wolfsburg men's professional football team, which plays in the top German Bundesliga football league. It was opened in autumn 2002 and has a capacity of around 30,000 spectators. Construction work on the stadium took a total of 18 months and resulted in overall costs of 53 million euros. The first football match to take place at the Volkswagen Arena was between VfL Wolfsburg and VfB Stuttgart. One of the aims of the Volkswagen Arena was to strengthen the club's international ambitions, especially with regard to the Champions League. The Volkswagen Arena also offers function rooms for congresses, conferences and private events.

== Associations ==
The Allersee lake in the Allerpark is home to a multitude of different clubs and associations, for example the "Motorbootclub Wolfsburg", the "Sportfischerverein Wolfsburg" fishing club and the city's canoeing, rowing and yacht clubs. In fact, most of the water sports clubs located in the Allerpark have been around for longer than the park itself. The Vorsfelde and Wolfsburg location groups of the German Life-Saving Association (DLRG) are also based in the Allerpark. They play a particularly important role as the groups responsible for providing water rescue services on the Allersee. The fact that a large number of clubs and associations are located in or have relocated to the Allerpark is closely connected to the strategy of the city of Wolfsburg to place a special focus on supporting and promoting local sports clubs.
