= Wolfsberg (surname) =

Wolfsberg (German pronunciation: [ˈvɔlfsˌbɛʁk]) is a German surname. Notable people with the surname include:

- Dorthe Wolfsberg (born 1958), Danish sprinter
- Joon Wolfsberg (born 1992), German singer-songwriter
- Christian Wolfsberg, Danish marathon champion
- Tyra Wolfsberg, American bioinformatician

== See also ==
- Wolfsberg (disambiguation)
