= Tyra (given name) =

Tyra is a female given name. It may refer to:

== People ==
- Tyra Axnér (born 2002), Swedish handball player
- Tyra Banks (born 1973), American television personality
- Tyra Bolling (born 1985), American singer
- Tyra Calderwood (born 1990), Australian tennis player
- Tyra of Denmark (died 1000 AD), 10th-century Danish princess
- Tyra Ferrell (born 1962), American actress
- Tyra Gittens (born 1998), Olympic athlete from Trinidad and Tobago
- Tyra Caterina Grant (born 2008), Italian tennis player
- Tyra Grant (born 1988), American basketball player
- Tyra Hunter (1970–1995), African-American transgender woman
- Tyra Kleen (1874–1951), Swedish artist
- Tyra Lundgren (1897–1979), Swedish artist, designer, and writer
- Tyra Naha, Hopi American potter
- Tyra Perry, American softball coach
- Tyra Sanchez (born 1988), American drag queen
- Tyra Shackleford, Chickasaw textile artist
- Tyra Trotman, Barbadian politician
- Tyra Turner (born 1976), American beach volleyball player
- Tyra Vaughn (1923–2015), American actress
- Tyra White (born 1989), American basketball player
- Tyra Wolfsberg, American bioinformatician
- Tyra of Sweden, daughter of the Norse noble Styrbjörn the Strong

== Fictional characters ==
- Tyra Collette, a fictional character on the television series Friday Night Lights
- Tyra Hamilton, a fictional character on the CBS soap opera The Young and the Restless
- Tyra Nordbo, a character from the Man-Kzin Wars book series
- Tyra Ragnarsdottir, a character from The Saxon Stories book series and The Last Kingdom TV series

== See also ==
- Thyra (given name)
