= Wolfsburg (disambiguation) =

Wolfsburg is a city in Lower Saxony, Germany

Wolfsburg may also refer to:

- Wolfsburg Castle, in the city of Wolfsburg
- Wolfsburg (film), film
- Wolfsburg AG, a German company headquartered in Wolfsburg
- Wolfsburg-Unkeroda, a former municipality in the Wartburgkreis district of Thuringia, Germany
- VfL Wolfsburg, an association football team based in the German city of the same name

== See also ==
- Wolfsberg (disambiguation)
