= Wolfsberg =

Wolfsberg may refer to:

== Places ==
- Wolfsberg, Carinthia, a district capital in Carinthia, Austria
  - Wolfsberg Airport, a private use airport located near Wolfsberg, Carinthia, Austria
  - Wolfsberg Castle (Carinthia), in Wolfsberg, Carinthia
- Wolfsberg Castle (Harz), a ruined castle in the Harz mountains, Saxony-Anhalt, Germany
- Wolfsberg Castle (Obertrubach), a ruined castle in Obertrubach, in Franconian Switzerland, Bavaria, Germany
- Wolfsberg (district), a district of Carinthia, Austria
- Wolfsberg im Schwarzautal, a municipality in Styria, Austria
- Wolfsberg (Eggenfelden), a district of Eggenfelden, Bavaria, Germany
- Wolfsberg (Sangerhausen), a district of Sangerhausen, Saxony-Anhalt, Germany
- Wolfsberg, Thuringia, a former municipality, today part of Ilmenau, in the district Ilm-Kreis, Thuringia, Germany
- Wolfsberg, the German name for Gărâna village, Brebu Nou Commune, Caraş-Severin County, Romania

== Hills ==
- Wolfsberg (Calenberg Land), a hill in Lower Saxony, Germany
- Wolfsberg (Haardt), a hill on which lies Wolfsburg Castle, Neustadt, Rhineland-Palatinate, Germany
- Wolfsberg (Hohegeiß), a hill in the Harz mountains, Germany
- Wolfsberg (Ilsenburg), a hill in the Harz mountains, Germany
- Wolfsberg (Saxon Switzerland), a hill in Saxony, Germany

== In other uses ==
- Wolfsberger AC, a football club from Wolfsberg, Carinthia
- ATSV Wolfsberg, a football club in the third-tier Austrian Regional League Central
- Wolfsberg, a Nazi concentration camp near Breslau, where Holocaust survivor David Weiss Halivni and Hermann Kahan were taken during World War II
- Wolfsberg Aircraft Corporation, a Belgian aircraft manufacturer
- Wolfsberg Group, a private association of eleven global banks, founded in 2000 at the Schloss Wolfsberg, near Ermatingen, Switzerland
- Wolfsberg (adelsätt), a Swedish noble family

== People ==
- Wolfsberg (surname)

== See also ==
- Wolfsburg (disambiguation)
