= Volkswagen Arena =

Football stadium in Wolfsburg, Germany

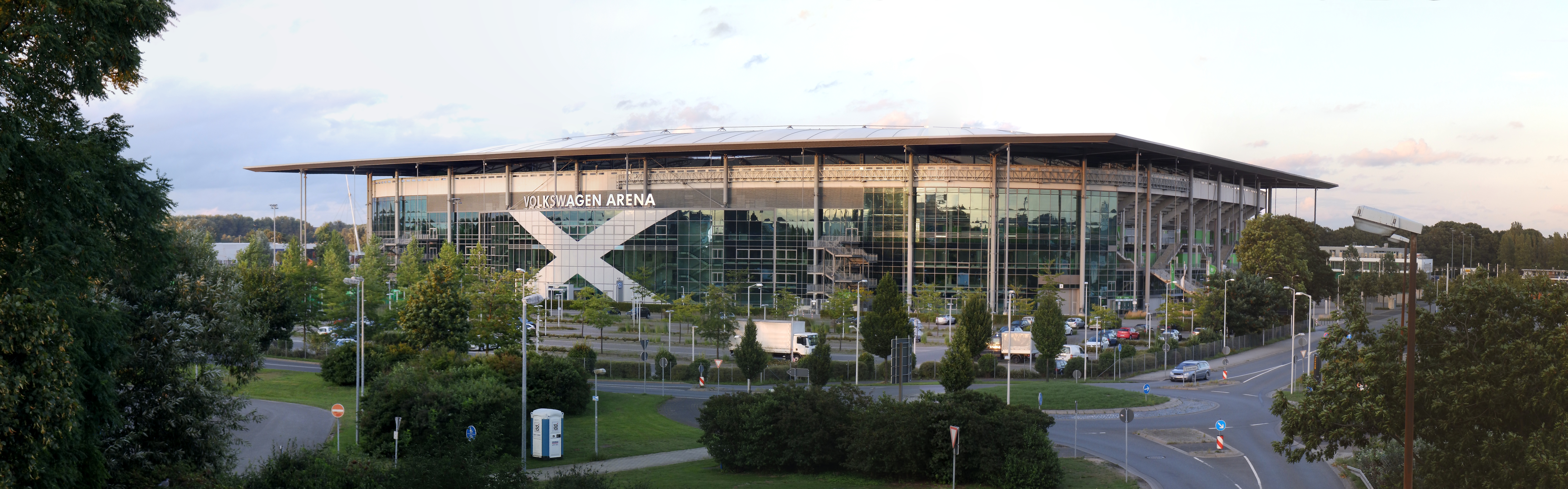
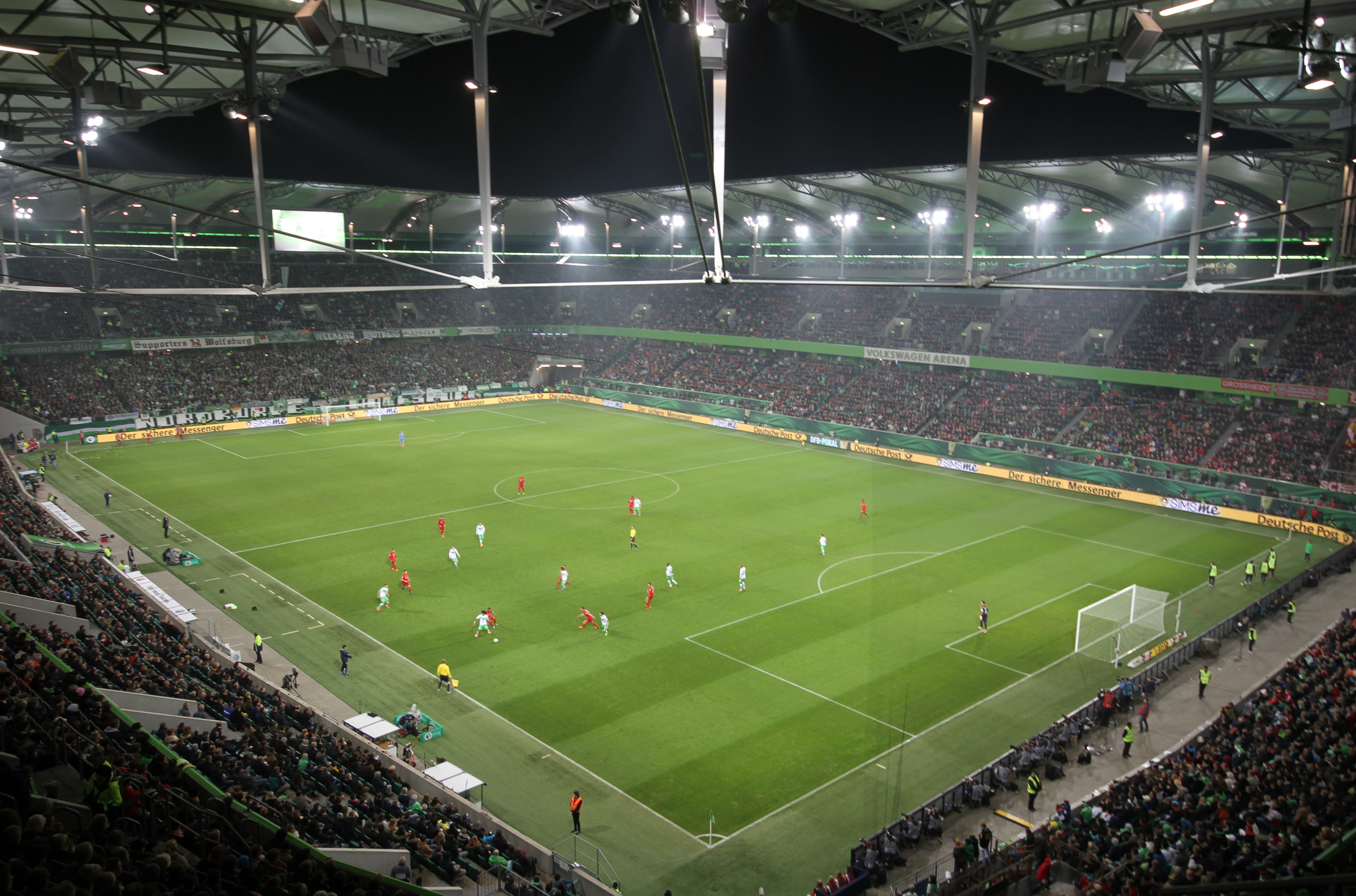
- Interactive map of Volkswagen Arena
- Full name: Volkswagen Arena
- Location: Wolfsburg, Germany
- Coordinates: 52°25′58″N 10°48′14″E
- Owner: Wolfsburg AG
- Operator: VfL Wolfsburg-Fußball GmbH
- Capacity: 30,000 (League matches); 26,000 (International matches)
- Executive suites: 31
- Surface: hybrid grass
- Field size: 105×68 m

Construction
- Built: 2001–2002
- Opened: 13 December 2002
- Cost: €53 million
- Architects: HPP, Dusseldorf nb+b, Wolfsburg

Tenants
- VfL Wolfsburg (2002–present); Germany national football team (selected matches)

Volkswagen Arena (German pronunciation: [ˈfɔlksvaːɡn̩ ʔaˌʁeːnaː]; also known as the VfL Wolfsburg Arena due to UEFA sponsorship regulations) is a football stadium in the German city of Wolfsburg, Lower Saxony. It was opened in 2002 and named after the automotive group Volkswagen AG. The Volkswagen Arena has a capacity of 30,000: 22,000 seats and 8,000 standing places. It is located in the Allerpark and is the home stadium of the football team VfL Wolfsburg.

== History ==
In 1997, VfL Wolfsburg was promoted to the Bundesliga, the German premier league, which led the Volkswagen Group to reinforce its commitment to the club. Discussions on the construction of a new stadium began at the end of 1997 because the VfL-Stadion am Elsterweg did not meet the requirements of the Bundesliga. Construction of the new stadium finally began in 2001. The stadium was initially referred to as the "Arena an der Berliner Brücke" ("Arena by the Berlin Bridge"). At the time, the cost of the new stadium was estimated at 99.8 million DM. The constructor of the Volkswagen Arena was the Wolfsburg AG. Both the city and the Volkswagen Group each own half of the company. Alongside the start of construction of the arena, even more leisure and recreation projects were realised in the Allerpark, including the BadeLand Wolfsburg water park. The topping-out ceremony for the stadium took place in May 2002. The work was completed in December 2002 after a total of 19 months of construction.

The stadium was officially opened on 13 December 2002 and cost a total of €53 million. The Kicker sports magazine called the Volkswagen Arena a "temple with a glass facade". Other media connected the opening of the stadium with VfL Wolfsburg's ambition to play in the Champions League. The number of spectators at home games significantly increased in the second half of the 2002-03 season. The first football match at the stadium was played between VfL Wolfsburg and VfB Stuttgart. In April 2003, tickets for the match against Hannover 96 at the Volkswagen Arena were sold out for the first time. The first international match at the stadium took place in June of the same year between Germany and Canada. In the following years, the stadium has been used for concerts performed by artists such as Herbert Grönemeyer (2003), Anastacia (2005) and Elton John (2006). The celebration for the 25th million VW Golf produced was also held in the Volkswagen Arena.

In 2008, the Volkswagen Arena saw a record attendance. In the same year, a three-storey fan building was built to the northwest of the stadium. In the following year, a number of changes were made in and around the stadium, for example the construction of new training grounds in 2009 and the refurbishment of the box seats, among others, in 2012. The largest expansion in the immediate vicinity of the Volkswagen Arena began in 2013, when the 5,000-capacity AOK Stadium was built next to the arena. This is now used by teams such as the VfL Wolfsburg women's and youth teams. The VfL Center, a new three-storey training centre for the professional football players, was also built. It was initially criticised by some fans.

By moving the professional footballers from the Volkswagen Arena into the VfL Center, space was freed up for a chapel as well as for other facilities. The VfL FußballWelt (VfL FootballWorld) opened in 2015 in the immediate vicinity of the Volkswagen Arena, providing space for an interactive exhibition about VfL Wolfsburg. This traces back to the club's football museum from 2004.

== Characteristics ==
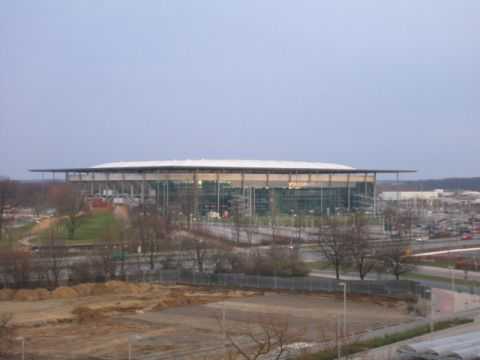
View from the west side (2004)

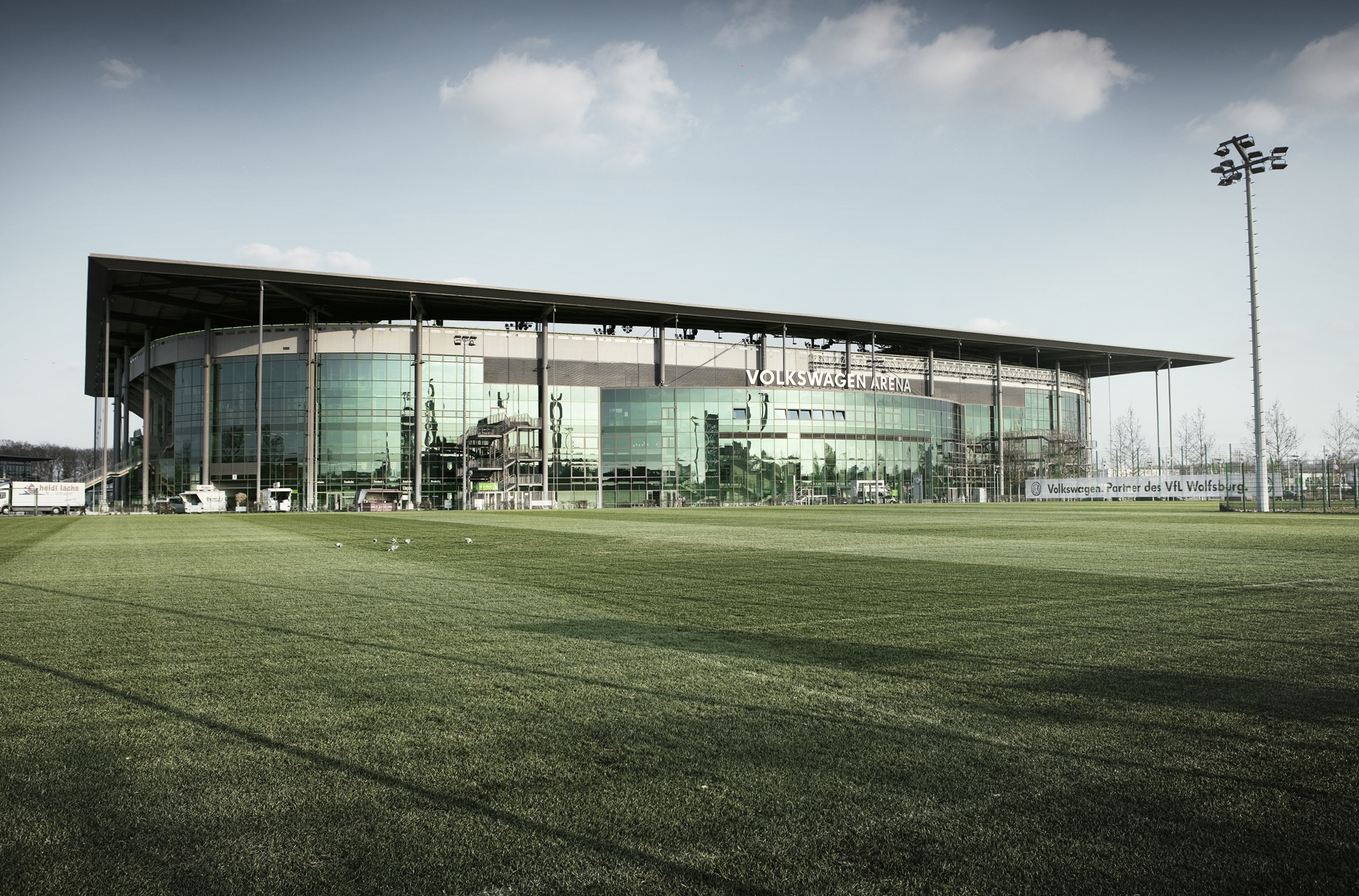
Facade of the stadium (2012)

The most striking feature of the stadium is its sophisticated roof, which was designed as a truss-supported membrane structure. 32 radial trusses, each 40 metres in length, make up the support system for the fire-retardant PVC membrane, which is 15,000 square metres large. The membrane is translucent, aims to improve the atmosphere in the stadium for the spectators and supports the natural growth of the grass on the pitch.

=== Seating ===
The Volkswagen Arena is a two-tier stadium with a surrounding promenade. The lower level has an inclination of approximately 25 degrees, the upper level 40 degrees. The ground area of the entire plot is around 115,000 square metres and the floor space of the stadium is around 28,000 square metres. The stadium's capacity of 30,000 consists of 22,000 seats and 8,000 standing places. The standing places can be converted into 4,000 seats. The guest block of the Volkswagen Arena contains 1,886 seats and 900 standing places with separate kiosks and toilet areas. All seats in the Volkswagen Arena are completely covered.

A total of 31 boxes with 332 seats are available at the stadium, which also offers 198 so-called Executive Seats, which are integrated into the VIP block, and 1,434 Business Seats with direct access to restaurants. The Volkswagen Arena is home to a 102-square-metre-large Skylounge above both grandstands with 35 seats. This offers a view of the entire stadium and is also used as a venue for other events and even weddings. The control room, which houses systems such as the fire alarm system and police equipment, is located above the Skylounge.

The special features of the Volkswagen Arena include seats and spaces for people with disabilities and their companions. Spectators with impaired vision are provided with a total of 10 seats with headphones so that they can hear the commentator during the match. Furthermore, 80 spaces are available for spectators in wheelchairs. Families with children can book seats in a separate area at the Volkswagen Arena. VfL Wolfsburg also offers childcare during all home games at the stadium. A separate area is provided for younger and shorter spectators so that they can get a better view of the match.

=== Technology ===
VfL Wolfsburg also became the first Bundesliga club to play in an LED-lit stadium when the Volkswagen Arena was equipped with a new LED floodlight system at the start of 2017. The old floodlighting of the Volkswagen Arena consists of more than 170 elements with lamps, each weighing about 35 kilos. They were all mounted under the roof and together produce about 1,500 lux. The 84 speakers in the stadium, which weigh 120 kilos each and are likewise mounted under the roof, produce a total of 600 watts. There are also two video walls covering an area of 53 square metres in the stadium. The pitch is covered in hybrid grass, which is natural grass that is reinforced with synthetic fibres, thus improving its weatherability. The Volkswagen Arena was the first Bundesliga stadium to introduce such a system. From the outset, the pitch has been heated so that matches can be played regardless of ice and snow.

The Volkswagen Arena was also the first Bundesliga stadium to debut 5G technology on match day 5 of the 2019/2020 campaign against Hoffenheim. 5G technology, when it comes to Bundesliga stadiums, is done as a collaborative effort between the DFL and Vodafone. In addition to the debut of 5G, select fans were also able to experience the debut of a new real time football stat app that was done as a collaborative effort between the DFL and French augmented reality company, Immersiv.io. The app is able to display stats such as, enhanced match statistics and player performance, stats that were once not always available to the stadium attending fans in real-time. The data is fed to the app via Bundesliga subsidiary company Sportec Solutions, which is helped on by its partnership with ChyronHego, who introduced new visual tracking technology which allows for more accurate data acquisition.

== Ownership ==
The builder and owner of the Volkswagen Arena has always been the Wolfsburg AG. In 2002, the stadium was handed over to the VfL Wolfsburg-Fußball GmbH, which has been responsible for its operation ever since. 100 percent of the shares in the company are held by Volkswagen AG, which also sponsors the VfL Wolfsburg men's, women's and youth teams. Volkswagen's commitment to VfL Wolfsburg was already the subject of media reports before the construction of the Volkswagen Arena. In recent years, the link between the Volkswagen Group and the football club has also been discussed several times. The financing of the Volkswagen Arena was split evenly between Volkswagen and Wolfsburg AG. Given that Volkswagen also owns half of the shares of Wolfsburg AG, the city of Wolfsburg owns a calculated share of 25 percent. The Norddeutsche Landesbank provided a loan running into millions of euros for the financing of the Volkswagen Arena, which is to be repaid over the course of 29 years.

== Matches ==
The first international match of the Germany national football team in the Volkswagen Arena to date was held on 1 June 2003, when Germany defeated the Canada national team with a final score of 4–1. It was the only match for Die Mannschaft there until 20 March 2019, when they held an international friendly against the Serbia national football team, with a final score of 1-1. This match marked as the kick off of Germany's new partnership with Volkswagen.

Furthermore, the men's national teams of Poland and Croatia played at the stadium in the run-up to the 2006 FIFA World Cup, when Poland won the friendly match with a final score of 1–0. The Volkswagen Arena was also used as a venue of the 2011 FIFA Women's World Cup. During the tournament, the stadium was called the "Arena in Allerpark Wolfsburg". The temporary renaming of the stadium was welcomed by the operators because it attracted more attention to the Allerpark, thus enabling it to become better known. The German women's national football team was eliminated from the tournament with a 1–0 loss against the Japanese women's national team in Wolfsburg.

=== 2011 FIFA Women's World Cup matches ===
Date	Time (CET)	Team #1	Result	Team #2	Round	Spectators
27 June 2011	18:00	Mexico	1–1	England	Group B	18,702
3 July 2011	18:15	Brazil	3–0	Norway	Group D	26,067
6 July 2011	20:45	Sweden	2–1	United States	Group C	23,468
9 July 2011	20:45	Germany	0–1 (a.e.t)	Japan	Quarter-finals	26,067

== Panorama ==
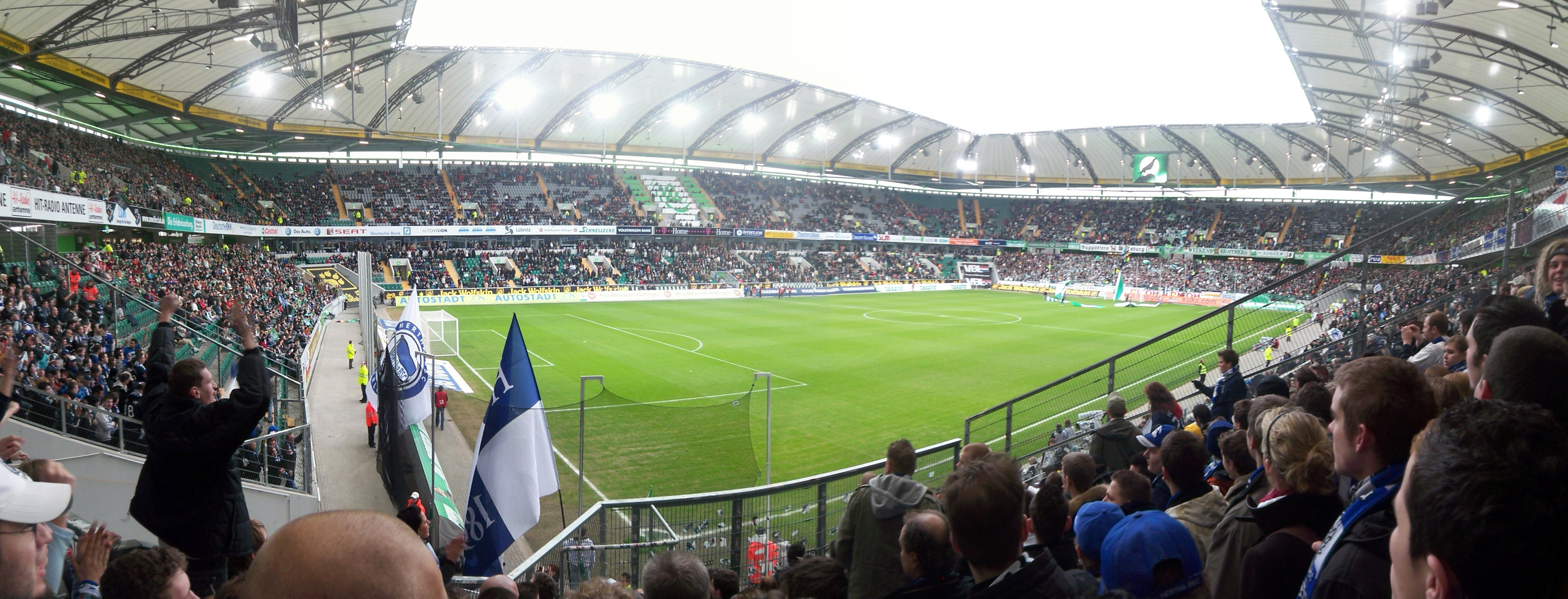
Panorama of the Volkswagen Arena

== Milestone matches ==
15 December 2002	(Germany) VfL Wolfsburg	1–2	VfB Stuttgart (Germany)	2002–03 Bundesliga; First Bundesliga Match
17:30 CET	Marić 76' (pen.)		T. Schneider 35'; Meira 55'	Attendance: 24,147; Referee: Markus Merk

12 July 2003	(Germany) VfL Wolfsburg	2–0	Marek Dupnitsa (Bulgaria)	2003 UEFA Intertoto Cup; First UEFA Intertoto Cup Match
20:00 CEST	Petrov 43'; Munteanu 90' (pen.)			Attendance: 6,350; Referee: Gylfi Thór Orrason (Iceland)

24 October 2006	(Germany) VfL Wolfsburg	1–0	SC Freiburg (Germany)	2006–07 DFB-Pokal; First DFB-Pokal Match
19:30 CEST	Hanke 69'			Attendance: 6,497; Referee: Christian Schößling
