= Tyra (Třinec) =

Village in Třinec, Czech Republic

Coordinates: 49°37′19″N 18°38′53″E

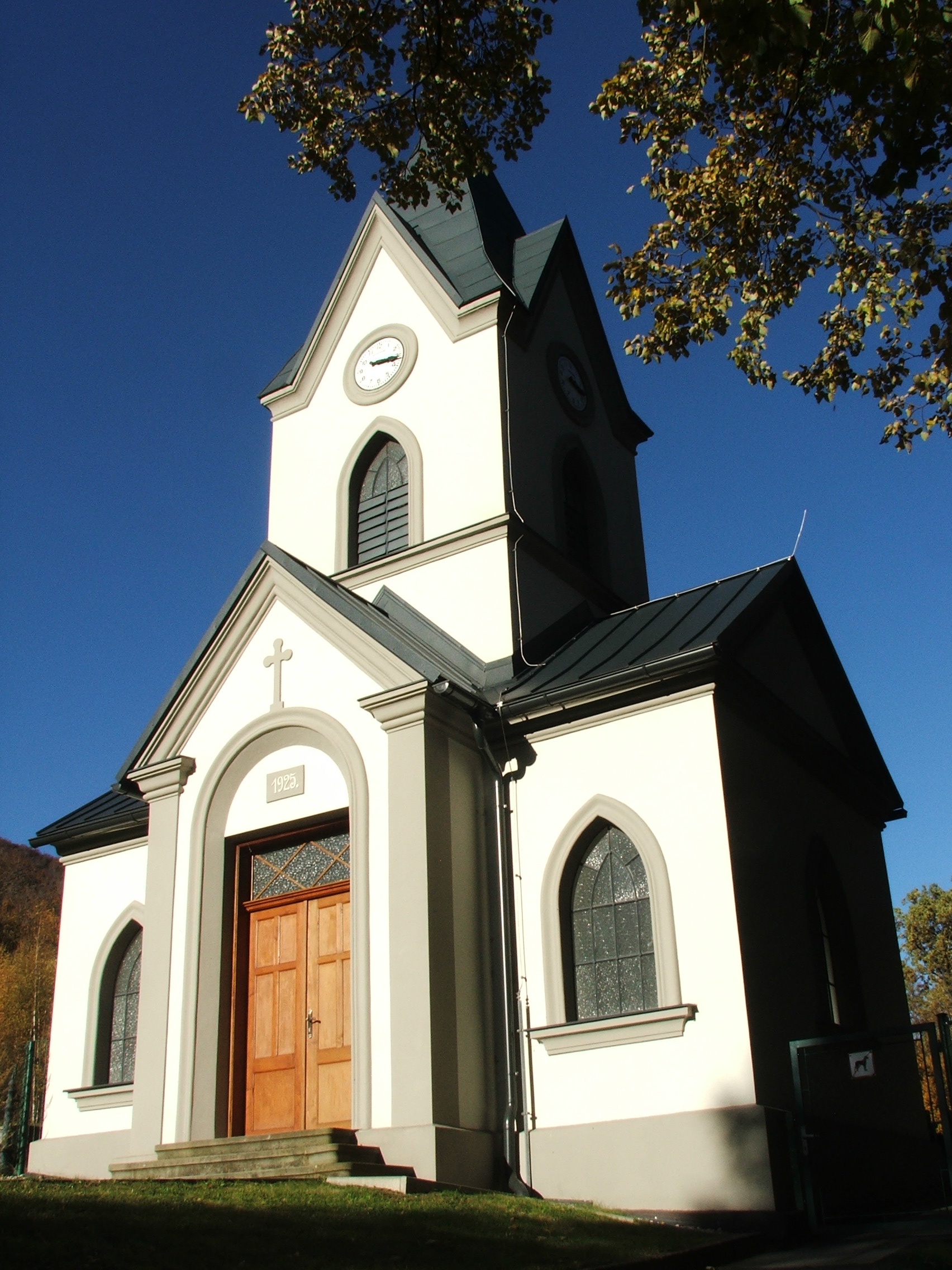
Lutheran cemetery chapel in Tyra

Tyra (Polish: Tyra) is a village in Frýdek-Místek District, Moravian-Silesian Region, Czech Republic. It was a separate municipality but became administratively a part of Třinec in 1980. Tyrka flows through the village. It has a population of 445 (1 January 2008) and lies in the historical region of Cieszyn Silesia.

The name of the village is of topographic origins derived from an older name of the local river Tyrka (also known as Tyra).

== History ==
The village was first mentioned in 1577 in urbarium which states that it had only one citizen, so the village was in the very early process of formation. Originally it was part of the village Oldřichovice (in 1657 described as der Oldrzychowitzer dielniczen andern seyten biß zu dem Waßer Tyra gelegen) but grew to become an independent village. It belonged then to the Duchy of Teschen, a fee of the Kingdom of Bohemia and a part of the Habsburg monarchy.

After Revolutions of 1848 in the Austrian Empire a modern municipal division was introduced in the re-established Austrian Silesia. The village as a municipality was subscribed to the political district of Teschen and the legal district of Jablunkau. According to the censuses conducted in 1880, 1890, 1900 and 1910 the population of the municipality grew from 506 in 1880 to 510 in 1910 with a majority being native Polish-speakers (dropping from 97.8% in 1880 to 94.2% in 1910) accompanied by German-speaking (at most 27 or 5.4% in 1910) and Czech-speaking people (at most 2 in 1910). In terms of religion in 1910 the majority were Protestants (91.3%), followed by Roman Catholics (39 or 7.7%) and Jews (6 or 1%). The village was also traditionally inhabited by Cieszyn Vlachs, speaking Cieszyn Silesian dialect.

After World War I, fall of Austria-Hungary, Polish–Czechoslovak War and the division of Cieszyn Silesia in 1920, it became a part of Czechoslovakia. Following the Munich Agreement, in October 1938 together with the Zaolzie region it was annexed by Poland, administratively adjoined to Cieszyn County of Silesian Voivodeship. It was then annexed by Nazi Germany at the beginning of World War II. After the war it was restored to Czechoslovakia.

== See also ==
- Polish minority in the Czech Republic
- Zaolzie
