= Wolfsburg AG =

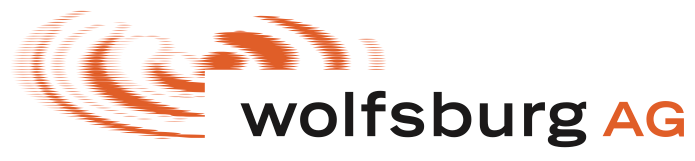
- Formerly: GIZ Gründungs- und Innovationszentrum GmbH
- Company type: Aktiengesellschaft
- Founded: 1999; 27 years ago
- Founders: City of Wolfsburg, Volkswagen Group
- Headquarters: Wolfsburg, Germany
- Area served: Wolfsburg, Lower Saxony
- Key people: Julius von Ingelheim (Speaker of the Board of Directors); Klaus Mohrs (Chairman of the Supervisory Board)
- Revenue: ▲€ 507 million (2013)
- Number of employees: ▲126 (permanent, 2013) ▼8,659 (temporary, 2013)
- Parent: City of Wolfsburg, Volkswagen Group
- Website: wolfsburg-ag.com

Wolfsburg AG is a German company headquartered in Wolfsburg. It was founded in 1999 with the goal of enhancing the attractiveness of the city of Wolfsburg. Wolfsburg AG implements the AutoVision concept, which Volkswagen gave the city on the occasion of its 60th birthday. It is a stock corporation (Aktiengesellschaft) under German law, in which the city of Wolfsburg and the Volkswagen Group have equal shares. Today, Wolfsburg AG is considered to be a prime example of economic development in Germany. Its activities have contributed significantly to more than halving the unemployment rate of the city of Wolfsburg.

== History ==
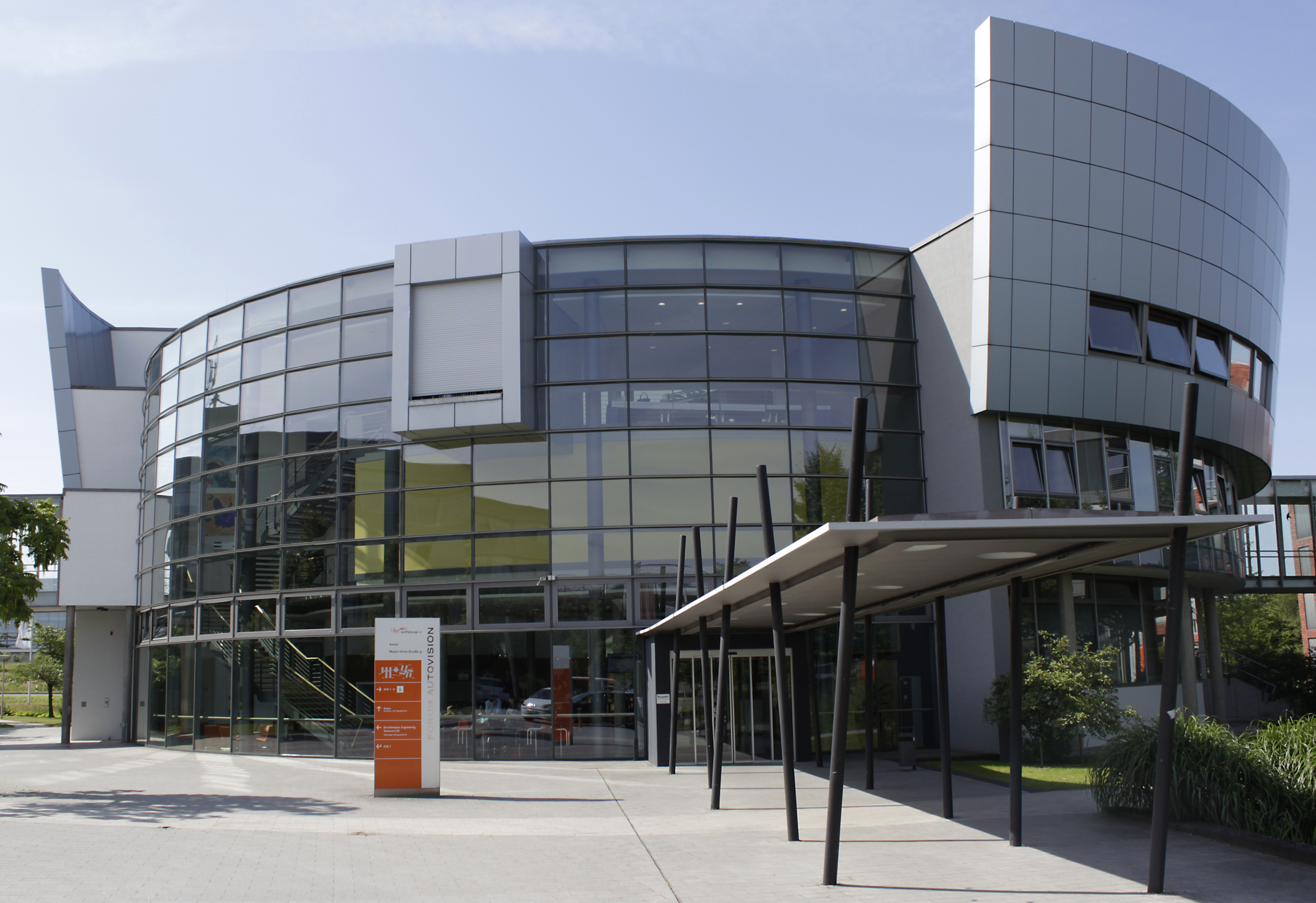
Corporate Headquarters of Wolfsburg AG (2011)

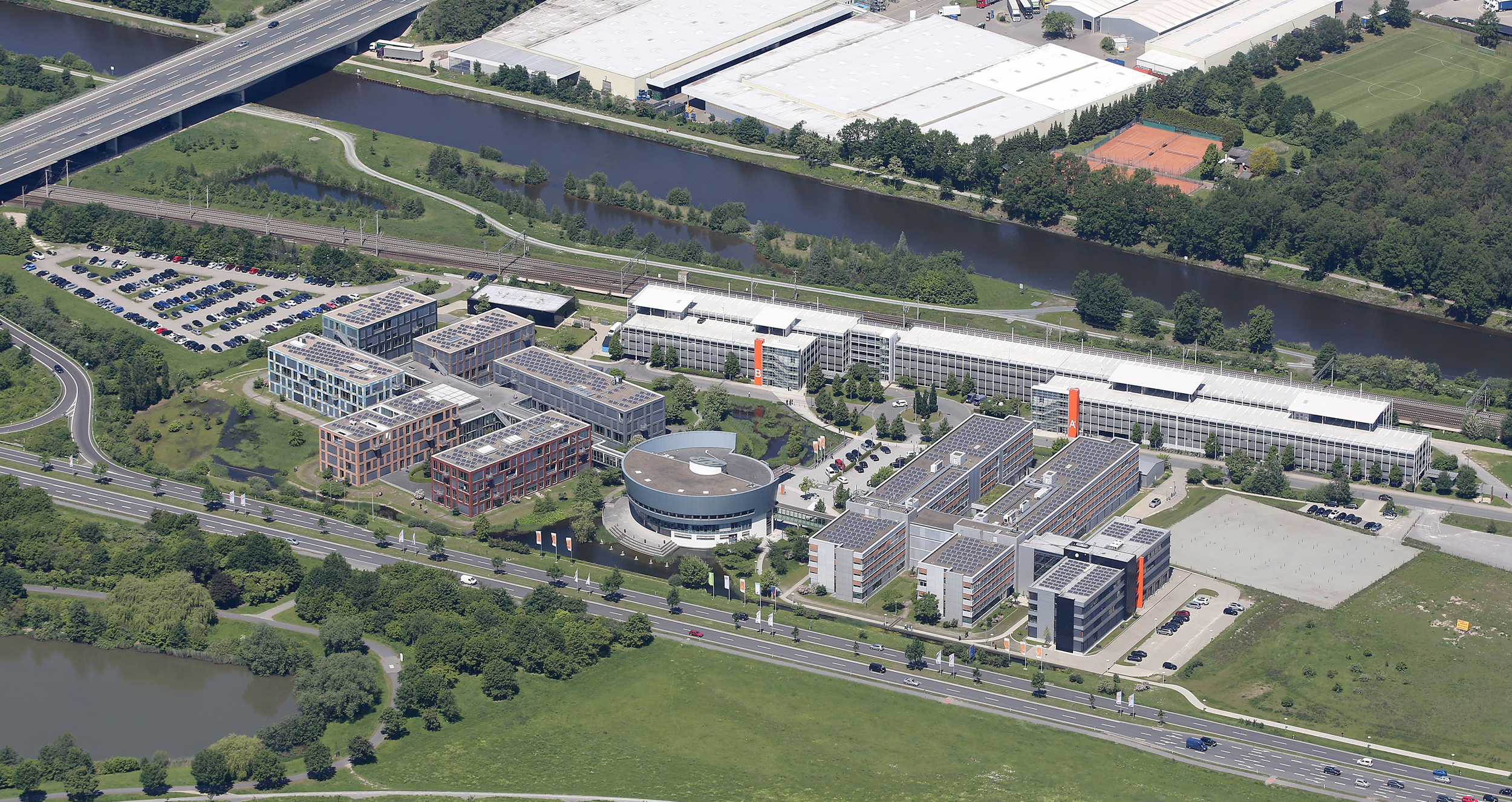
Forum AutoVision (aerial photography, 2013)

The city of Wolfsburg became a lot less attractive during the 1990s. The reason for this was the regional economic structure: about 85 percent of all employees belonged to the Volkswagen Group in 1995. Over 50 percent fewer people were working in the service sector compared to the national average. In addition, other German automotive industry locations had a considerably higher density of regional suppliers. The city of Wolfsburg was losing purchasing power in the realm of approximately 200 to 300 million euros per year. The city's tax revenues fell by almost a third in the wake of the Volkswagen crisis between 1991 and 1994. Observers later compared the situation to that of Detroit. In the course of the 1990s, the city of Wolfsburg and the Volkswagen Group finally agreed on the idea of working together to deal with the structural problems.

This was the source of motivation for drawing up the AutoVision concept. The Volkswagen Group referred to it as a strategy to "establish an automotive cluster". It was created with the support of the consulting firm McKinsey & Company and included a wide range of ideas for enhancing the quality of life and competitiveness in Wolfsburg. One of the most important ideas was the establishment of an "adventure world" that would extend over the entire city. Measures in the field of economic development were intended to ensure a reduction in the dependence of the Wolfsburg region on the automotive industry, as well as the creation of new jobs especially in the service sector, thereby reducing unemployment. The city of Wolfsburg and the Volkswagen Group founded Wolfsburg AG in 1997 in order to put the AutoVision concept into practice.

The company was created after the "GIZ Gründungs- und Innovationszentrum GmbH" limited company was converted into a stock corporation. The city of Wolfsburg and Volkswagen each hold a 50 percent share in Wolfsburg AG. In the beginning, the business operations of Wolfsburg AG covered four task areas: the InnovationsCampus, Supplier Park, Adventure World and PersonnelServiceAgency. While the InnovationsCampus promoted the creation of new businesses, the Supplier Park enabled additional suppliers from the automotive industry and related industries to become established in the region. The aim of the Adventure World idea was to provide quality leisure activities in the city of Wolfsburg in order to increase the city’s attractiveness, while giving the service sector a boost at the same time. The tasks of the Personnel Service Agency included taking care of recruitment (including temporary employment) and employee qualifications in particular.

== Structure ==
Wolfsburg AG is headquartered at the AutoVision Forum located in Wolfsburg's Hageberg district. The company owns and operates the site, which boasts a floor space of approximately 27,000 square meters. Essential components of the building complex are the Center for Simultaneous Engineering and the InnovationsCampus. Between the two lies the Arena: offices, catering, conference and event facilities are housed in this central building.

The objective of Wolfsburg AG is to promote the economic structure and the development of employment opportunities primarily in Wolfsburg and in the region to create jobs and improve quality of life". The share capital of Wolfsburg AG is 10.1 million euros. It is divided into 10.1 million no-par-value registered shares (common shares). These shares are not traded on a stock exchange and may only be transferred with the approval of the annual general meeting.

Wolfsburg AG is represented by two members of the executive board or one board member and a procurator. The executive board currently consists of four people, with Julius von Ingelheim appointed as its spokesman. The supervisory board consists of 18 people, who are appointed in equal parts by the city of Wolfsburg and the Volkswagen Group. The Chairman of the Supervisory Board is Klaus Mohrs, who has been serving as mayor of Wolfsburg since 2012.

Wolfsburg AG is financed primarily by the activities of the PersonnelServiceAgency., which is called AutoVision Zeitarbeit and was founded as a joint venture with a Volkswagen subsidiary in 2013. The company provides specialized and supporting staff who are employed during work peaks and the holiday period. Wolfsburg AG is also involved in other enterprises, for example in the Gewerbeakademie Wolfsburg (Wolfsburg Commercial Academy), the Neue Schule Wolfsburg (Wolfsburg New School) and the Wolfsburger Energieagentur (Wolfsburg Energy Agency).

== Operations ==
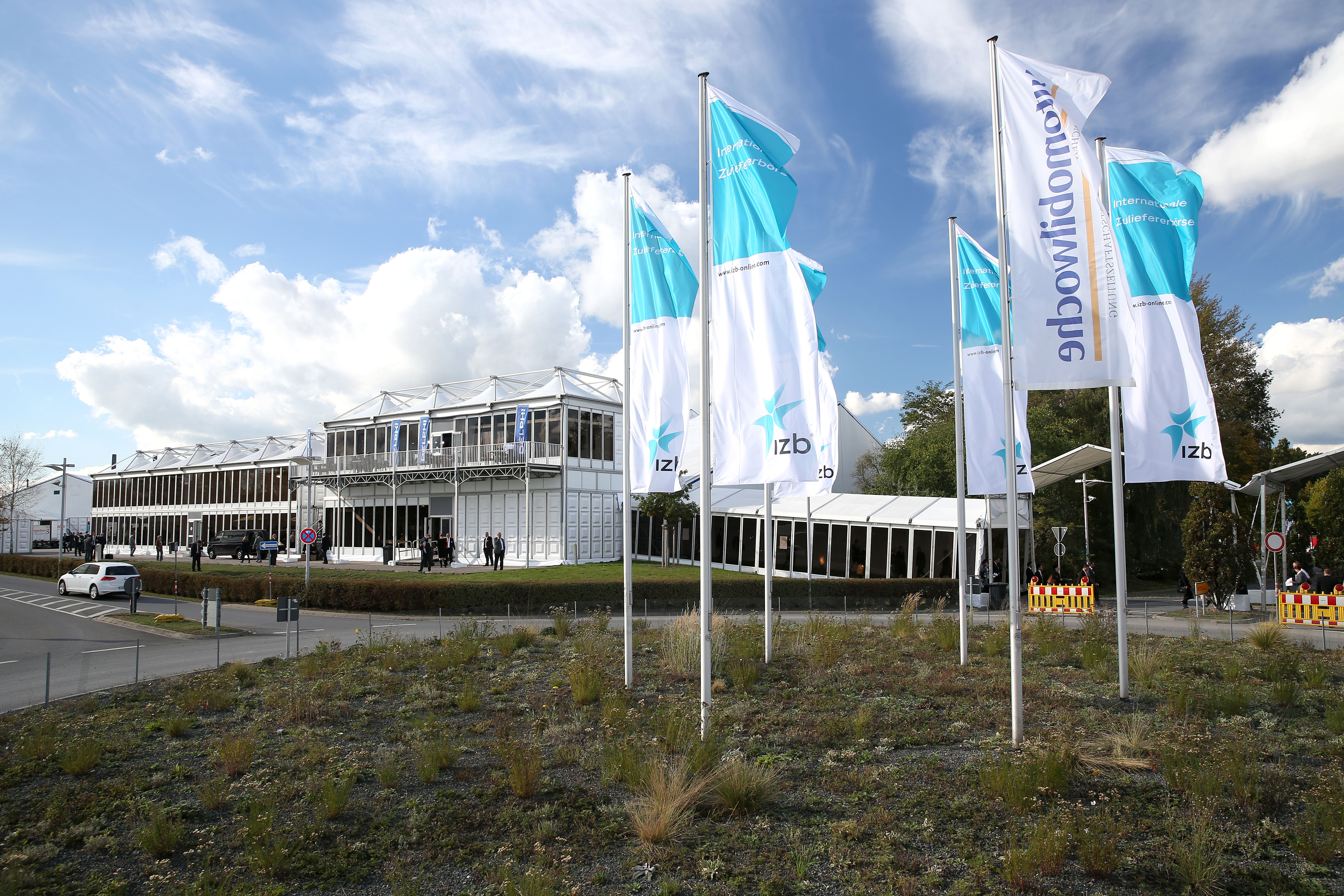
International Suppliers Fair (2014)

The company is also active in the fields of education, health, energy, leisure and mobility as well as in business development. The Agency for Intercultural Business Relations, for example, acts as a service provider for other companies that want to qualify their employees for a stay abroad. The range of activities in the area of private and occupational health spans from the education and supervision of staff to the development and commercialization of preventive healthcare services. Together with Wolfsburg's public utilities, the Wolfsburg Energy Agency provides citizens, businesses and municipalities with advice in all matters relating to energy and energy efficiency in particular.

Wolfsburg AG also funds a range of leisure activities designed to increase the attractiveness of the city of Wolfsburg and the region as a location for living and tourism. The Allerpark plays an important role in this area: Wolfsburg AG built the Volkswagen Arena in the park in 2002 and has remained its proprietor right up to the present day. The Allerpark is even home to an ice hockey stadium and a public swimming complex. Wolfsburg AG is responsible for the park management of the Allerpark, as well as project development and the acquisition of operators and investors.

Wolfsburg AG also gives special attention to the automotive industry, which it considers to be a key factor in economic development. In addition to promoting the establishment of suppliers in the region, Wolfsburg AG also supports industry networking and research initiatives in the field of mobility and even organizes conventions and exhibitions. The annual International Suppliers Fair (IZB), for example, is one of the largest events for automotive industry suppliers.
