= Tyra Shackleford =

American Chickasaw textile artist

Tyra Shackleford (born in Ada, Oklahoma) is a Chickasaw textile artist who specializes in various hand woven techniques. Her three most prominent weaving techniques are sprang, fingerweaving, and twinning, which all date back prior to European contact, She has opened her traditional form of art to more conceptual and wearable art.

Her crafts are exhibited across the United States since 2011. Shackleford's goal with her art is to preserve her Chickasaw culture and traditions and educate viewers.

== Biography ==
Shackleford was born in Ada, Oklahoma. Both of her parents were instructors; her father Randy taught math and computer science while her mom taught chemistry. As a child her father introduced her to her culture and the Chickasaw community. Shackleford attended Chickasaw community council meetings and performed dance demonstrations such as the stomp dance. Along with stomp dances, she attended language and art classes where she learned traditional weaving techniques. She has cited Wisey Narcomey, a Seminole elder, as her most influential teacher. When she was twelve Shackleford learned traditional fingerweaving from Narcomey, who would also dance with her when she was little.

She attended college at the East Central University in Ada, where she majored in chemistry and minored in math. After receiving her degree Shackleford chose to pursue a different career as a weaver and took a position in the Chickasaw Nation Cultural Resources department, where she worked from 2009 until 2015. She began as a demonstrator and eventually worked herself up to the position of special projects coordinator. While working as a demonstrator Shackleford participated in stomp dance demonstrations and showcased her weaving techniques.

Shackleford has credited her husband James as encouraging her to take a different perspective, she has expanded her traditional approach to native arts to a more conceptual and contemporary craft.

== Techniques ==
Shackleford uses the technique sprang, which she used to create "The Lady". This is an ancient textile method that Native Americans have used prior to European contact to make pieces of shawl. The outcome of this technique is to create a net figure where the threads have wrapped around each other to create patterns.

Her second technique she uses is fingerweaving. This technique forms basic patterns such as diagonal, diamond, lightning, and arrowheads all while not using a loom. The purpose of fingerweaving is to mainly create belts, sashes, and straps that is a form of wearable art.

The third technique is known as twining. The spacing of the yarns between each other creates holes that can be used to contrast the negative space. The negative space creates distinct lines that can be formed into figurines or geometric patterns. The type of the fabric itself can also impact the variations of the art, making it colorful and vibrant.

Shackleford has done many other arts such as bead work and basket weaving, but prefers the three weaving techniques.

== Artworks ==
=== "The Lady" (2017) ===
This is one of Shaclkeford's most notable pieces of art where it is a ghostlike shawl standing at 9 ft. tall and 4 ft. wide. Shackleford's use of the sprang technique allowed her to create this delicate shawl without the use of a loom or any modern technology. In preserving Chickasaw culture, the title refers to the Lady of Cofitachequi who had an encounter with outside colonizers and conquistadors. Being that she was a powerful, female leader of Cofitachequi, this piece resembles the strength and resilience of all Chickasaw women. This piece is now permanently being held at the Eiteljorg Museum of the American Indians and Western Art for all to see.

=== "Twin Turkey" (2018) ===
This is a twin turkey design that is made by using the sprang weaving technique. This is mainly used for clothing but Shackleford has taken this art with a different approach towards contemporary art. In this piece, there is an image of two turkeys and a cedar tree. The cedar tree is at the center of the art and it is from an ancient shell carving during the Mississippian era. The cedar tree in the middle between the two turkeys represents the three worlds. It stretches to the upperworld represented by the sky and down to the underworld represented by the water beneath. The sky and the water is connected to our world which are represented by the two turkeys.

=== "Oshiitiik" (2017) ===
Shackleford began making this bag with a rose in the center when she was expecting a newborn daughter, Zora Rose. The title of this piece, "Oshiitiik", actually means the daughter in the Chickasaw language which will be given to Zora Rose after her first birthday. This was made through two traditional Chickasaw techniques known as twining and fingerweaving. Specifically, she used the twining technique to make the bag itself while having finger woven the strap.

== Exhibitions ==
=== Group exhibitions ===
- Chickasaw Visitor Center, Oklahoma (March - July 2015)
- Visual Voices: Contemporary Chickasaw Art, The Museum of Contemporary Native Arts, Santa Fe, Santa Fe, New Mexico, USA (Aug. 2019 - Jan. 2020)
- University of North Carolina Museum of the Southeast American Indian, Pembroke, North Carolina (March - July 2020)
- The Heard Museum Indian Fair & Market, Phoenix, Arizona (March 2020)
- Briscoe Western Art Museum, San Antonio, Texas (Sept. 2020 - Jan. 2021)

== Collections ==
Shackleford's art is held in the permanent collections of the following:

- Eiteljorg Museum of American Indians and Western Art
- Santa Fe Indian Market (New Mexico)
- Smithsonian National Museum of the American Indian (Washington, D.C.)

== Honors and awards ==
- Harrison Eiteljorg Purchase Award for a finger-woven shawl titled The Lady
- First Place and Best of Division at the Southwest Association of Indian Art (SWAIA) for "sprang" manufactured shawl
