= Tyra (stream) =

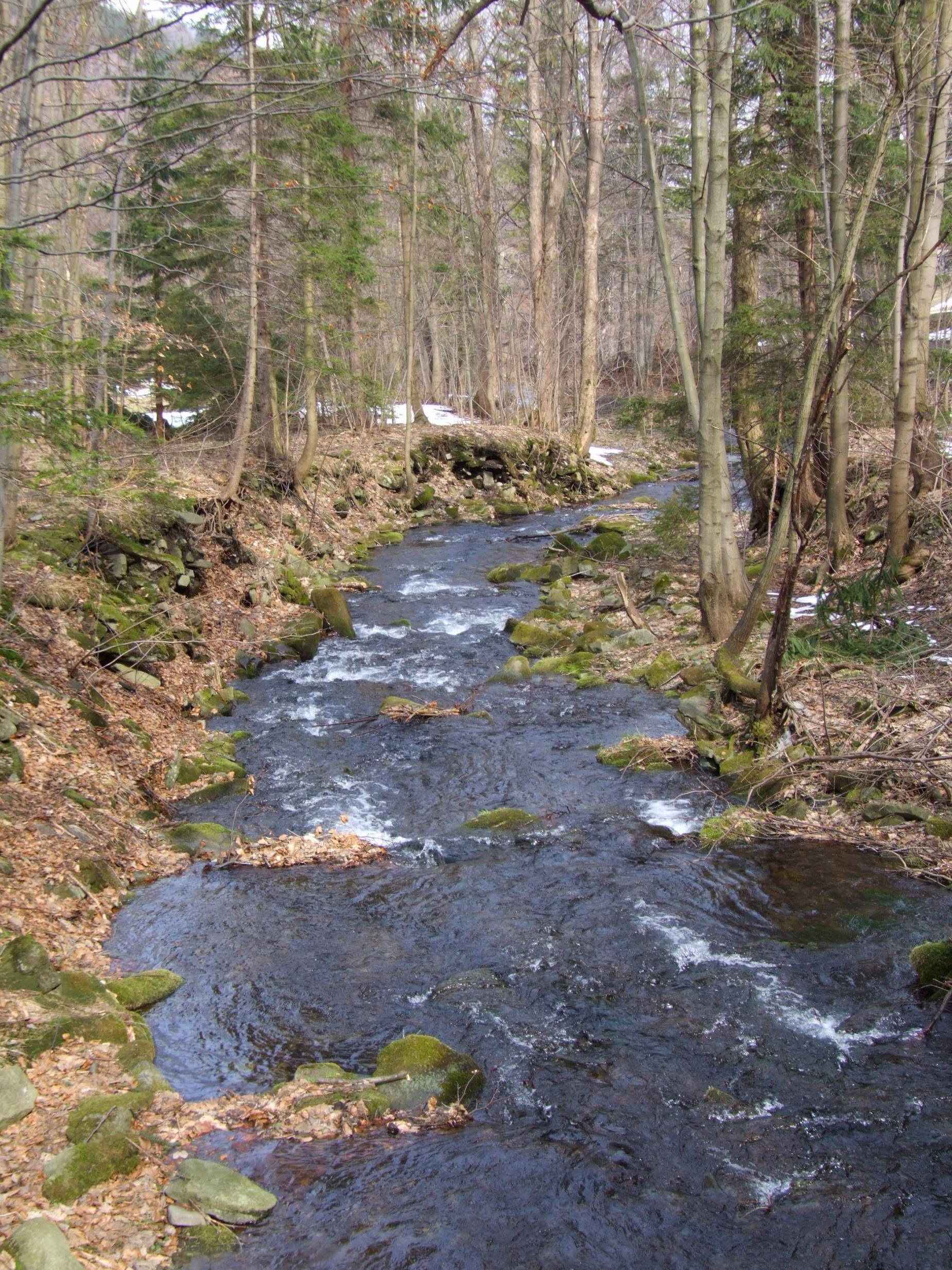
- The Tyra in Třinec-Tyra

Location
- Country: Czech Republic
- Region: Moravian-Silesian

Physical characteristics
- Source
  - location: Moravian-Silesian Beskids
  - coordinates: 49°34′46″N 18°37′49″E
  - elevation: 897 m (2,943 ft)
- Mouth
  - location: Olza
  - coordinates: 49°40′59″N 18°39′23″E
  - elevation: 298 m (978 ft)
- Length: 13.0 km (8.1 mi)
- Basin size: 31 km^{2} (12 sq mi)
- Discharge
  - average: 0.65 m^{3}/s (23 cu ft/s) near estuary

Basin features
- Progression: Olza→ Oder→ Baltic Sea

The Tyra (also called Tyrka) is a stream in the Czech Republic, a left tributary of the Olza River. It flows through Třinec in the Moravian-Silesian Region. It is 13.0 km (8.1 mi) long.

== Name ==
The stream was originally officially named Tyrka (diminutive of Tyra), but during the era of Austria-Hungary it was mistakenly labeled as Tyra by an Austrian soldier, and has retained that name ever since. Locals call the stream only Tyrka, but efforts to officially rename it back to Tyrka were abandoned in 2023 due to the costs it would entail.

== Characteristic ==
The Tyra flows exclusively through the municipal territory of Třinec. It originates in the woods in Třinec-Tyra in the Moravian-Silesian Beskids at an elevation of 897 m (2,943 ft) and flows north through Třinec-Oldřichovice to the centre of Třinec, where it enters the Olza River in the area of Třinec Iron and Steel Works at an elevation of 298 m (978 ft). The stream is 13.0 km (8.1 mi) long. Its drainage basin has an area of 31 km^{2} (12 sq mi).

The longest tributary of the Tyra is the 5.6 km-long stream of Oldřichovský potok. In the upper course, until its confluence with the brook of Planá dolina, the Tyra flows through a wooded valley and has a mountainous character.

== Fauna ==
The occurrence of the fish common minnow and alpine bullhead was documented in the stream.
