= Tyra (surname) =

Tyra is a surname. Notable people with the surname include:

- Charlie Tyra (1935—2006), American basketball player
- Emily Tyra (born 1987), American actress, singer and dancer
- Ralf Tyra (born 1958), German Lutheran theologian and pastor
- Thomas Tyra (1933—1995), American composer and music educator
- Vince Tyra (born 1965), American baseball player
