= Thyra (given name) =

Thyra is a female given name, variant of Tyra. Notable people with the name include:

- Thyra (c.936-958), Danish queen
- Thyra of Denmark (1853-1933), Danish daughter of Christian IX of Denmark and Louise of Hessel-Kassel
- Thyra of Denmark (1880–1945), Danish daughter of Frederick VIII of Denmark and Louise of Sweden
- Thyra Alleyne (1875-1954), second daughter of Forster Alleyne of Clifton and Barbados
- Thyra Bethell (1876-1972), New Zealand organizer
- Thyra J. Edwards (1897-1953), American journalist
- Thyra Eibe (1866-1955), Danish mathematician
- Thyra Frank (born 1952), Danish nurse
- Thyra Manicus-Hansen (1872-1906), Danish artist
- Thyra Schmidt (born 1974), German artist
- Thyra Stevenson (1944-2020), American politician
- Thyra Thomson (1916-2013), American politician
- Thyra von Westernhagen (born 1973), German forester
- Thyra Samter Winslow (1885-1961), American short story writer
