= Oldřichovice (Zlín District) =

- Municipality
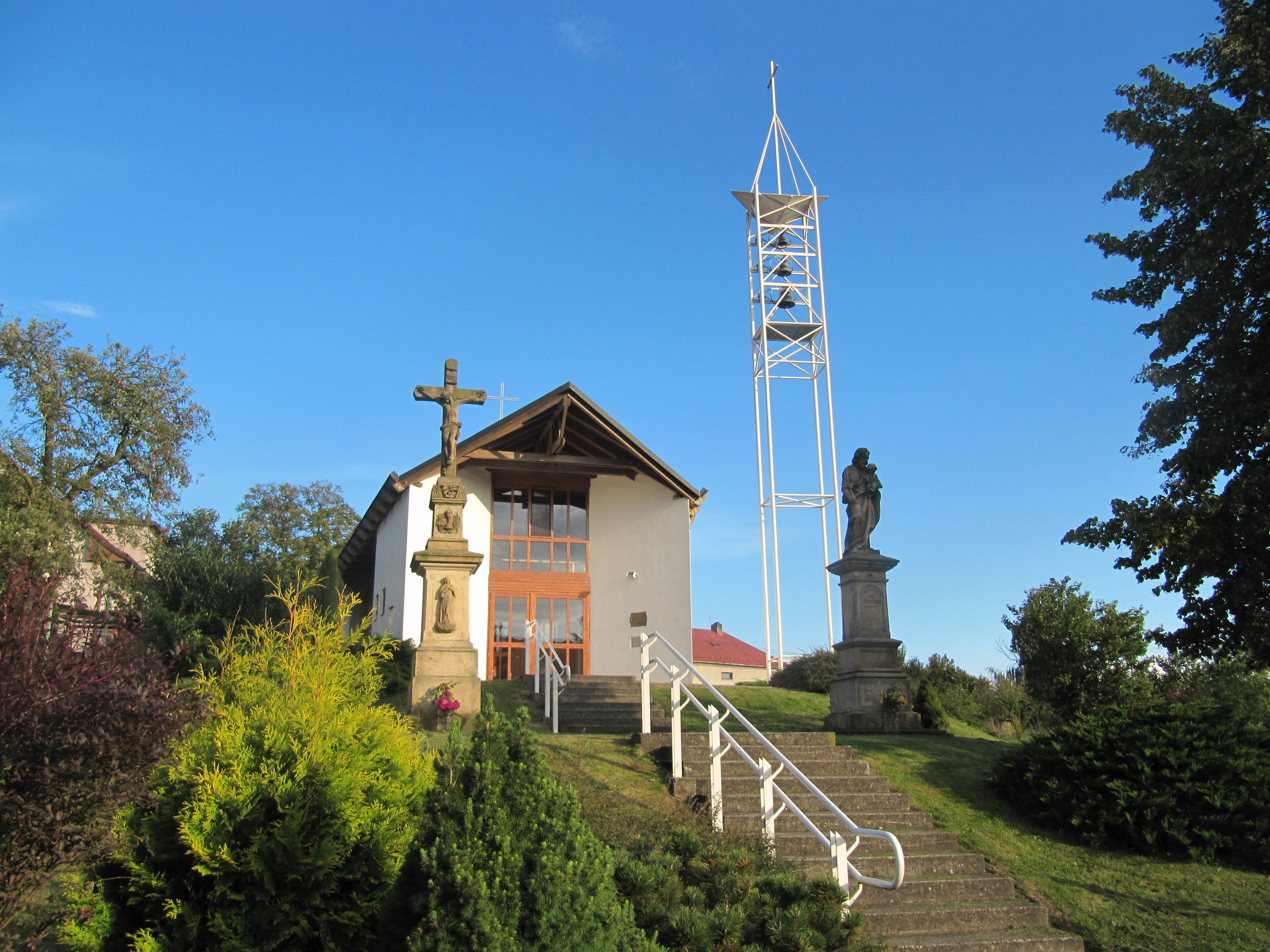
- Church of Saint Zdislava

- Flag Coat of arms

- Location in the Czech Republic
- Coordinates: 49°10′54″N 17°33′41″E
- Country: Czech Republic
- Region: Zlín
- District: Zlín
- First mentioned: 1362

Area
  - Total: 2.73 km^{2} (1.05 sq mi)
- Elevation: 270 m (890 ft)

Population (2026-01-01)
  - Total: 373
  - Density: 137/km^{2} (354/sq mi)
- Time zone: UTC+1 (CET)
  - Summer (DST): UTC+2 (CEST)
- Postal code: 763 61
- Website: www.oldrichovice.cz

Oldřichovice is a municipality and village in Zlín District in the Zlín Region of the Czech Republic. It has about 400 inhabitants.

Oldřichovice lies approximately 10 kilometres (6 mi) south-west of Zlín and 249 km (155 mi) south-east of Prague.

== Demographics ==
Historical population
Year	Pop.	±%
1869	366	—
1880	370	+1.1%
1890	385	+4.1%
1900	405	+5.2%
1910	426	+5.2%
1921	425	−0.2%
1930	390	−8.2%
1950	442	+13.3%
1961	443	+0.2%
1970	400	−9.7%
1980	356	−11.0%
1991	338	−5.1%
2001	359	+6.2%
2011	385	+7.2%
2021	382	−0.8%
Source: Censuses
