= Tyras (disambiguation) =

Tyras was an ancient Greek city on the shore of the Black Sea.

It may also refer to:

- Tyras, ancient Greek name for the Dniester River which discharges into the Black Sea
- Tyras Vallis, an ancient river valley on Mars
- Tyras S. Athey (1927–2010), American politician, Secretary of State of Maryland

== See also ==
- Zena Gunther de Tyras (c. 1922–2012), Cypriot philanthropist, socialite and supporter of Cypriot liberation from British rule, designated Princess of Tyre after being adopted by an eccentric pretender to the Byzantine throne
