= Allersee =

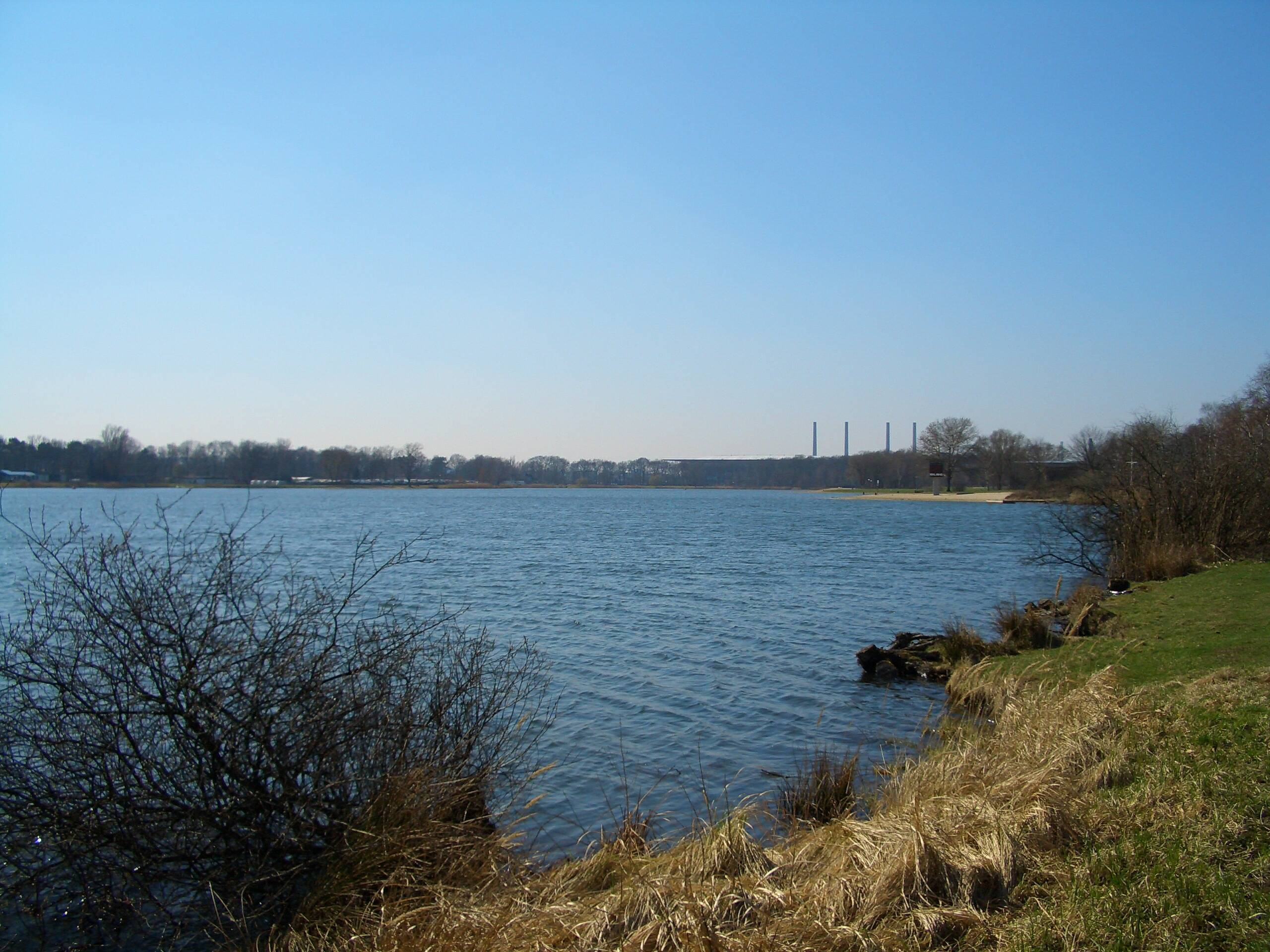

- Location within Lower Saxony
- Location: Wolfsburg, Lower Saxony
- Coordinates: 52°26′1″N 10°49′9″E
- Type: Artificial lake
- Basin countries: Germany
- Surface area: 0.29 km^{2} (0.11 sq mi)
- Surface elevation: 57 m (187 ft)

Allersee is a lake in Wolfsburg, Lower Saxony, Germany. At an elevation of 57 m, its surface area is 3.321 km^{2}.
