= Dešenice =

- Market town
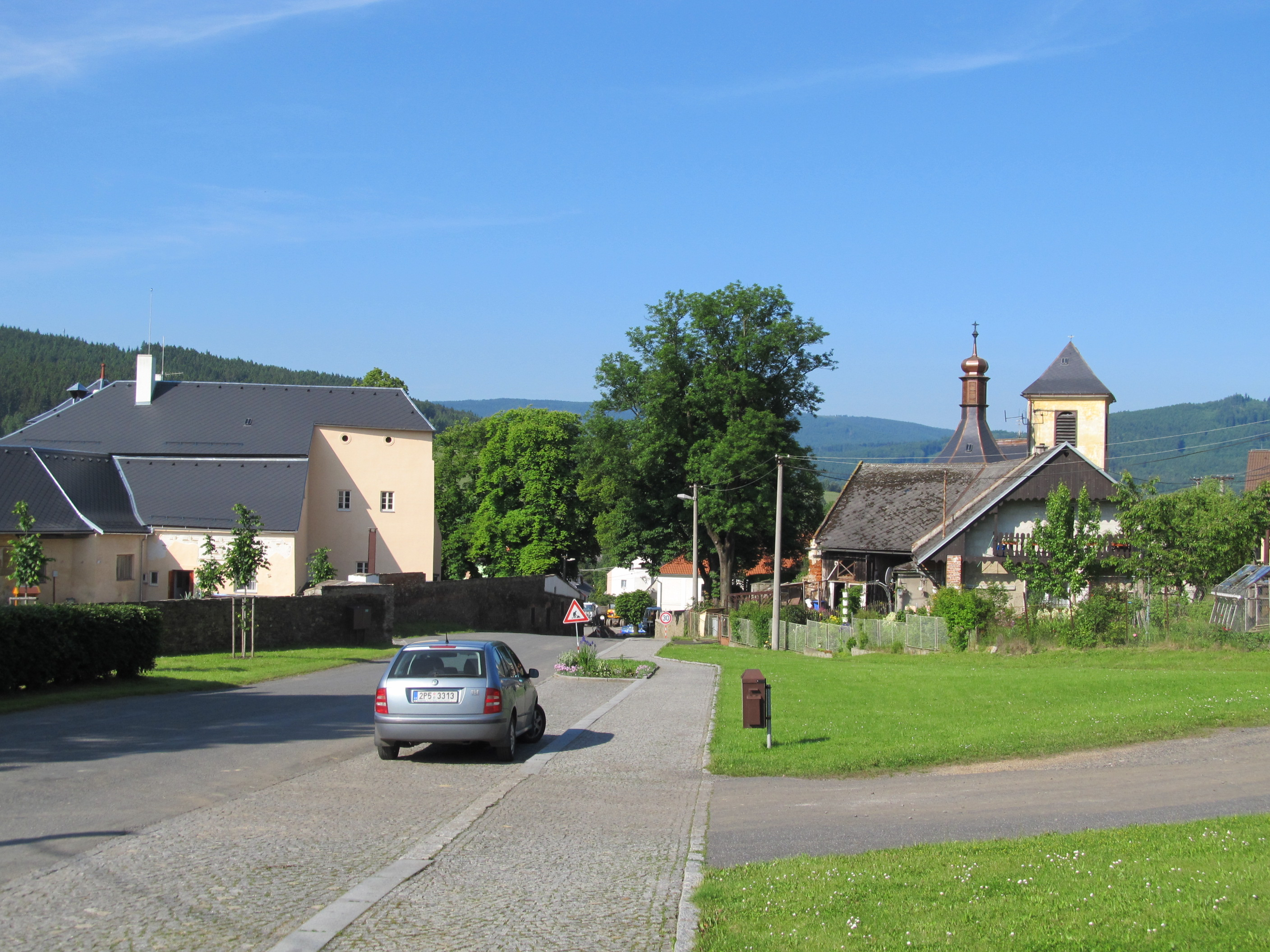
- Former fortress (left) and the Church of Saint Nicholas (right)

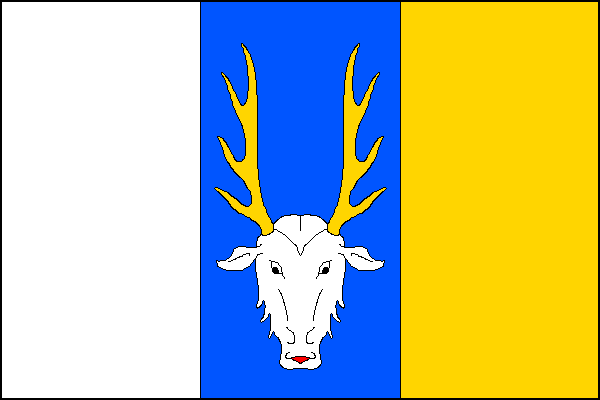
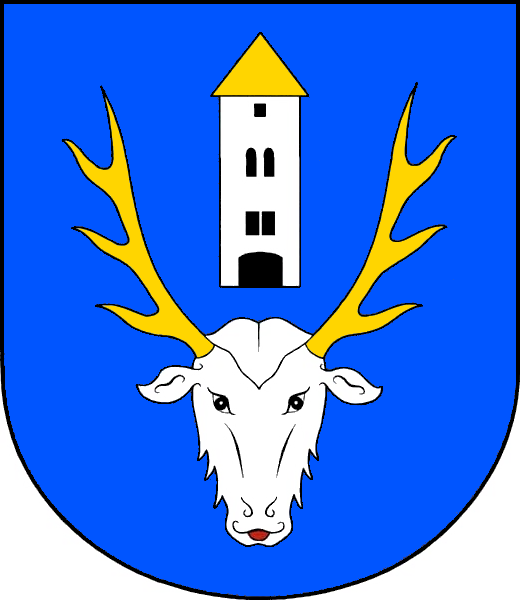
- Flag Coat of arms

- Location in the Czech Republic
- Coordinates: 49°16′27″N 13°10′17″E
- Country: Czech Republic
- Region: Plzeň
- District: Klatovy
- First mentioned: 1272

Area
  - Total: 31.38 km^{2} (12.12 sq mi)
- Elevation: 505 m (1,657 ft)

Population (2026-01-01)
  - Total: 696
  - Density: 22.2/km^{2} (57.4/sq mi)
- Time zone: UTC+1 (CET)
  - Summer (DST): UTC+2 (CEST)
- Postal codes: 340 21, 340 22
- Website: www.desenice.cz

Dešenice (Czech pronunciation: [ˈdɛʃɛɲɪtsɛ]; German: Deschenitz) is a market town in Klatovy District in the Plzeň Region of the Czech Republic. It has about 700 inhabitants.

== Administrative division ==
Dešenice consists of nine municipal parts (in brackets population according to the 2021 census):

- Dešenice (402)
- Datelov (9)
- Děpoltice (43)
- Divišovice (22)
- Matějovice (0)
- Městiště (9)
- Milence (183)
- Oldřichovice (9)
- Žiznětice (13)

== Etymology ==
The initial name of the village was probably Deščnice. That would mean that the name was derived from the old Czech adjective deščná (meaning 'forested'), which referred to some hill.

== Geography ==
Dešenice is located about 16 kilometres (10 mi) southwest of Klatovy and 53 km (33 mi) south of Plzeň. Most of the municipal territory lies in the Bohemian Forest, but the northern part with the market town proper lies in the Bohemian Forest Foothills. The highest point is on the slopes of the mountain Prenet at 1,037 m (3,402 ft) above sea level. The municipal territory is rich in streams; the most notable of them is Jelenka.

A small part of the Nýrsko Reservoir is located in the municipal territory. It was built in 1964–1969 and has a 36 m (118 ft) high stone dam. It serves as a source of drinking water for the region.

== History ==
The first written mention of Dešenice is from 1272. Until 1686, the village was owned by various lower noblemen. In 1686–1757, Dešenice was a property of the Krakovský of Kolowrat family (a branch of the Kolowrat family). They had rebuilt the local fortress. The next owners of the estate were the Counts of Palm-Gundelfingen. In 1839, Dešenice was bought by Counts of Hohenzollern-Sigmaringen. In 1903, Dešenice was promoted to a market town.

== Demographics ==
Historical population

Year	Pop.	±%
1869	2,297	—
1880	2,472	+7.6%
1890	2,413	−2.4%
1900	2,429	+0.7%
1910	2,435	+0.2%

Year	Pop.	±%
1921	2,412	−0.9%
1930	2,415	+0.1%
1950	1,050	−56.5%
1961	1,033	−1.6%
1970	947	−8.3%

Year	Pop.	±%
1980	799	−15.6%
1991	746	−6.6%
2001	712	−4.6%
2011	659	−7.4%
2021	690	+4.7%

Source: Censuses

== Transport ==
Dešenice is located on the main railway line Prague–Železná Ruda.

== Sights ==
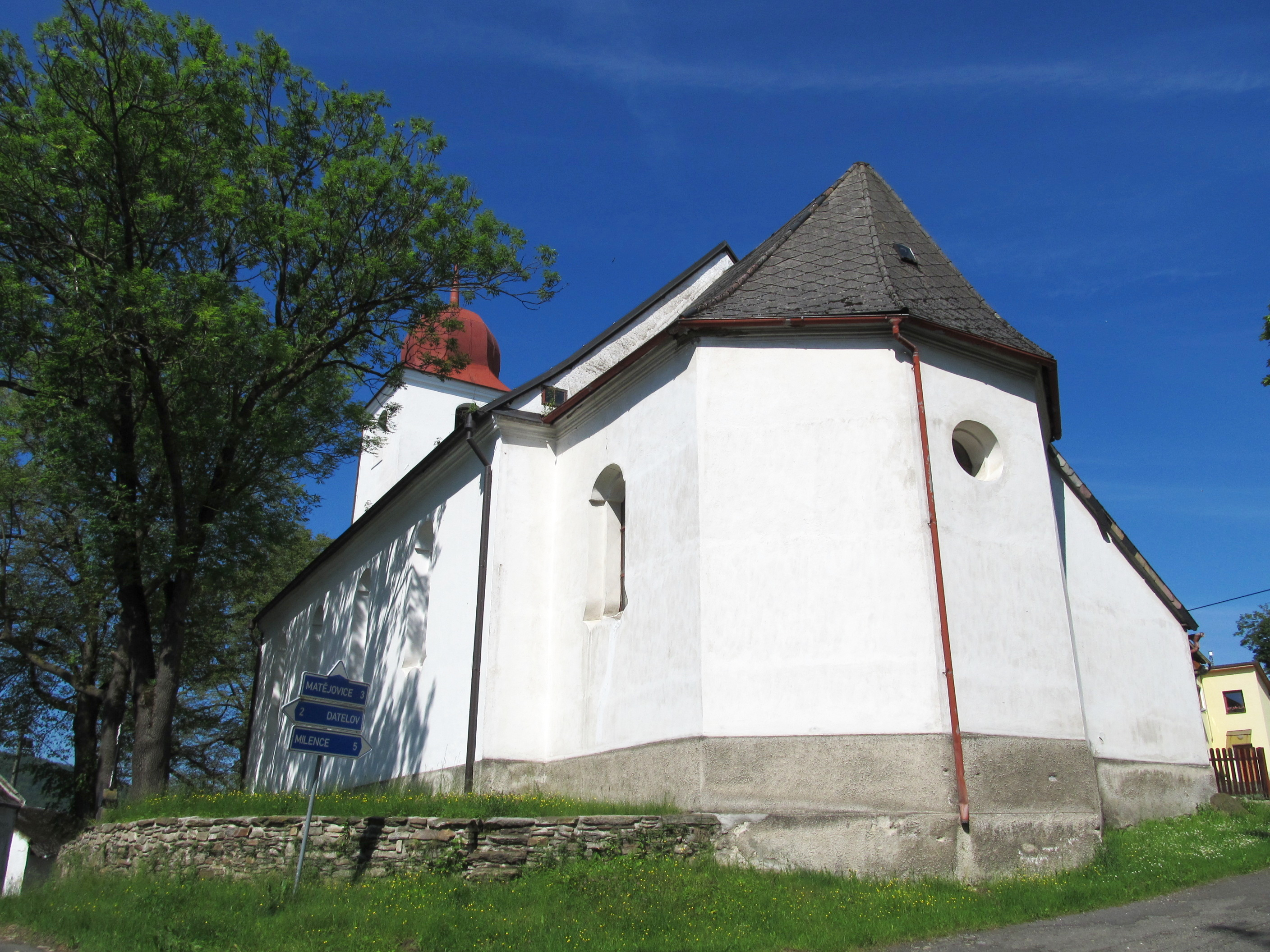
Church of Saint Isidore

The Church of Saint Nicholas was built in the third quarter of the 13th century. The Gothic church was extended in the Baroque style in the first half of the 18th century.

The original Gothic fortress went through a complicated construction development and was gradually modified in the Renaissance and Baroque styles in 1560 and in the 17th and 18th centuries. In the second half of the 19th century, it was rebuilt into a brewery. Today the building houses the Museum of Šumava Beer Brewing.

The Church of Saint Isidore is located in Děpoltice. It was built in the late Baroque style in 1805.
