= Oldřichovice (Třinec) =

Coordinates: 49°39′5″N 18°39′3″E

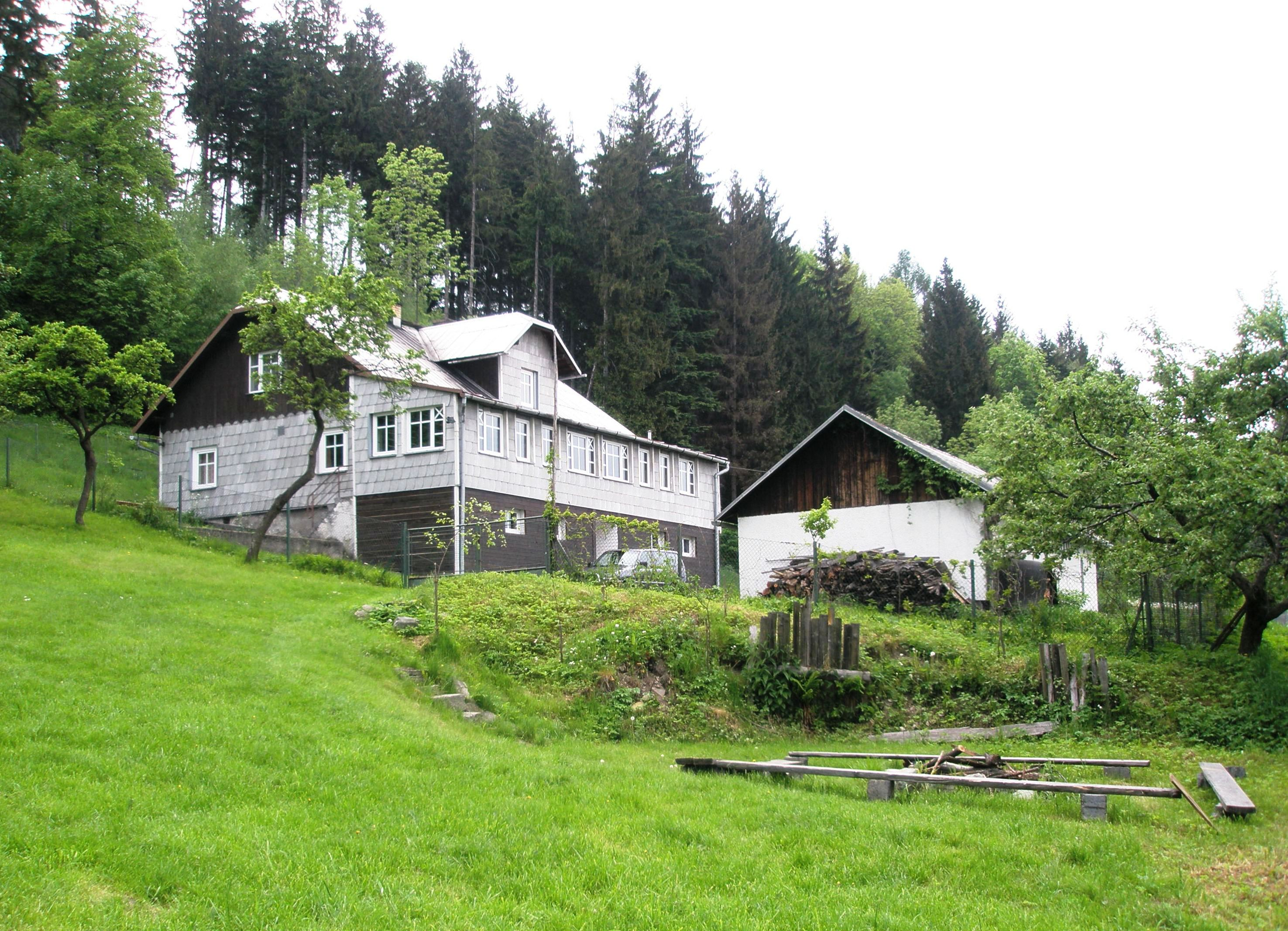
Cottage of the Lutheran church in the village

Oldřichovice (Polish: Oldrzychowice, German: Oldrzichowitz) is a village in Frýdek-Místek District, Moravian-Silesian Region, Czech Republic. It was a separate municipality but became administratively a part of Třinec in 1980. It has a population of 3,182 (1 January 2008). and lies in the historical region of Cieszyn Silesia. Tyrka flows through the village.

The name of the village is of patronymic origins derived from personal name Oldrzych, from German name Ulrich.

== History ==
The settlement was first mentioned in a Latin document of Diocese of Wrocław called Liber fundationis episcopatus Vratislaviensis from around 1305 as item in Ulrici villa. It meant that the village was in the process of location (the size of land to pay a tithe from was not yet precised). The creation of the village was a part of a larger settlement campaign taking place in the late 13th century on the territory of what will be later known as Upper Silesia.

Politically the village belonged initially to the Duchy of Teschen, formed in 1290 in the process of feudal fragmentation of Poland and was ruled by a local branch of Piast dynasty. In 1327 the duchy became a fee of the Kingdom of Bohemia, which after 1526 became part of the Habsburg monarchy.

After Revolutions of 1848 in the Austrian Empire a modern municipal division was introduced in the re-established Austrian Silesia. The village as a municipality was subscribed to the political district of Teschen and the legal district of Jablunkau. According to the censuses conducted in 1880, 1890, 1900 and 1910 the population of the municipality grew from 1,574 in 1880 to 2,009 in 1910 with a majority being native Polish-speakers (growing from 98.7% in 1880 to 98.8% in 1900 then dropping to 96.1% in 1910) accompanied by German-speaking (at most 57 or 2.8% in 1910) and Czech-speaking people (at most 21 or 1.1% in 1910). In terms of religion in 1910 the majority were Protestants (87.8%), followed by Roman Catholics (11.3%) and Jews (19 or 0.9%). The village was also traditionally inhabited by Cieszyn Vlachs, speaking Cieszyn Silesian dialect.

After World War I, fall of Austria-Hungary, Polish–Czechoslovak War and the division of Cieszyn Silesia in 1920, it became a part of Czechoslovakia. Following the Munich Agreement, in October 1938 together with the Zaolzie region it was annexed by Poland, administratively adjoined to Cieszyn County of Silesian Voivodeship. It was then annexed by Nazi Germany at the beginning of World War II. After the war it was restored to Czechoslovakia.

== People ==
- Henryk Jasiczek - Polish poet, spent his childhood here

== See also ==
- Polish minority in the Czech Republic
- Zaolzie
