= Tyra Wolfsberg =

American bioinformatician

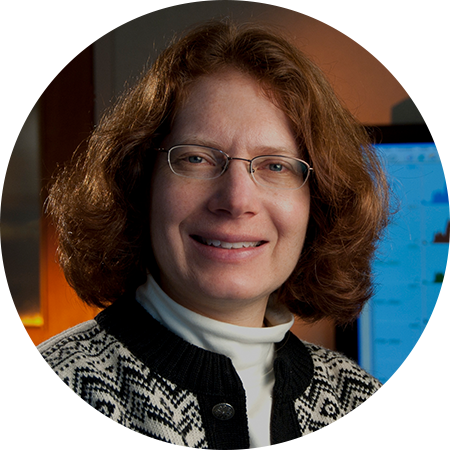
- Education: Princeton University; University of California, San Francisco
- Scientific career
- Fields: Bioinformatics
- Workplaces: National Institutes of Health

Tyra Gwendolen Wolfsberg is an American bioinformatician. She is the associate director of the bioinformatics and scientific programming core at the National Human Genome Research Institute.

== Life ==
Wolfsberg received a A.B. in molecular biology from Princeton University. She earned a Ph.D. in biochemistry and biophysics from the University of California, San Francisco. Her 1995 dissertation was titled Identification and characterization of ADAM, a novel gene family. Wolfsberg transitioned to computationally based research by performing a postdoctoral fellowship at the National Center for Biotechnology Information (NCBI) at NIH. She worked as a staff scientist at NCBI before joining the National Human Genome Research Institute (NHGRI) faculty in 2000.

Wolfsberg is the associate director of NHGRI's bioinformatics and scientific programming core. Her research program focuses on developing methodologies to integrate sequence, annotation, and experimentally generated data so that bench biologists can quickly and easily obtain results for their large-scale experiments. She has collaborated with NHGRI investigators on a variety of projects, from genomic characterizations of DNAse I hypersensitive sites and retroviral integration sites to the annotation of the genome of the ctenophore Mnemiopsis leidyi. Her analysis of the Mnemiopsis genome helped to demonstrate that ctenophores are the oldest animal relatives of humans.
