= Gmyrdek =

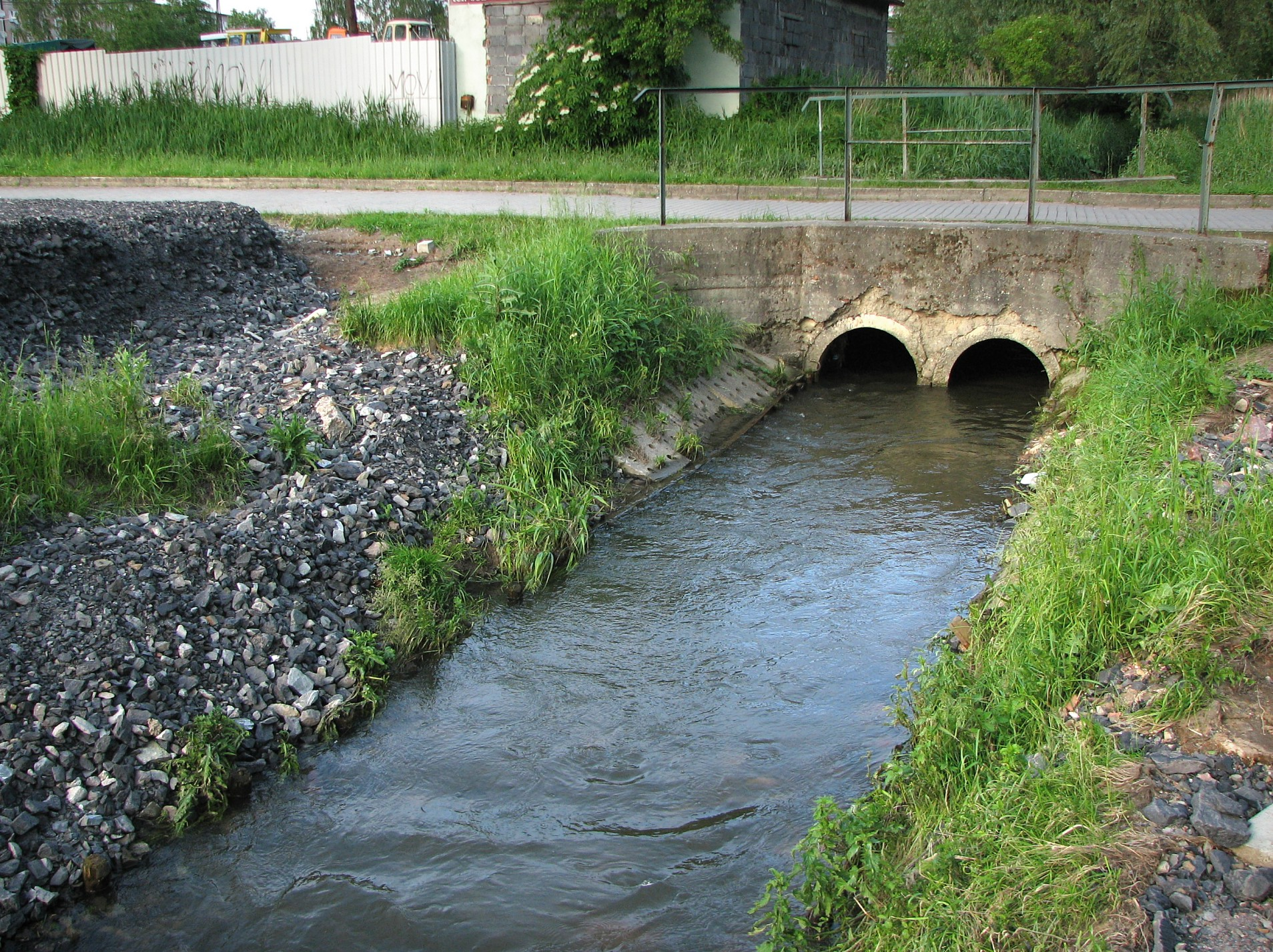

Location
- Country: Poland
- Voivodeship: Silesian
- City county: Jastrzębie-Zdrój

Physical characteristics
- Source
  - location: southeastern Jastrzębie Górne i Dolne district, Jastrzębie-Zdrój
  - coordinates: 49°57′38.0″N 18°38′04.0″E
- Mouth: Ruptawka
  - location: south of Tuwima district, Jastrzębie-Zdrój
  - coordinates: 49°56′14″N 18°35′19″E
  - elevation: 230 m (750 ft)
- Length: 4.99 km (3.10 mi)
- Basin size: 8.5 km^{2} (3.3 mi^{2})

Basin features
- Progression: Ruptawka→ Szotkówka→ Olza→ Oder→ Baltic Sea

Gmyrdek is a river of Poland, a tributary of the river Ruptawka near Jastrzębie-Zdrój.
