= Kolejówka =

River in Poland

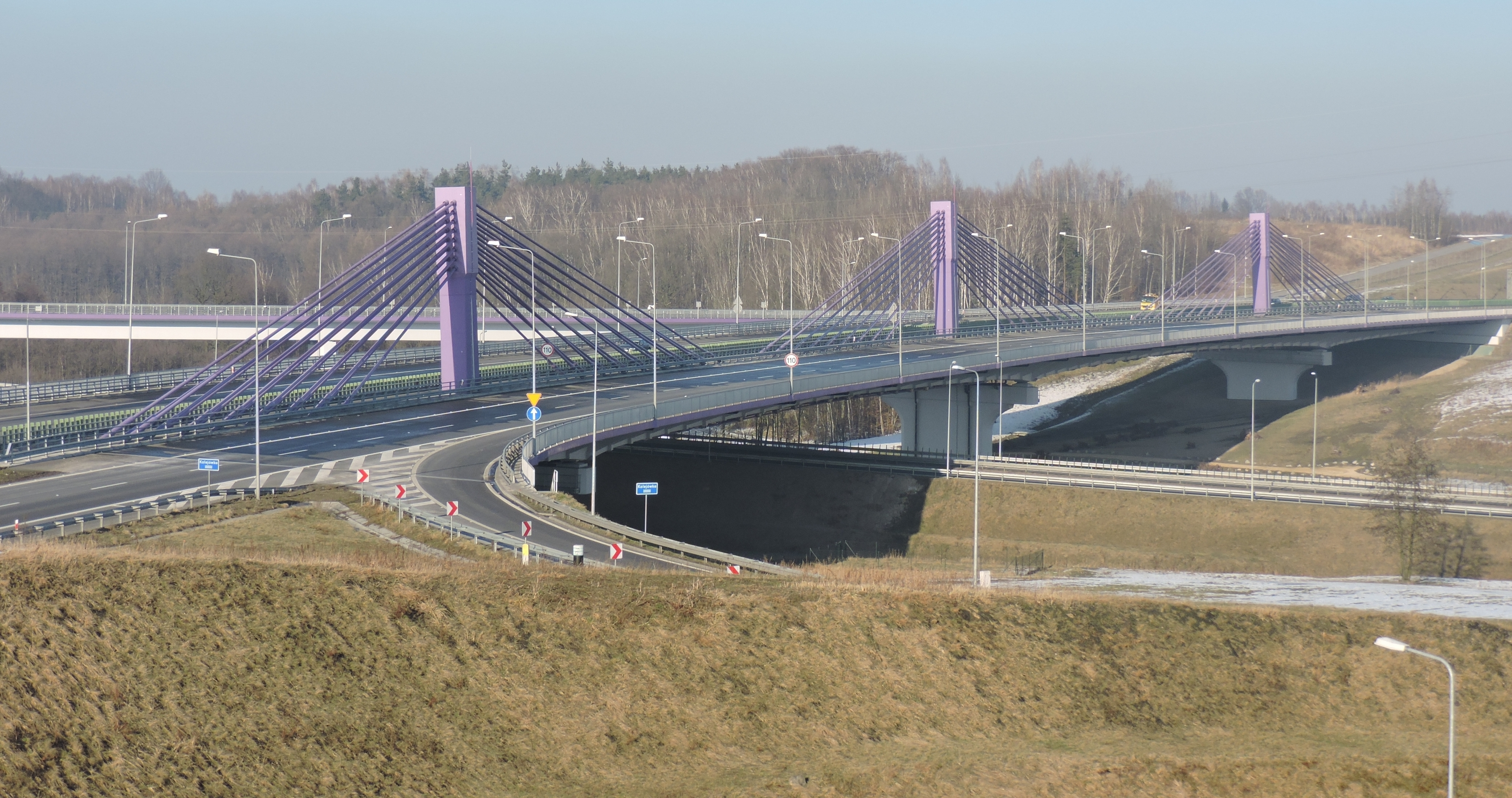

Location
- Country: Poland

Physical characteristics
- Mouth
  - location: Szotkówka
  - coordinates: 49.9689°N 18.5535°E

Basin features
- Progression: Szotkówka→ Olza→ Oder→ Baltic Sea

Kolejówka is a river of Poland, a tributary of the Szotkówka near Mszana. It spans 4.86 km and has a catchment area of 6.93 km^{2}.

The source of the river is located in Wodzisław Śląski in the Wilchwy district. It goes through Połomia and Mszana. A bridge over the A1 motorway in Mszana was built over the Kolejówka valley. In the final section, it forms the border between Połomia and Mszana.
