= Aniela Kupiec =

Polish poet from the Czech Republic (1920–2019)

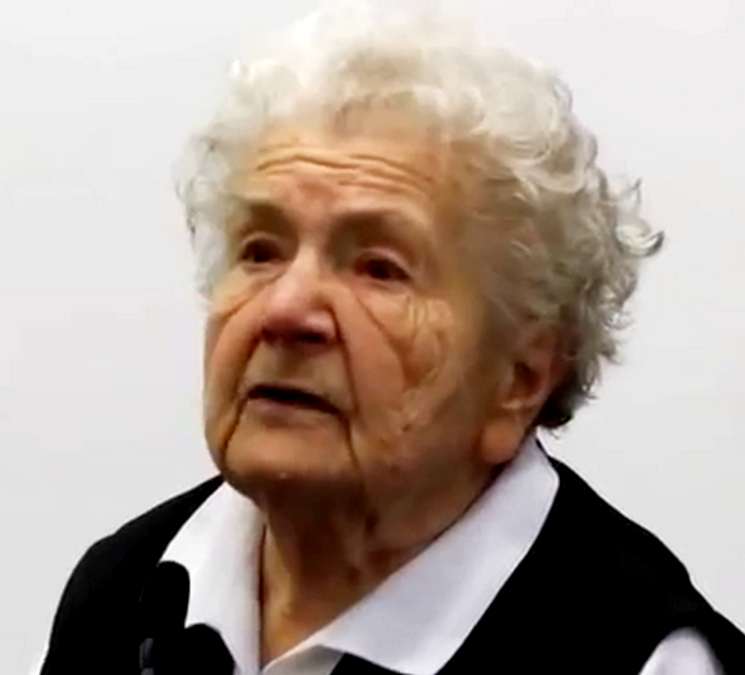
- Born: Aniela Milerska; 5 April 1920; Nýdek, Cieszyn Silesia
- Died: 11 September 2019 (aged 99); Nýdek, Czech Republic
- Occupation: Poet
- Spouse: Jan Kupiec
- Writing career
- Language: Cieszyn Silesian dialect

Aniela Kupiec (5 April 1920 – 11 September 2019) was a Polish Czech poet and public figure from the Trans-Olza region. She wrote her poetry in the Cieszyn Silesian dialect.

== Life ==
Kupiec was born in Nýdek on 5 April 1920 in Cieszyn Silesia. Her Milerski family could trace their heritage to the 17th century. Three months after she was born, the region of Cieszyn Silesia where she had been born, was divided between Poland and Czechoslovakia as a result of the Spa Conference. The village of Nýdek where her family lived found itself on the Czech side of the border.

She was a keen reader being remembered for caring for a cow with a book in her hand. She met her future husband, Jan Kupiec, in Polish organisations in her youth. During the occupation by Nazi Germany she had to manually work hard in a forest. This was an unwelcome change from the office work she did briefly in the Třinec Iron and Steel Works before the war cost her that job. After the war in 1945 she married Jan Kupiec. Trans-Olza became again a part of Czechoslovakia. After the 1948 communist coup she and her husband were not trusted citizens. Eventually however her husband became the headmaster of a Polish primary school.

In the 1950s she was involved in folk activities of the Polish Cultural and Educational Union, and in meteorology where she recorded weather data. She was always writing poems but she did not regard herself as a poet, and it was not until 1981 that her first book of poetry was published. A second followed the next year. The main literary languages used in Cieszyn Silesia are Czech and Polish. However, several writers and poets wrote in the Cieszyn Silesian dialect, including Paweł Kubisz, Władysław Młynek and Kupiec. Poets who wrote in Cieszyn Silesian generally regarded their work as part of the Polish literary tradition, rather than belonging to a new literary language.

She began to publish her own short stories and other prose in 1997. Her humour was appreciated. In 2005 she published another book which included both poetry and prose.

She died in 2019 in the simple wooden home she had lived in her whole life.

== Publications ==
- Korzenie (1987) – a collection of poems written in the Cieszyn Silesian dialect together with Ewa Milerska and Anna Filipek
- Malinowy świat (1988)
- Połotane żywobyci (1997)
- Po naszymu pieszo i na skrzydłach (2005)
