= Józef Chlebowczyk =

Polish historian

Józef Chlebowczyk (19 January 1924 – 14 August 1985) was a Polish historian.

== Biography ==
Chlebowczyk was born in Karviná as a son of Augustyn Chlebowczyk, local administrative worker. He graduated from Juliusz Słowacki Polish Grammar School in Orlová and later from the Main School of Planning and Statistics in Warsaw. In 1961 he gained a Ph.D. In 1966 he passed his habilitation. In 1977 Chlebowczyk gained the title of professor. Since 1968 he worked in Silesian Institute in Katowice and lectured at the Silesian University.

He focused on the history of Cieszyn Silesia and nationalist movements in Central Europe.

He died on 14 August 1985 in Sozopol, at the age of 61. He was considered as an outstanding Polish historian.

== Works ==
- Główne problemy i etapy stosunków polsko-czeskich na Śląsku Cieszyńskim w XIX i na początku XX wieku (do r. 1914) (1961)
- Wybory do organów przedstawicielskich na Śląsku Cieszyńskim w 1848 r.: przyczynek do badań nad kształtowaniem się świadomości i aktywności społecznej w okresie kapitalizmu (1964)
- Wybory i świadomość społeczna na Śląsku Cieszyńskim w drugiej połowie XIX w. (1966)
- Nad Olzą (Śląsk Cieszyński w wiekach XVIII, XIX i XX) (1971)
- Karol Śliwka - i jego towarzysze walki (1972)
- Procesy narodotwórcze we wschodniej Europie Środkowej w dobie kapitalizmu (1975)
- Między dyktatem, realiami a prawem do samostanowienia: prawo do samookreślenia i problem granic we wschodniej Europie Środkowej w pierwszej wojnie światowej oraz po jej zakończeniu (1988)
