= Bystřice (Frýdek-Místek District) =

Bystřice Bystrzyca
- Municipality
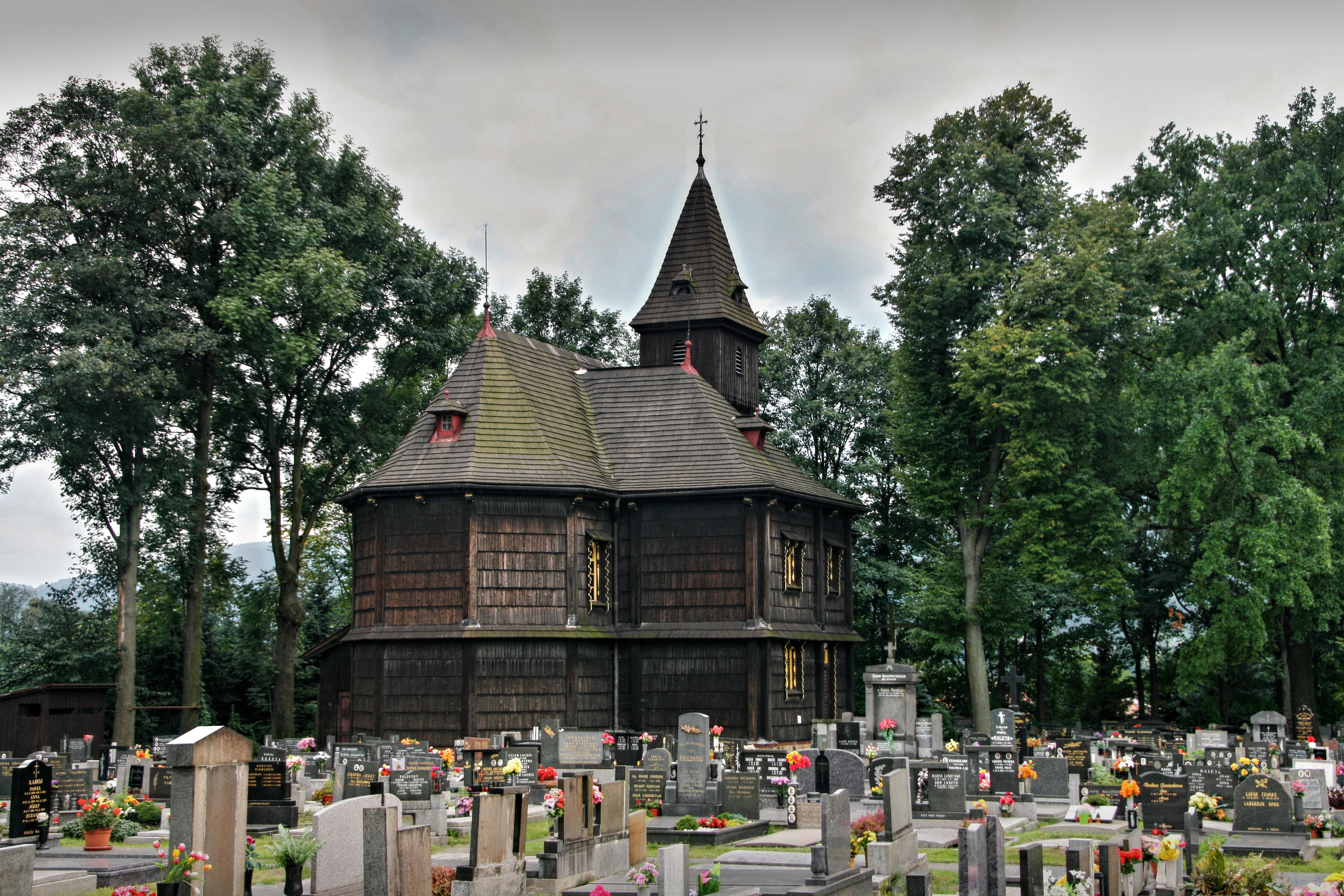
- Church of the Exaltation of the Holy Cross

- Flag Coat of arms

- Location in the Czech Republic
- Coordinates: 49°38′8″N 18°43′51″E
- Country: Czech Republic
- Region: Moravian-Silesian
- District: Frýdek-Místek
- First mentioned: 1423

Area
  - Total: 16.09 km^{2} (6.21 sq mi)
- Elevation: 340 m (1,120 ft)

Population (2026-01-01)
  - Total: 5,262
  - Density: 327.0/km^{2} (847.0/sq mi)
- Time zone: UTC+1 (CET)
  - Summer (DST): UTC+2 (CEST)
- Postal code: 739 95
- Website: www.bystrice.cz

Bystřice (Czech pronunciation: [ˈbɪstr̝̊ɪtsɛ]; Polish: Bystrzyca, German: Bistrzitz) is a municipality and village in Frýdek-Místek District in the Moravian-Silesian Region of the Czech Republic. It has about 5,300 inhabitants, making it one of the most populous Czech municipalities without the town status. The municipality has a significant Polish minority. Bystřice is located at the confluence of the Olza River and the Hluchová Stream.

== Etymology ==
The name is derived from the Slavic word bystry, bystrý, i.e. 'fast', 'rapid' (flow of a river or stream).

== Geography ==
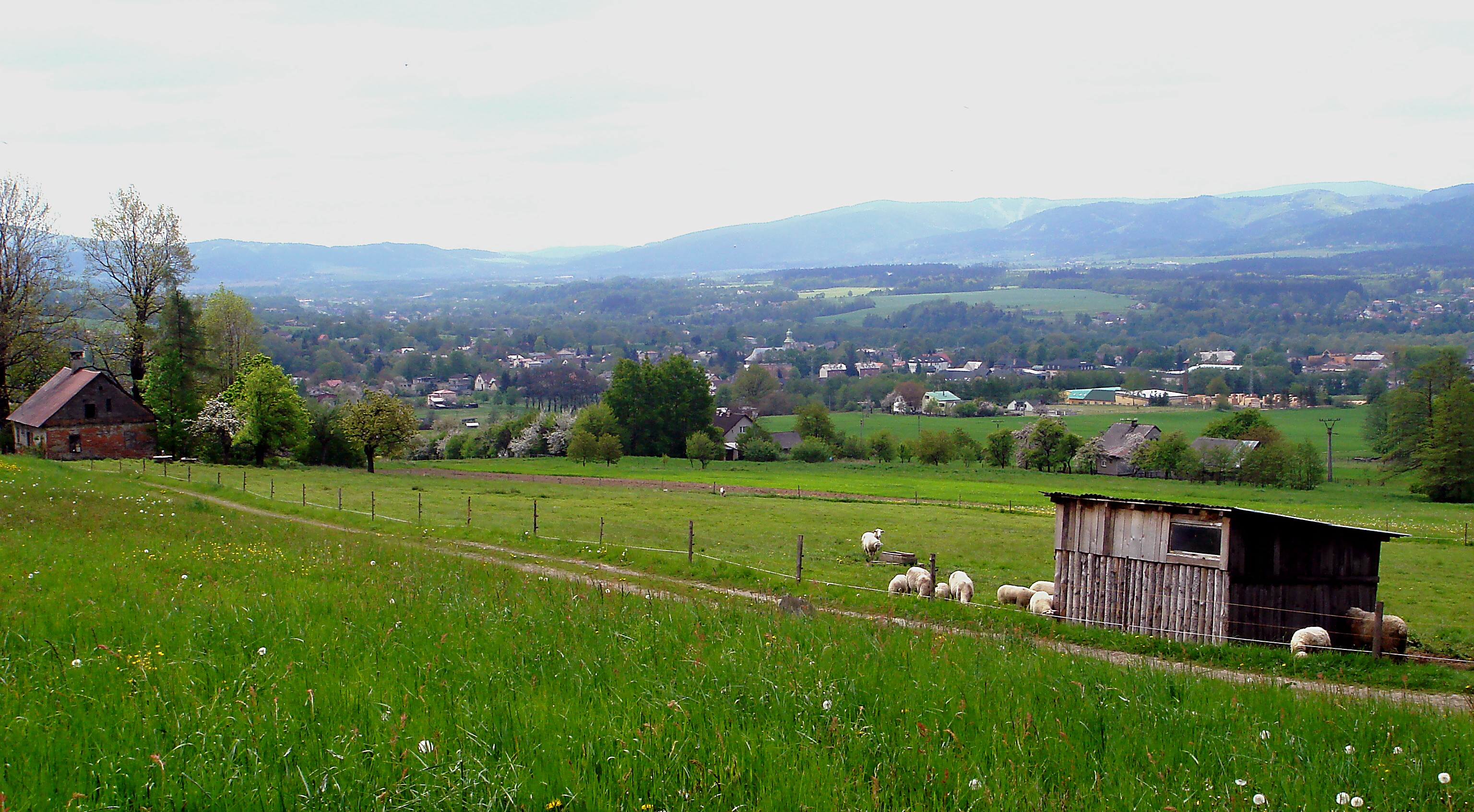
View from the north

Bystřice is located about 26 kilometres (16 mi) east of Frýdek-Místek and 36 km (22 mi) southeast of Ostrava, in the historical region of Cieszyn Silesia. The southwestern part of the municipality lies in the Jablunkov Furrow and the southeastern part in the Silesian Beskids. In the north the territory extends into the Moravian-Silesian Foothills. The highest point is near the peak of Loučka, at 830 m (2,720 ft) above sea level. The Hluchová Stream flows to the Olza River in the municipality.

== History ==
Bystřice was probably founded at the turn of the 14th and 15th centuries. The first written mention of Bystřice is in a deed of Bolesław I, Duke of Cieszyn from 1423. Politically it belonged to the Duchy of Teschen. By the end of the 15th century, the first stage of colonisation took place. Forests were cut down, fields established, and cattle breeding and pastoralism began.

After the 1540s Reformation prevailed in the Duchy of Teschen and a local Catholic church was taken over by Lutherans. Local Protestants built there a wooden church in 1587. It was taken from them (as one from around fifty buildings) in the region by a special commission and given back to the Roman Catholic Church on 21 March 1654. In spite of being bereft of place of worship many of the local inhabitants remained to be Lutherans. After issuing the Patent of Toleration in 1781 they subsequently organised a local Lutheran parish as one of over ten in the region.

Settlers have lived mainly off farming and pastures. After the construction of Třinec Iron and Steel Works in 1839, some of villagers went to work there.

After Revolutions of 1848 in the Austrian Empire a modern municipal division was introduced in the re-established Austrian Silesia. The village as a municipality was subscribed to the political district of Cieszyn and the legal district of Jablunkov. According to the censuses conducted in 1880–1910 the population of the municipality grew from 1,933 in 1880 to 2,442 in 1910 with the majority being native Polish-speakers (between 98.2% and 98.9%) accompanied by German-speaking (at most 1.7% in 1900) and Czech-speaking people (at most 0.5% in 1910). In terms of religion in 1910 the majority were Protestants (88.2%), followed by Roman Catholics (10.9%) and Jews (0.9%).

After World War I, Polish–Czechoslovak War and the division of Cieszyn Silesia in 1920, it became a part of Czechoslovakia. Following the Munich Agreement, in October 1938 together with the Trans-Olza region it was annexed by Poland, administratively adjoined to Cieszyn County of Silesian Voivodeship. It was then annexed by Nazi Germany at the beginning of World War II. After the war it was restored to Czechoslovakia.

== Demographics ==
According to the 2021 Census, Polish minority makes up 21.3% of the population.

Historical population

Year	Pop.	±%
1869	1,745	—
1880	1,933	+10.8%
1890	2,009	+3.9%
1900	2,243	+11.6%
1910	2,442	+8.9%

Year	Pop.	±%
1921	2,668	+9.3%
1930	3,552	+33.1%
1950	3,794	+6.8%
1961	4,250	+12.0%
1970	4,403	+3.6%

Year	Pop.	±%
1980	4,795	+8.9%
1991	4,859	+1.3%
2001	4,991	+2.7%
2011	5,197	+4.1%
2021	5,175	−0.4%

Source: Censuses

== Transport ==
The I/68 road (part of the European route E75), which connects the D48 motorway with the Czech–Slovak border in Mosty u Jablunkova, runs through the municipality.

Bystřice is located on the railway lines Prague/Ostrava–Návsí/Mosty u Jablunkova.

== Sights ==
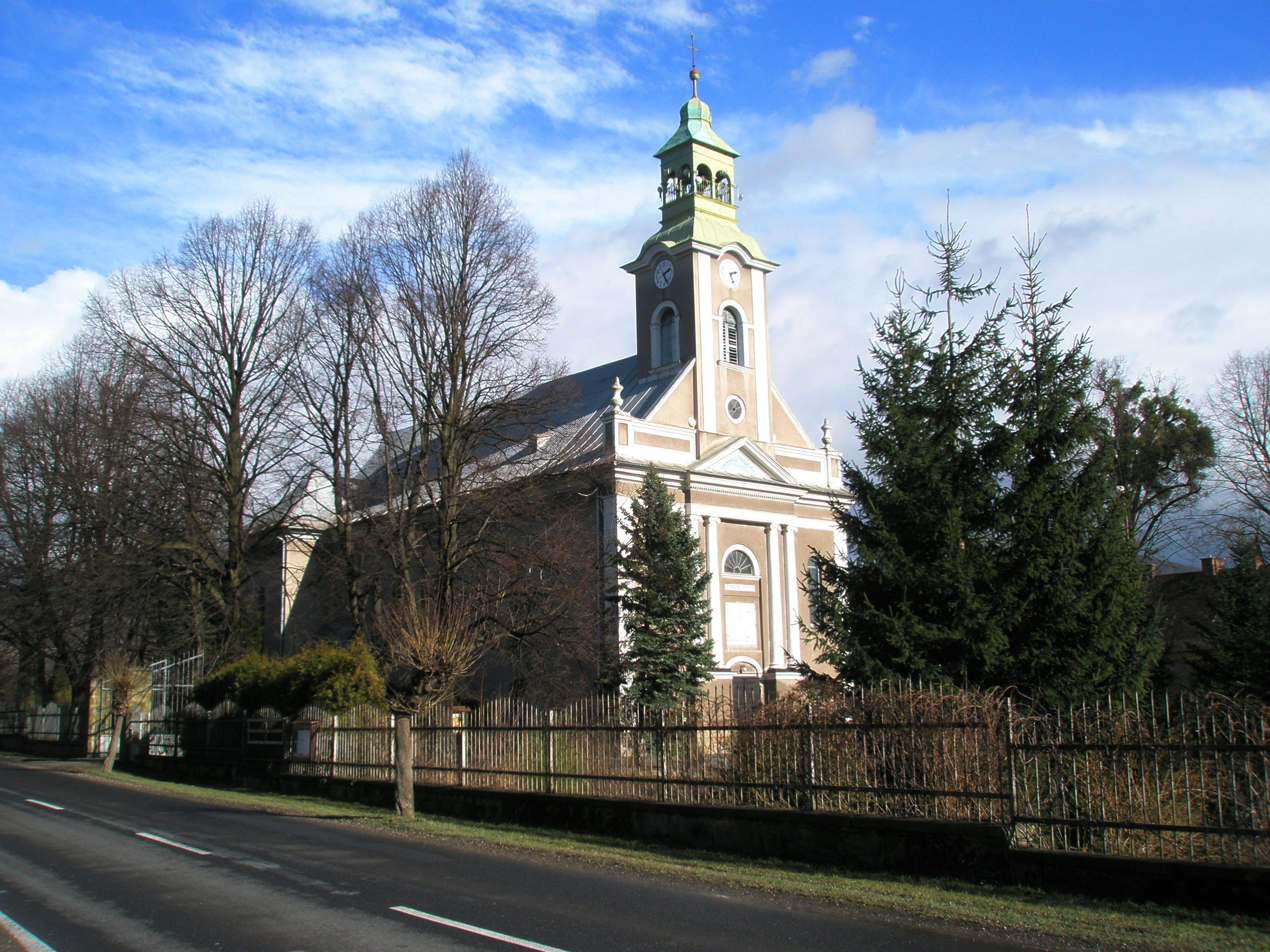
Lutheran church

There are two historic landmarks in Bystřice. The Lutheran church was built in 1811. The tower was added after 1848.

The Catholic wooden Church of the Exaltation of the Holy Cross was built in 1897. It replaced the dilapidated church from the 16th century. The Renaissance winged altar dates from 1588.

== Notable people ==
- Karol Śliwka (1894–1943), Polish communist politician

== Twin towns – sister cities ==
Bystřice is twinned with:

- Goleszów, Poland
- Pińczów, Poland
- Svodín, Slovakia
- Tata, Hungary
