= Bukovec (Frýdek-Místek District) =

Bukovec Bukowiec
- Municipality
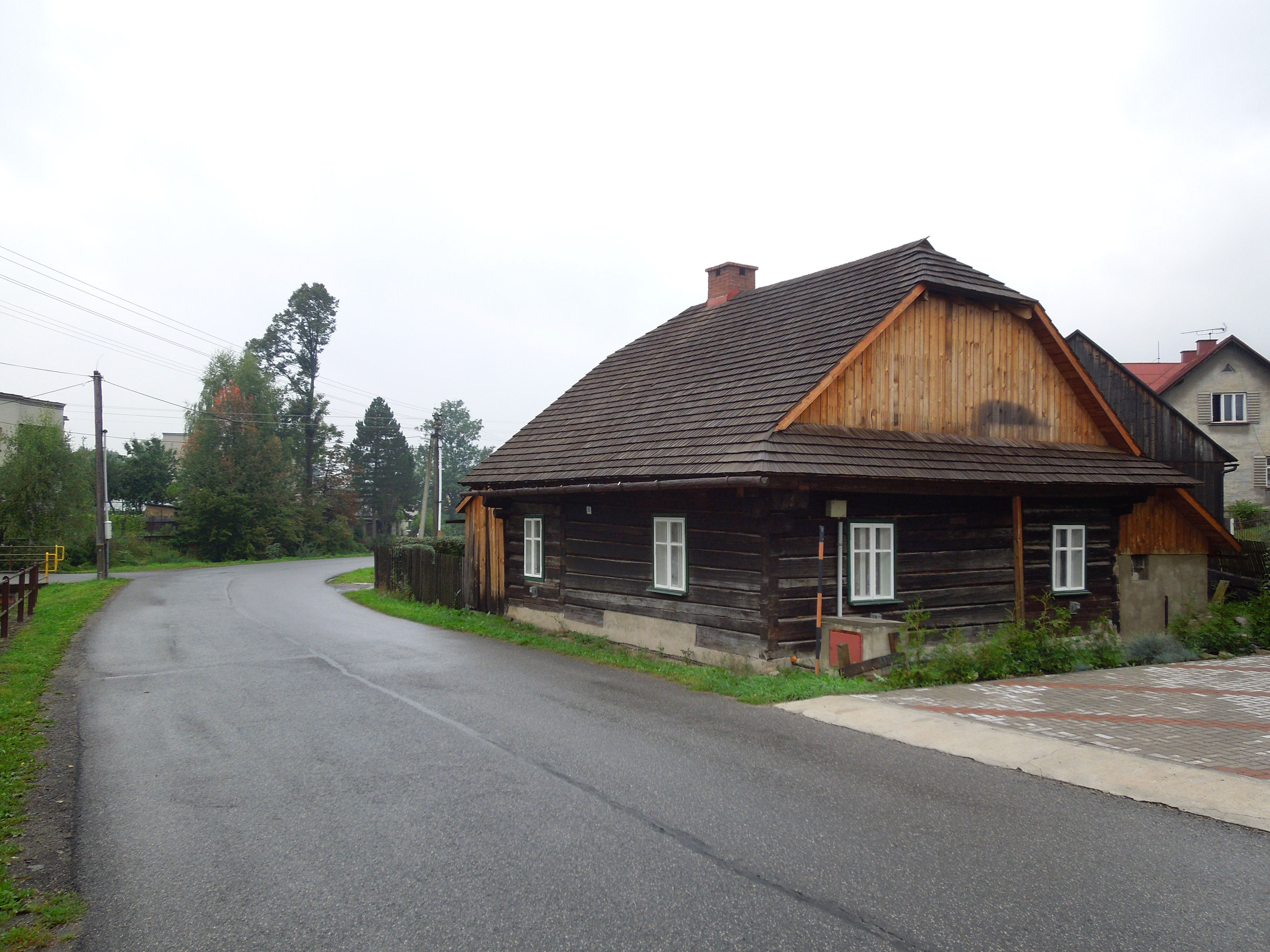
- Main street

- Flag Coat of arms

- Location in the Czech Republic
- Coordinates: 49°33′4″N 18°49′37″E
- Country: Czech Republic
- Region: Moravian-Silesian
- District: Frýdek-Místek
- Founded: 1353

Area
  - Total: 17.05 km^{2} (6.58 sq mi)
- Elevation: 455 m (1,493 ft)

Population (2026-01-01)
  - Total: 1,391
  - Density: 81.58/km^{2} (211.3/sq mi)
- Time zone: UTC+1 (CET)
  - Summer (DST): UTC+2 (CEST)
- Postal code: 739 85
- Website: www.bukovec.cz

Bukovec (Czech pronunciation: [ˈbukovɛts]; Polish: Bukowiec, German: Bukowetz) is a municipality and village in Frýdek-Místek District in the Moravian-Silesian Region of the Czech Republic. It has about 1,400 inhabitants. The municipality has a significant Polish minority.

== Etymology ==
The name of the village is derived from the Czech and Polish word buk, i.e. 'beech'. It refers to the beech forests that grew there.

== Geography ==
Bukovec is located about 36 kilometres (22 mi) southeast of Frýdek-Místek and 47 km (29 mi) southeast of Ostrava, in the historical region of Cieszyn Silesia. It borders Poland in the east and Slovakia in the south, but the tripoint of the three countries is located outside the municipality. Bukovec is the easternmost municipality of the country and the first municipality in the Czech Republic through which the Olza River flows.

The central part of the municipal territory with the village lies in the Jablunkov Furrow. The southern part extends into the Jablunkov Intermontane range and the northern part extends into the Silesian Beskids range. The highest peak of the municipality is the mountain Girová at 840 m (2,756 ft) above sea level.

== History ==
Bukovec was established by Duke Casimir I in 1353. The settlement initially served as an economic base for the local guardhouse on the southeastern border of the Duchy of Teschen. After 200 years, the village gained a farming-pasture character. The number of inhabitants rose very slowly. By 1647, only 20 people lived there. Settlers had many children and soon the population grew to 100.

After Revolutions of 1848 in the Austrian Empire a modern municipal division was introduced in the re-established Austrian Silesia. The village as a municipality was subscribed to the political district of Cieszyn and the legal district of Jablunkov. According to the censuses conducted in 1880–1910 the population of the municipality grew from 844 in 1880 to 1,071 in 1910 with the majority being native Polish-speakers (between 97.7% and 99.9%) accompanied by German-speaking (at most 19 or 2% in 1890) and Czech-speaking people (at most 3 or 0.3% in 1890). In terms of religion in 1910 the majority were Roman Catholics (92.7%), followed by Protestants (7.3%).

After World War I, Polish–Czechoslovak War and the division of Cieszyn Silesia in 1920, it became a part of Czechoslovakia. Following the Munich Agreement, in October 1938 together with the Trans-Olza region it was annexed by Poland, administratively adjoined to Cieszyn County of Silesian Voivodeship. It was then annexed by Nazi Germany at the beginning of World War II. After the war it was restored to Czechoslovakia.

From 1975 to 1990, Bukovec was a municipal part of Jablunkov. Since 1990, it has been a separate municipality.

== Demographics ==
According to the 2021 Census, Polish minority makes up 26.0% of the population.

Historical population

Year	Pop.	±%
1869	829	—
1880	844	+1.8%
1890	963	+14.1%
1900	1,020	+5.9%
1910	1,071	+5.0%

Year	Pop.	±%
1921	1,089	+1.7%
1930	1,152	+5.8%
1950	1,253	+8.8%
1961	1,290	+3.0%
1970	1,320	+2.3%

Year	Pop.	±%
1980	1,309	−0.8%
1991	1,348	+3.0%
2001	1,356	+0.6%
2011	1,339	−1.3%
2021	1,325	−1.0%

Source: Censuses

== Transport ==
There are no railways or major roads passing through the municipality.

== Sights ==
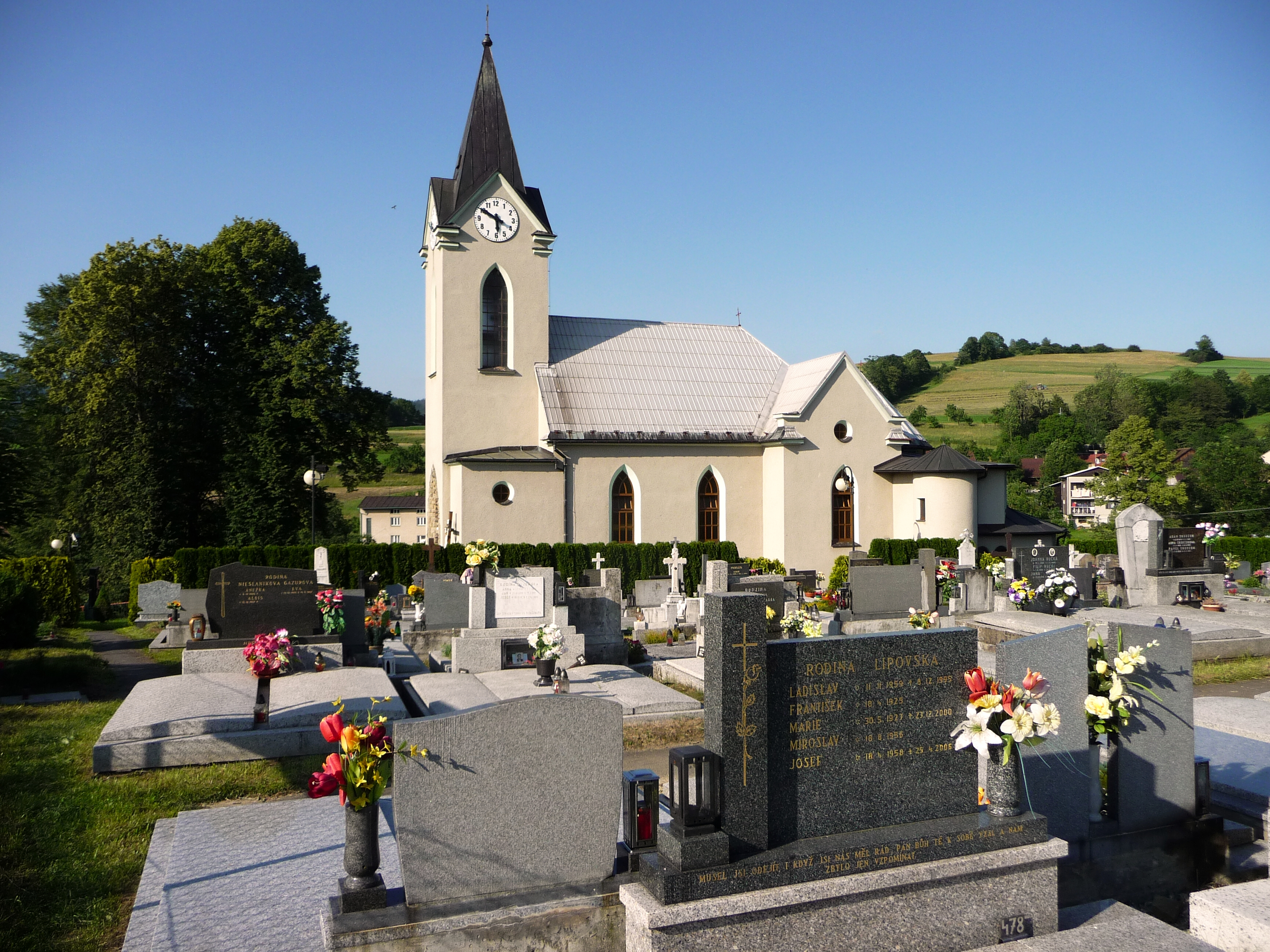
Church of the Assumption of the Blessed Virgin Mary

The main landmark of Bukovec is the Church of the Assumption of the Blessed Virgin Mary. It was built in 1938–1939.
