= Hluchová =

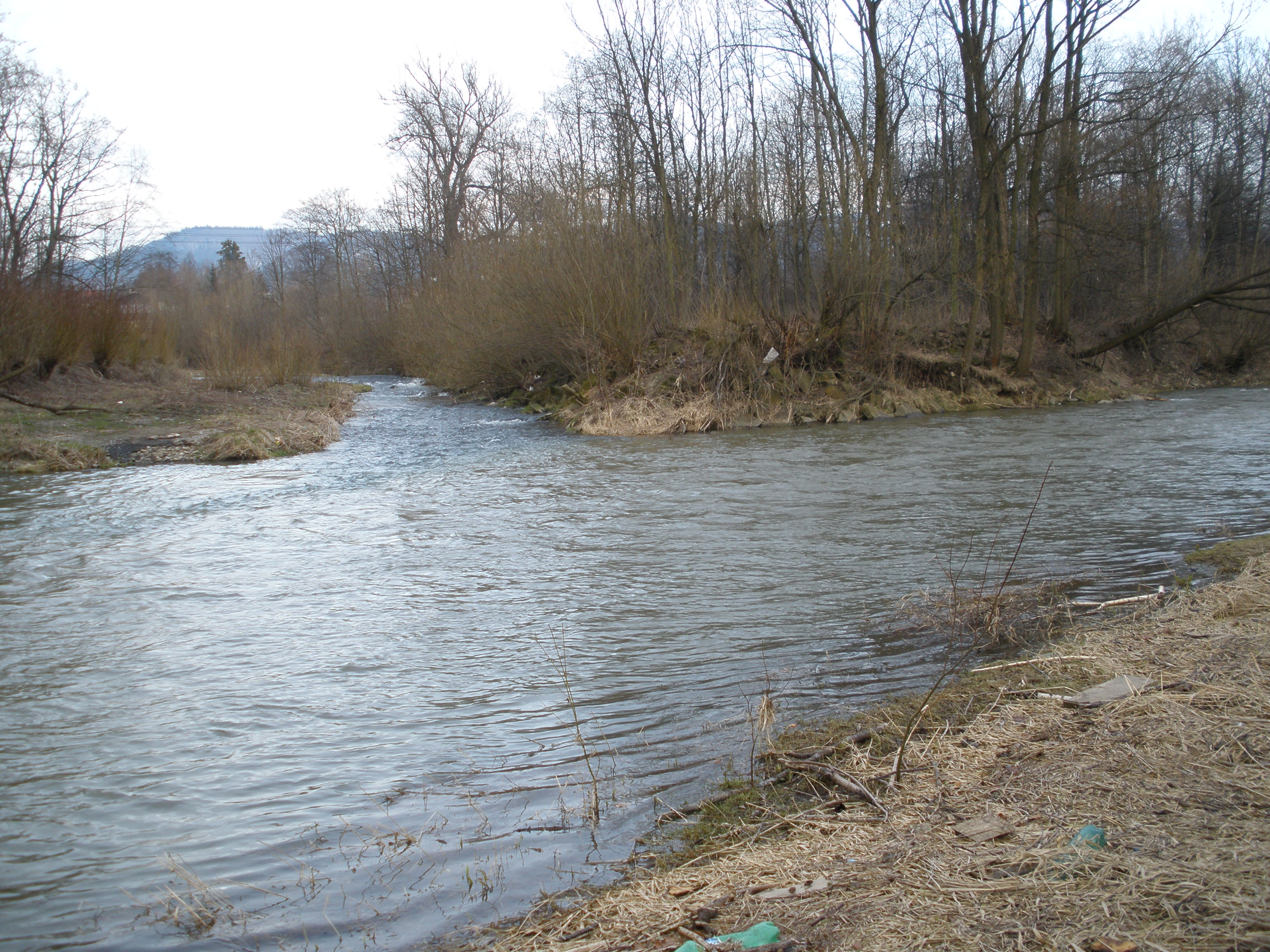
- Confluence of Hluchová and Olza

Location
- Country: Czech Republic

Physical characteristics
- Mouth
  - location: Olza
  - coordinates: 49°37′53″N 18°43′0″E
- Length: 12.3 km (7.6 mi)

Basin features
- Progression: Olza→ Oder→ Baltic Sea

Hluchová (Polish: Głuchówka or Głuchowa) is a 12.3 km long creek in Frýdek-Místek District, Moravian-Silesian Region, Czech Republic. It is the right tributary of the Olza, to which it enters in Bystřice. It originates near the border with Poland and flows through the municipalities of Nýdek and Bystřice.
