= Svodín =

Svodín Szőgyén
- Municipality
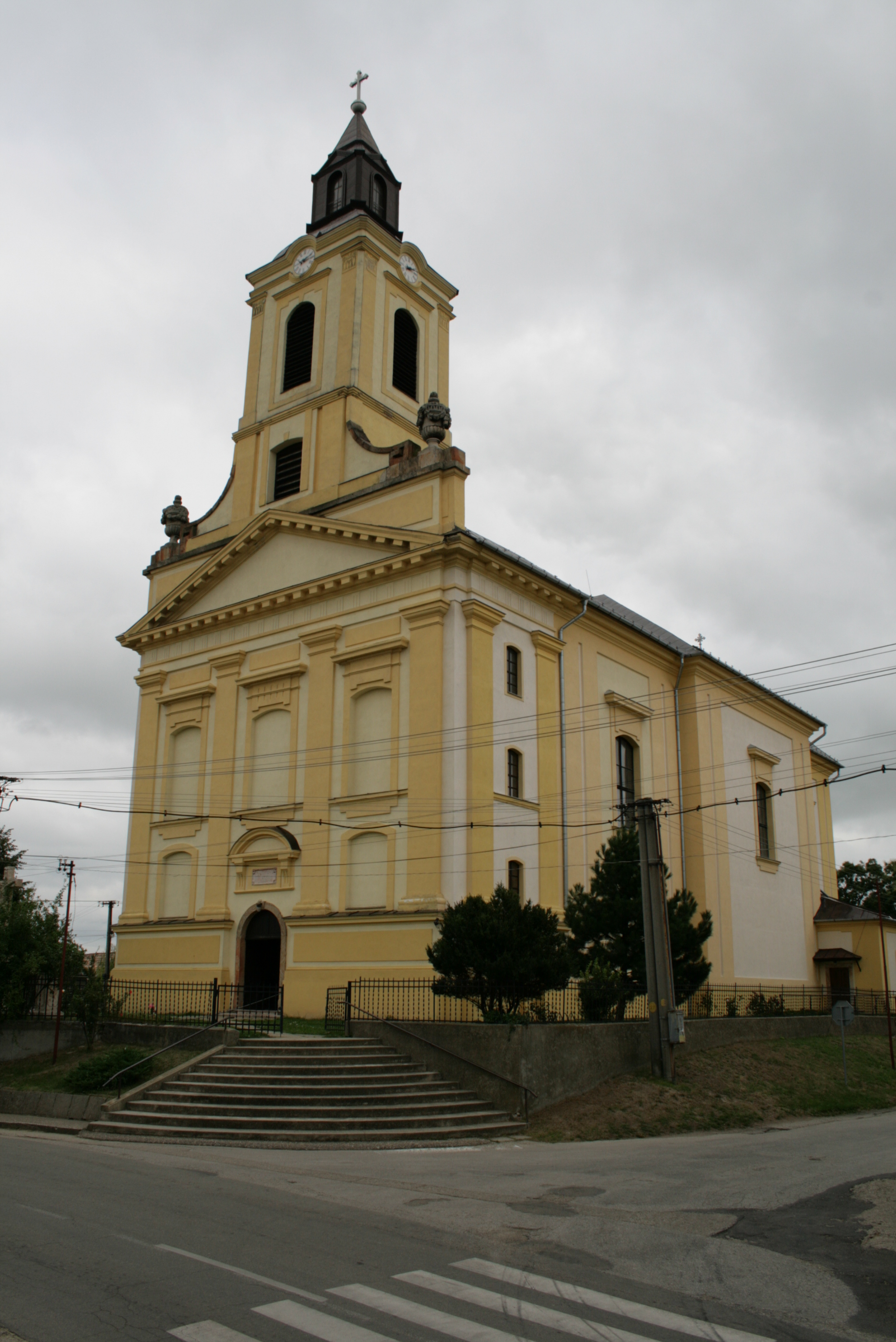

- Flag Coat of arms

- Location of Svodín in the Nitra Region Location of Svodín in Slovakia
- Coordinates: 47.91°N 18.50°E
- Country: Slovakia
- Region: Nitra Region
- District: Nové Zámky District
- First mentioned: 1156

Government
  - Mayor: Szabolcs Méri

Area
  - Total: 53.60 km^{2} (20.70 sq mi)
- Elevation: 193 m (633 ft)

Population (2025)
  - Total: 2,356
- Time zone: UTC+1 (CET)
  - Summer (DST): UTC+2 (CEST)
- Postal code: 943 54
- Area code: +421 36
- Vehicle registration plate (until 2022): NZ
- Website: www.svodin.sk

Svodín (Hungarian: Szőgyén) is a village and municipality in the Nové Zámky District in the Nitra Region of south-west Slovakia.

== Geography ==
The municipality lies at an altitude of 193 metres (633 ft) and covers an area of 53.60 km^{2} (20.70 sq mi) (2025).

== History ==
In historical records the village was first mentioned in 1416. The town had a Hungarian majority as early as the 17th century, according to the Turkish tax census. After the Austro-Hungarian army disintegrated in November 1918, Czechoslovak troops occupied the area, later acknowledged internationally by the Treaty of Trianon. Between 1938 and 1945 Svodín once more became part of Miklós Horthy's Hungary through the First Vienna Award. From 1945 until the Velvet Divorce, it was part of Czechoslovakia. Since then it has been part of Slovakia.

== Population ==
Population statistic (10 years)
Year	1995	2005	2015	2025
Count	2612	2634	2522	2356
Difference		+0.84%	−4.25%	−6.58%

Population statistic
Year	2024	2025
Count	2354	2356
Difference		+0.08%

It has a population of 2356 people (31 December 2025).

=== Ethnicity ===
Census 2021 (1+%)
Ethnicity	Number	Fraction
Hungarian	1712	70.97%
Slovak	662	27.44%
Not found out	144	5.97%
Total	2412	

In year 2021 was 2412 people by ethnicity 1712 as Hungarian, 662 as Slovak, 144 as Not found out, 7 as Czech, 7 as Other, 5 as Romani, 2 as Ukrainian, 2 as Austrian, 2 as German, 1 as Rusyn and 1 as Polish.

Note on population: The difference values of population numbers in the table "Population statistic" and in the sections "Ethnicity" & "Religion" is caused by the use of various statistical methods.

=== Religion ===
Census 2021 (1+%)
Religion	Number	Fraction
Roman Catholic Church	1808	74.96%
None	308	12.77%
Not found out	182	7.55%
Calvinist Church	38	1.58%
Total	2412	

In year 2021 was 2412 people by religion 1808 from Roman Catholic Church, 308 from None, 182 from Not found out, 38 from Calvinist Church, 23 from Evangelical Church, 19 from Christian Congregations in Slovakia, 15 from Greek Catholic Church, 6 from Other and not ascertained christian church, 6 from Other, 4 from Apostolic Church, 2 from Buddhism and 1 from United Methodist Church.

== Sights ==
- Archaeological Museum - The archaeologists of the Slovak National Museum excavated the remains of the damaged Saint Michael's church and an even older church standing on its place, between the years 1995 and 2001. They found interesting and edifying things, so the local government decided to show the findings to the public in the form of an exhibition. They have bought an other building next to the Folk-house. It is a ground-floor building with three rooms where the visitors can follow the systematized results of the researches.
- Art Gallery of Svodín - The first year of the International Creativ Art Camp had been organised in the village in the year 1999. Since then artists representing various creative styles, from several states (Slovakia, Hungary, Czech Republic, Poland, Romania, Canada) meet here every year.
- Church of the Assumption - This Roman Catholic church is the centre of religious life and its most important monument built in baroque style. It was sanctified in the year 1799 in honour of the Virgin Mary. It was damaged during the Second World War and rebuilt in 1957. Its interior was renewed in the years 1968 and at the end of the 80's.
- St. Michael's Church - Several historical sources prove that the first church of the village already existed in the 13th century, but the exact date of its building is unknown. This church with two towers, built in roman style, got several shots in the last month of the Second World War and later it was intentionally damaged. The retreating German military units had blown it up on 28 March 1945, except the sanctuary both towers and the aisle had been totally ruined. Today visitors maybe find their peace of mind among the ruins, in the cool shadow of the trees, in front of the open-air altar with a Calvary around.
- The Monument of the Victims of World War I. - The statue of heroes was erected in 1924 in honor of the victims of World War I.
- Statue of Pál Pathó - He was born into a noble family on June 7, 1795, in Mužla, Slovakia. His father was János Pathó, his mother was Borbála Németh. He was the deputy judge of Esztergom county and the clerk of the village of Svodín. In 1848 he was the organizer of the local national guard. He died on April 28, 1855, in a pneumonia chest in Svodín. His grave can be viewed at the local cemetery.
- Educational trail from Strekov to Svodín - The starting and ending point of the educational trail is the Roman Catholic church of the two village. The length of the educational trail is 9.3 km. Every 50 metres of the route is a tourist sign according to the educational trail standard, and a total of 12 direction signs were installed. There are a total of 6 large (1.8 m x 1.2 m) information boards along the educational trail. In terms of content, it points out the valuable flora and fauna of the area, introduces the Cigléd pilgrimage site, presents the folk traditions and cultural-historical values of the two villages, as well as the Central European Way of Mary.

== Population ==
It has a population of about 2,625 people, which is about 78% Hungarian, 20% Slovak and 2% Romany.

== Facilities ==
The village has a small public library, a gym, and a football pitch. It also has a DVD rental store.

== Twin towns – sister cities ==
Svodín is twinned with:

- Bystřice, Czech Republic
- Pińczów, Poland
- Tata, Hungary
