= Karol Śliwka =

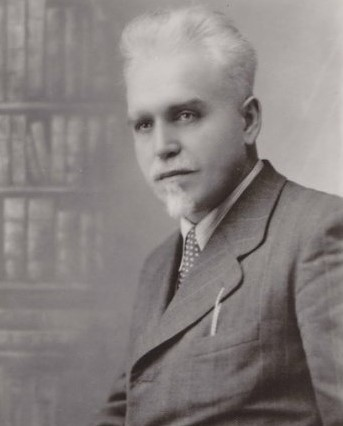

Member of the National Assembly of Czechoslovakia
- In office 1925–1938

Personal details
- Born: 13 March 1894 Bystrzyca, Austrian Silesia, Austria-Hungary
- Died: 19 March 1943 (aged 49) Mauthausen-Gusen concentration camp, Nazi Germany
- Party: Communist Party of Czechoslovakia
- Occupation: Politician

Karol Śliwka (Polish pronunciation: [ˈkarɔl ˈɕlifka]; 13 March 1894 – 19 March 1943) was a Polish communist politician. He was one of the most prominent political leaders of the Polish minority in Trans-Olza region of the First Czechoslovak Republic and a member of National Assembly of the Czechoslovak Republic from 1925 to 1938.

== Biography ==
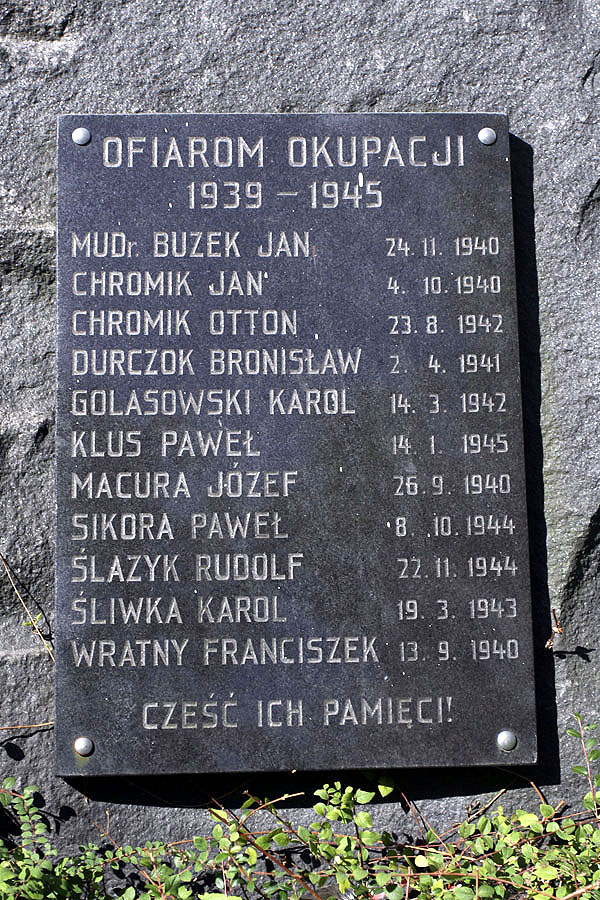
Plaque in Doubrava, commemorating local victims of World War II. Śliwka is one of eleven persons listed.

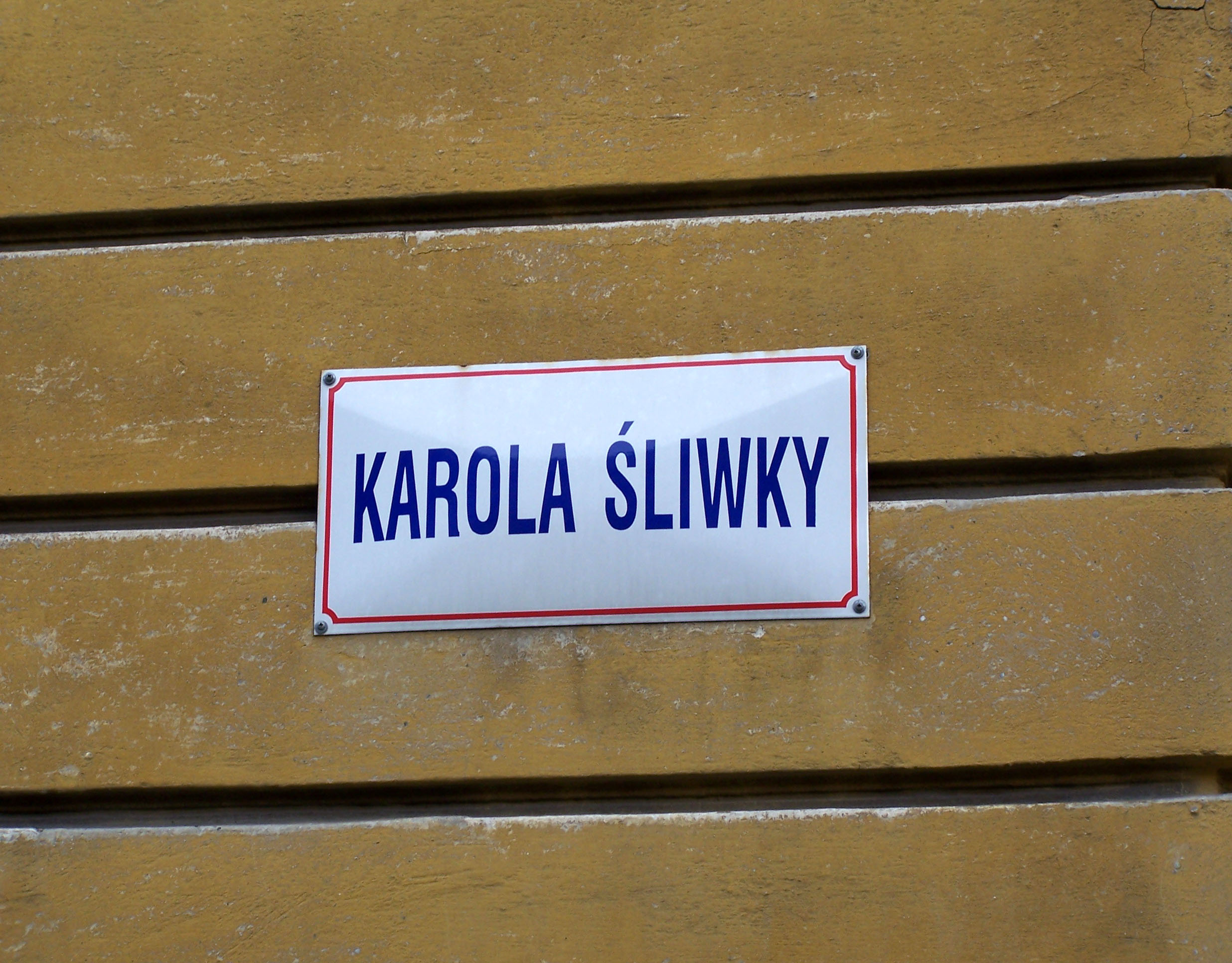
Plaque of street in Karviná-Fryštát bearing Śliwka's name

Śliwka was born son of a metallurgy worker in Bystrzyca. After finishing five classes of primary school in his native village he entered the Polish gymnasium (grammar school) in Cieszyn.

After outbreak of World War I he volunteered to army of General Józef Haller but after several months became a prisoner of war in Russia from 1915 to 1918 (mostly in Kaluga). In 1917 he joined the Bolshevik Party. In 1921 he became an Executive Committee member of the Communist Party of Czechoslovakia. He was the editor of the newspaper Głos Robotniczy ('Workers Voice'). Śliwka was the foremost leader of the Communist Party of Czechoslovakia within the Polish minority. He was an advocate of unity between Polish, Czech and German communists in Český Těšín.

Śliwka represented the Communist Party of Czechoslovakia in the Czechoslovak National Assembly between 1925 and 1938. As a parliamentarian, Śliwka fought for the rights of the Polish minority in the Czechoslovak Republic. Following the cession of Trans-Olza territory to Poland, Śliwka and another Polish parliamentarian Leon Wolf, leader of the League of Silesian Catholics, lost their parliamentary seats on 30 October 1938. Other parliamentarians representing national minorities suffered a similar fate. Polish authorities adopted strict measures against communist activists. Śliwka and another activist Franciszek Kraus have been jailed in Mokotów Prison in Warsaw. He was released after he signed a testimony saying he is breaking up with communist movement.

As a result, he was expelled from the Communist Party of Czechoslovakia. In April 1940 he was arrested by Gestapo and jailed in Moravská Ostrava and later in other towns. In 1942 he was sentenced for five years in prison, which he served in Cieszyn. Śliwka was eventually transferred to the Mauthausen-Gusen concentration camp, where he officially died in March 1943. After World War II he was dishonoured in Czechoslovakia for alleged betrayal of communist ideals in 1938. He was exonerated in 1969.

== Bibliography ==
- Chlebowczyk, Józef (1972). Karol Śliwka i towarzysze walki: z dziejów ruchu komunistycznego na Zaolziu (in Polish). Kraków: Państwowe Wydawnictwo Naukowe. OCLC 3305433.
