= Nýdek =

Nýdek Nydek
- Municipality
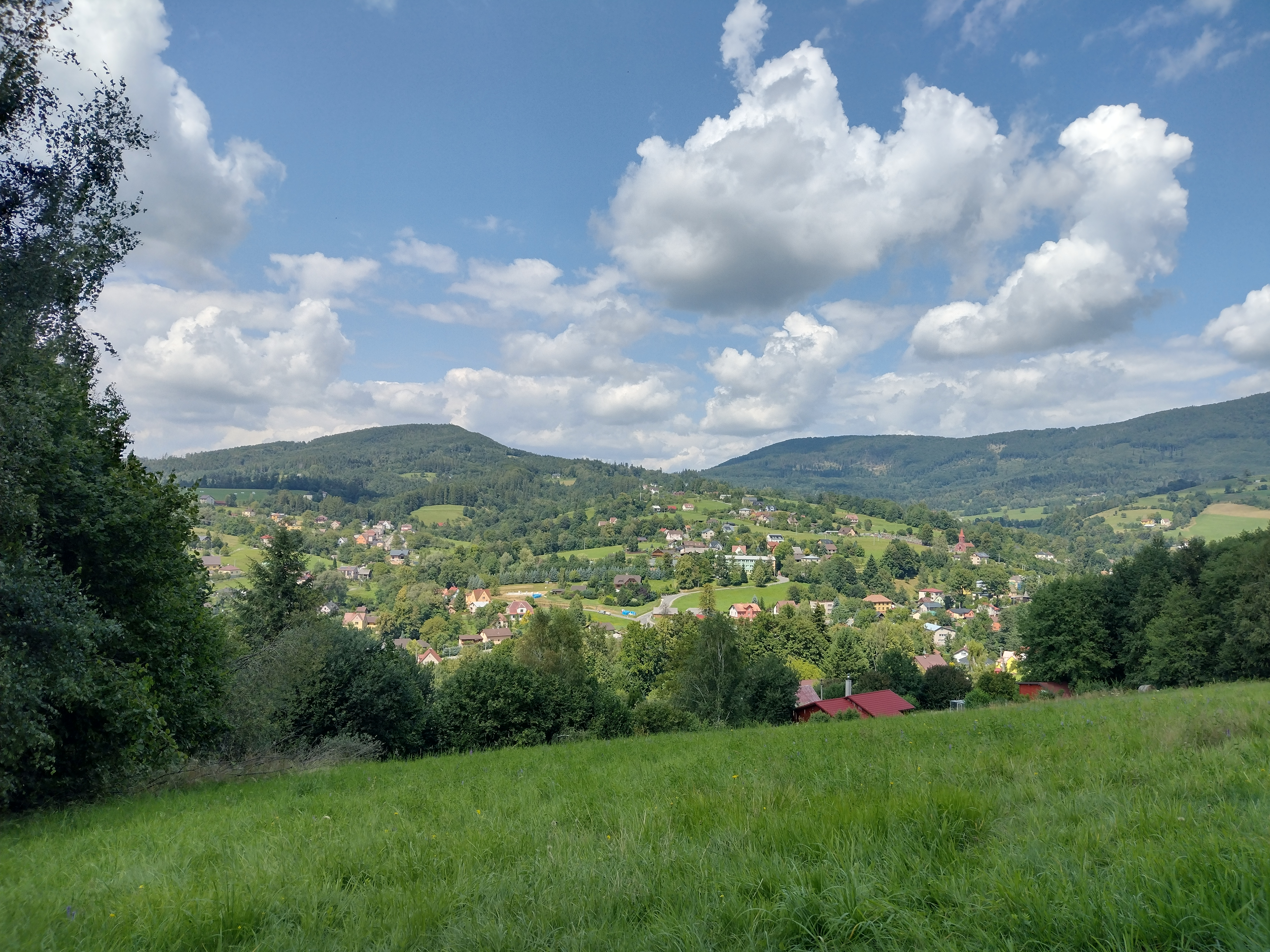
- View from the southwest

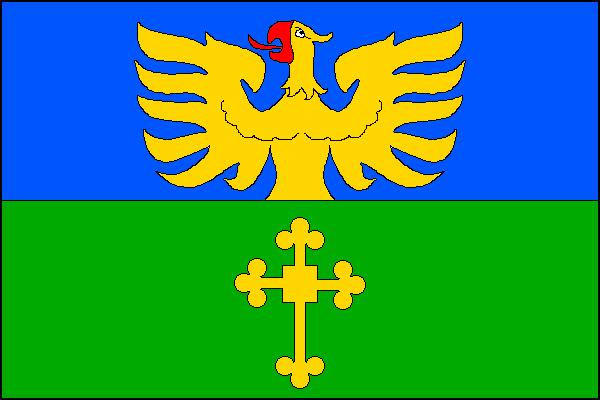
- Flag Coat of arms

- Location in the Czech Republic
- Coordinates: 49°39′22″N 18°45′25″E
- Country: Czech Republic
- Region: Moravian-Silesian
- District: Frýdek-Místek
- First mentioned: 1430

Area
  - Total: 28.23 km^{2} (10.90 sq mi)
- Elevation: 410 m (1,350 ft)

Population (2026-01-01)
  - Total: 2,047
  - Density: 72.51/km^{2} (187.8/sq mi)
- Time zone: UTC+1 (CET)
  - Summer (DST): UTC+2 (CEST)
- Postal code: 739 96
- Website: www.nydek.cz

Nýdek (Czech pronunciation: [ˈniːdɛk]; Polish: Nydek, German: Niedek) is a municipality and village in Frýdek-Místek District in the Moravian-Silesian Region of the Czech Republic. It has about 2,000 inhabitants. Nýdek is located in the Silesian Beskids mountain range, near the border with Poland. The municipality has a significant Polish minority.

== Etymology ==
The name of Nýdek was probably derived from the personal name Nidek.

== Geography ==
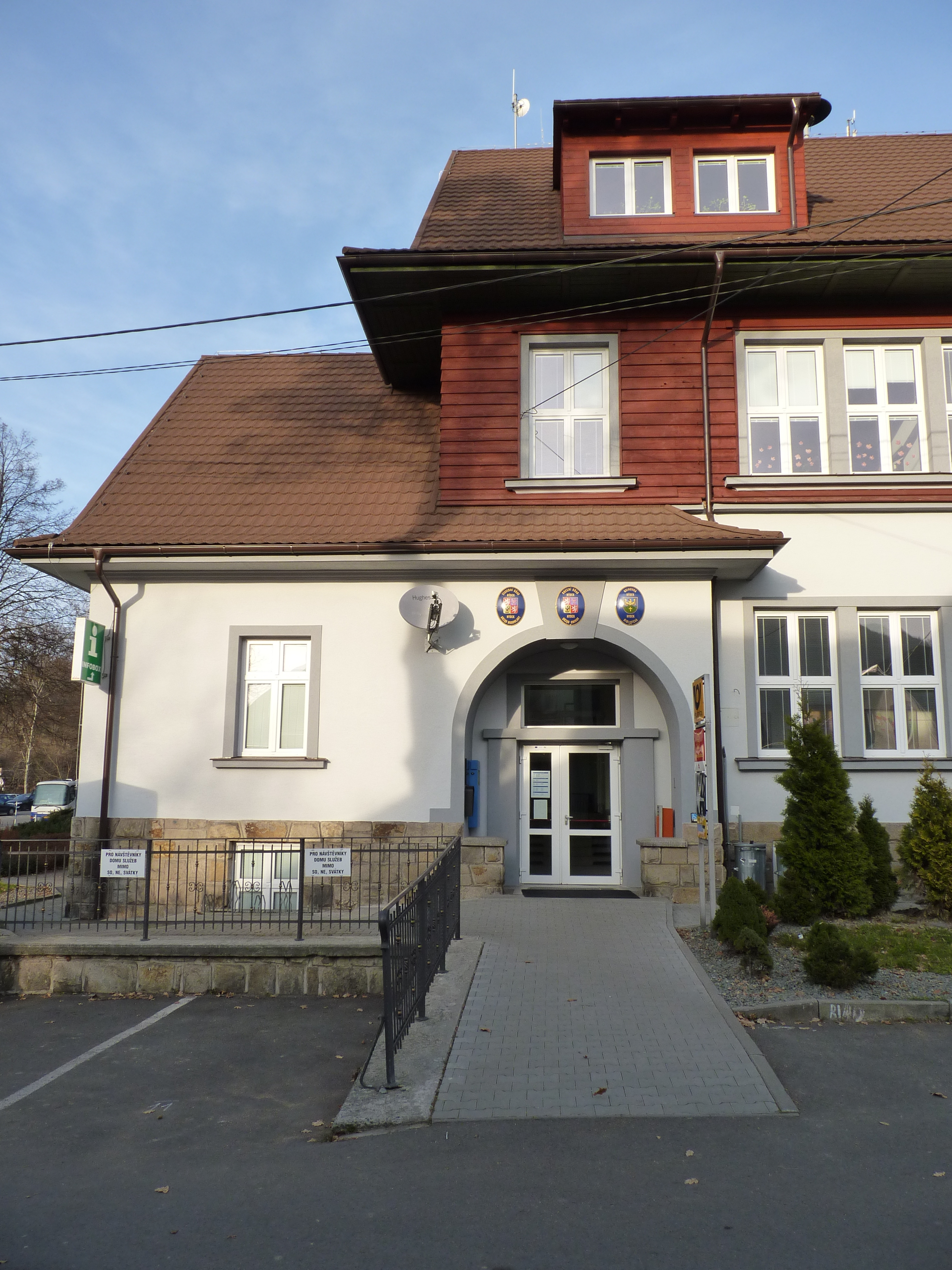
Municipal office

Nýdek is located about 28 kilometres (17 mi) east of Frýdek-Místek and 36 km (22 mi) southeast of Ostrava, on the border with Poland. It lies in the historical region of Cieszyn Silesia, in the Silesian Beskids mountain range. The highest point is Velká Čantoryje at 995 m (3,264 ft) above sea level, located on the Czech–Polish border. The Hluchová River flows through the municipality.

== History ==
The first written mention of Nýdek is from 1430, when Bolesław I, Duke of Cieszyn donated this territory to Nidek, who founded here a settlement. The first mention of the settlement is from 1456. Politically the village belonged then to the Duchy of Teschen that was a fee of the Kingdom of Bohemia, which after 1526 became part of the Habsburg monarchy.

After 1540s Protestant Reformation prevailed in the Duchy of Teschen and later local Lutherans built a wooden church here (it was not built earlier by Catholics). It was taken from them (as one from around fifty buildings) in the region by a special commission and given back to the Roman Catholic Church on 21 March 1654.

From the 15th century until 1792, Nýdek was owned by the Gočálkovský family. In 1770, iron ore was discovered here, which caused population growth and development of the village. Nýdek was bought by Teschener Kammer in 1792 for 46,000 florins.

After Revolutions of 1848 in the Austrian Empire a modern municipal division was introduced in the re-established Austrian Silesia. Nýdek as a municipality was subscribed to the political district of Teschen and the legal district of Jablunkau. According to the censuses conducted in 1880–1910 the population of the municipality grew from 1,567 in 1880 to 1,747 in 1910 with a majority being native Polish-speakers (between 94.7% and 97.7%) accompanied by German-speaking (at most 74 or 4% in 1900) and Czech-speaking people (at most 17 or 0.9% in 1880). In terms of religion in 1910 the majority were Protestants (93.6%), followed by Roman Catholics (86 or 4.9%), Jews (7 or 0.4%) and 19 others.

After World War I, Polish–Czechoslovak War and the division of Cieszyn Silesia in 1920, the municipality became a part of Czechoslovakia. Following the Munich Agreement, in October 1938 together with the Trans-Olza region it was annexed by Poland, administratively adjoined to Cieszyn County of Silesian Voivodeship. It was then annexed by Nazi Germany at the beginning of World War II. After the war it was restored to Czechoslovakia.

== Demographics ==
According to the 2021 Census, Polish minority makes up 17.0% of the population.

Historical population

Year	Pop.	±%
1869	1,567	—
1880	1,567	+0.0%
1890	1,643	+4.9%
1900	1,705	+3.8%
1910	1,747	+2.5%

Year	Pop.	±%
1921	1,781	+1.9%
1930	1,856	+4.2%
1950	2,011	+8.4%
1961	2,226	+10.7%
1970	2,081	−6.5%

Year	Pop.	±%
1980	2,027	−2.6%
1991	1,907	−5.9%
2001	1,952	+2.4%
2011	1,990	+1.9%
2021	2,091	+5.1%

Source: Censuses

== Transport ==
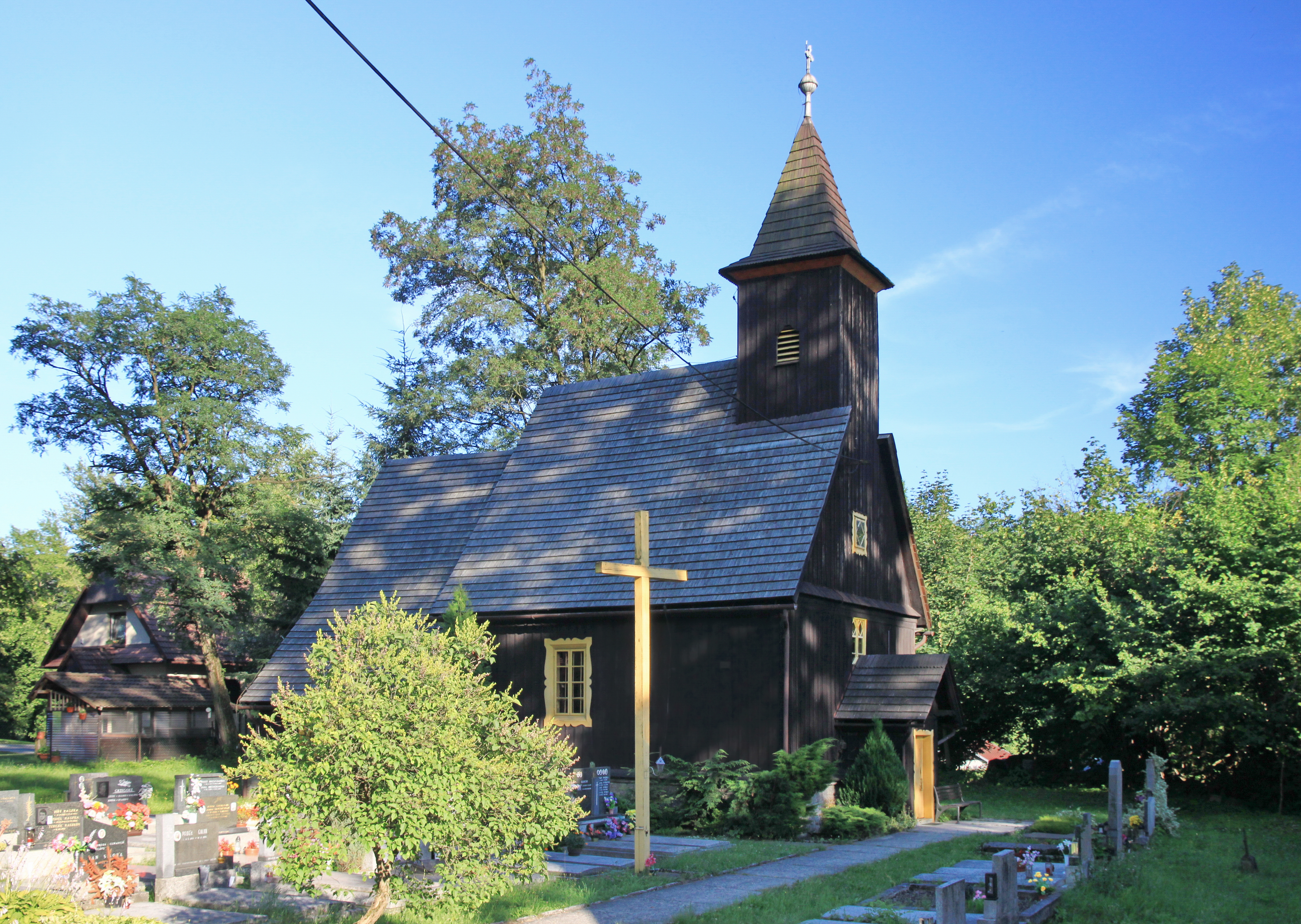
Church of Saint Nicholas

There are no railways or major roads passing through the municipality.

== Sport ==
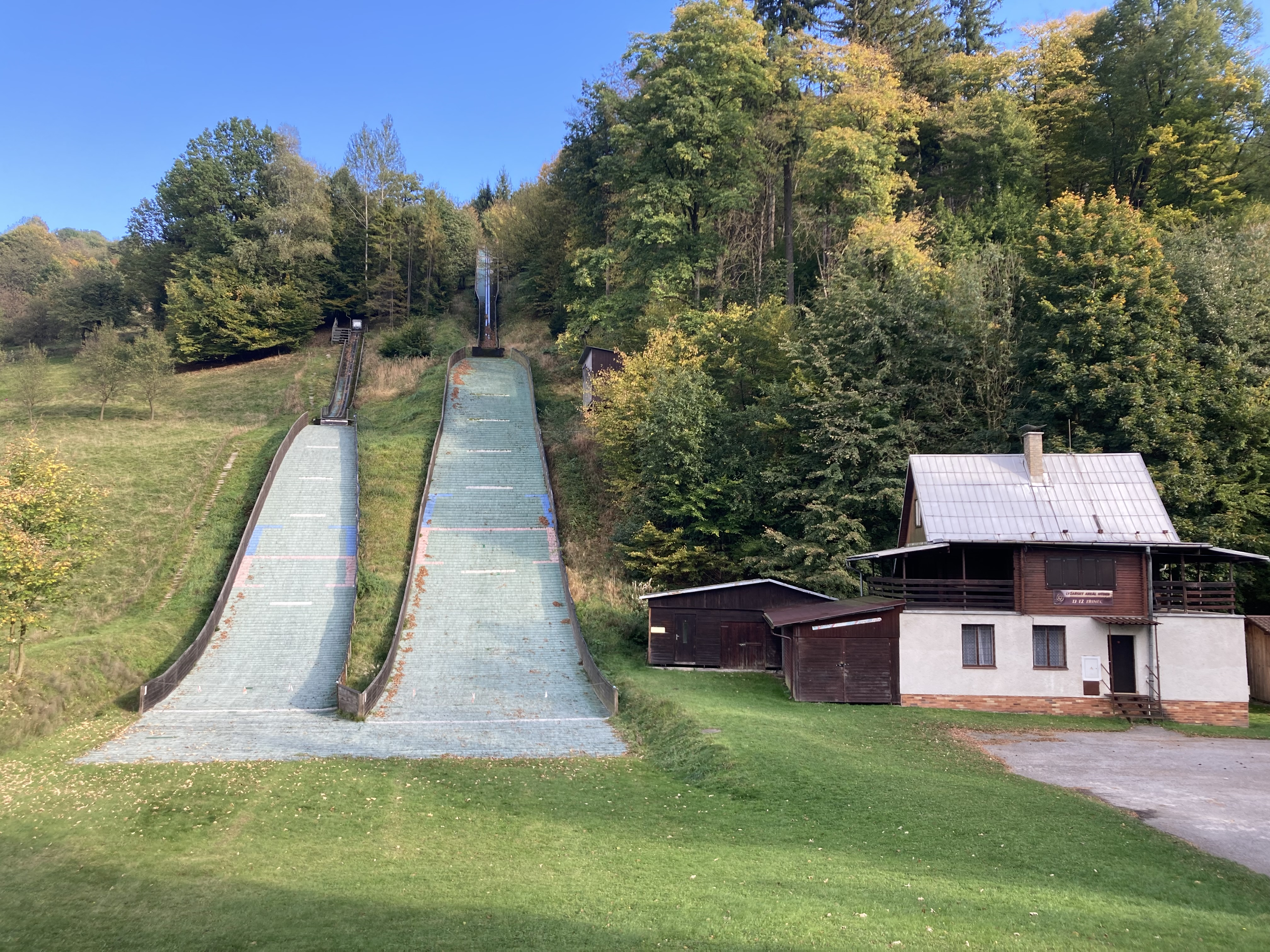
Ski jumping hill

Nýdek has a tradition of winter sports. In 1933, a ski jumping hill was built here, which still works today.

== Sights ==
The most important historical monument is the Church of Saint Nicholas. It is a wooden church, built in 1576. The tower dates from the end of the 18th century.

An observation tower is located on the Velká Čantoryje mountain. It belongs to the most visited tourist destinations in the Moravian-Silesian Region.

== Notable people ==
- Aniela Kupiec (1920–2019), Polish poet

== Gallery ==
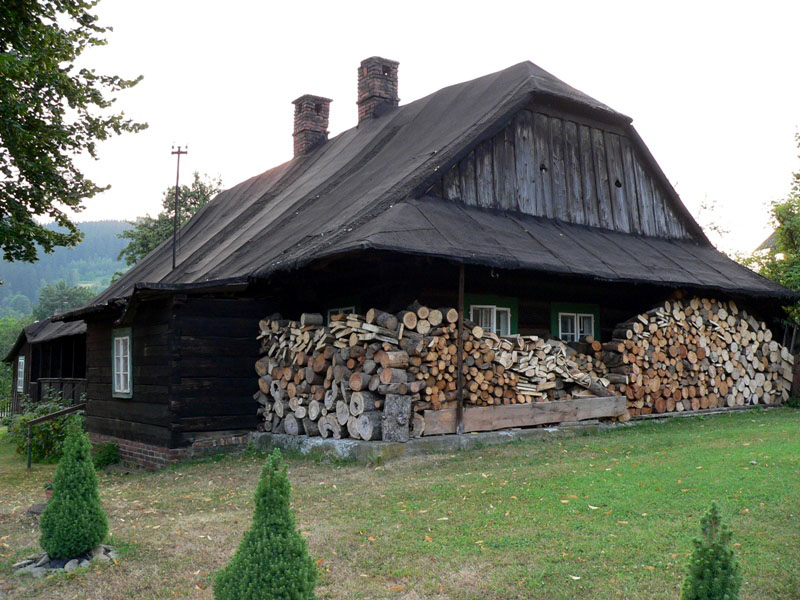
Traditional old wooden house

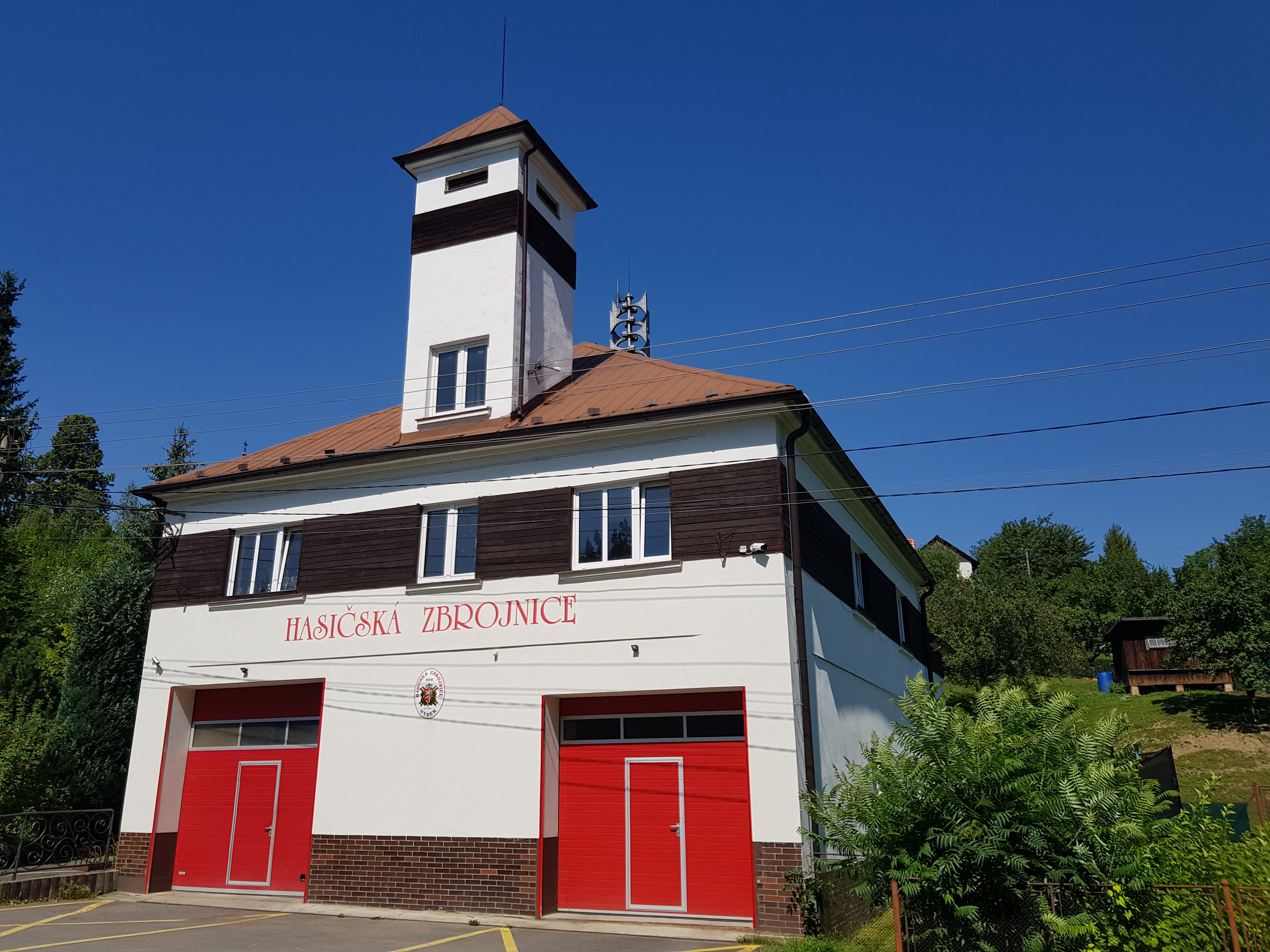
Fire station

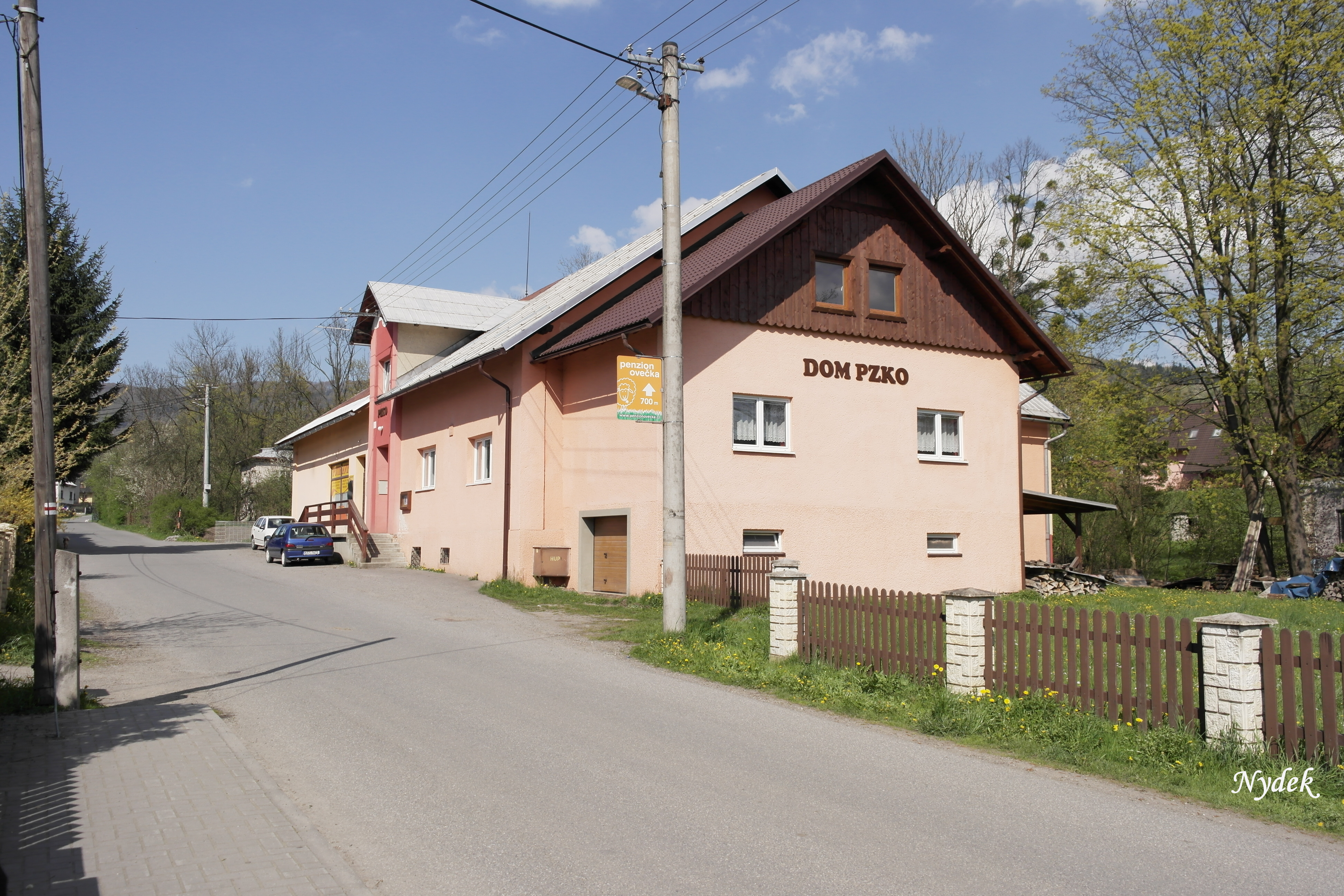
PZKO House
