= Szotkówka =

River in Poland

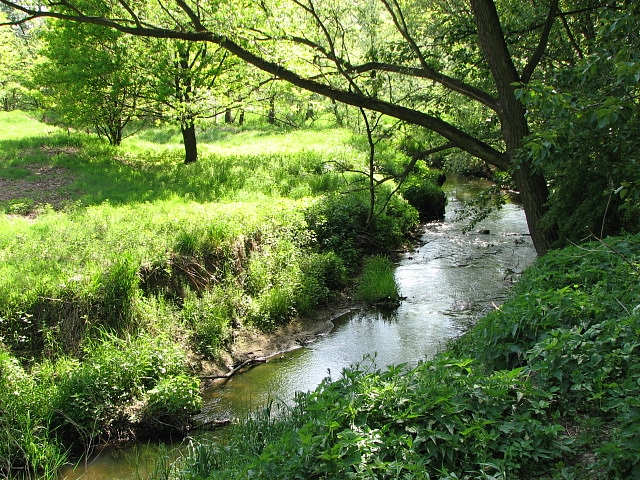
- Szotkówka in Gmina Godów

Location
- Country: Poland
- Voivodeship: Silesian

Physical characteristics
- Source
  - location: near Świerklany, Rybnik County
  - coordinates: 50°01′07.1″N 18°34′45.7″E
- Mouth: Olza
  - location: west of Godów, Wodzisław County
  - coordinates: 49°55′23″N 18°27′37″E
  - elevation: 201.2 m (660 ft)
- Length: 21.29 km (13.23 mi)
- Basin size: 104.96 km^{2} (40.53 mi^{2})

Basin features
- Progression: Olza→ Oder→ Baltic Sea

Szotkówka is a river of Poland, a tributary of the Olza near Godów. Its own tributaries include the Kolejówka.
