= Olza (river) =

Olza Olše
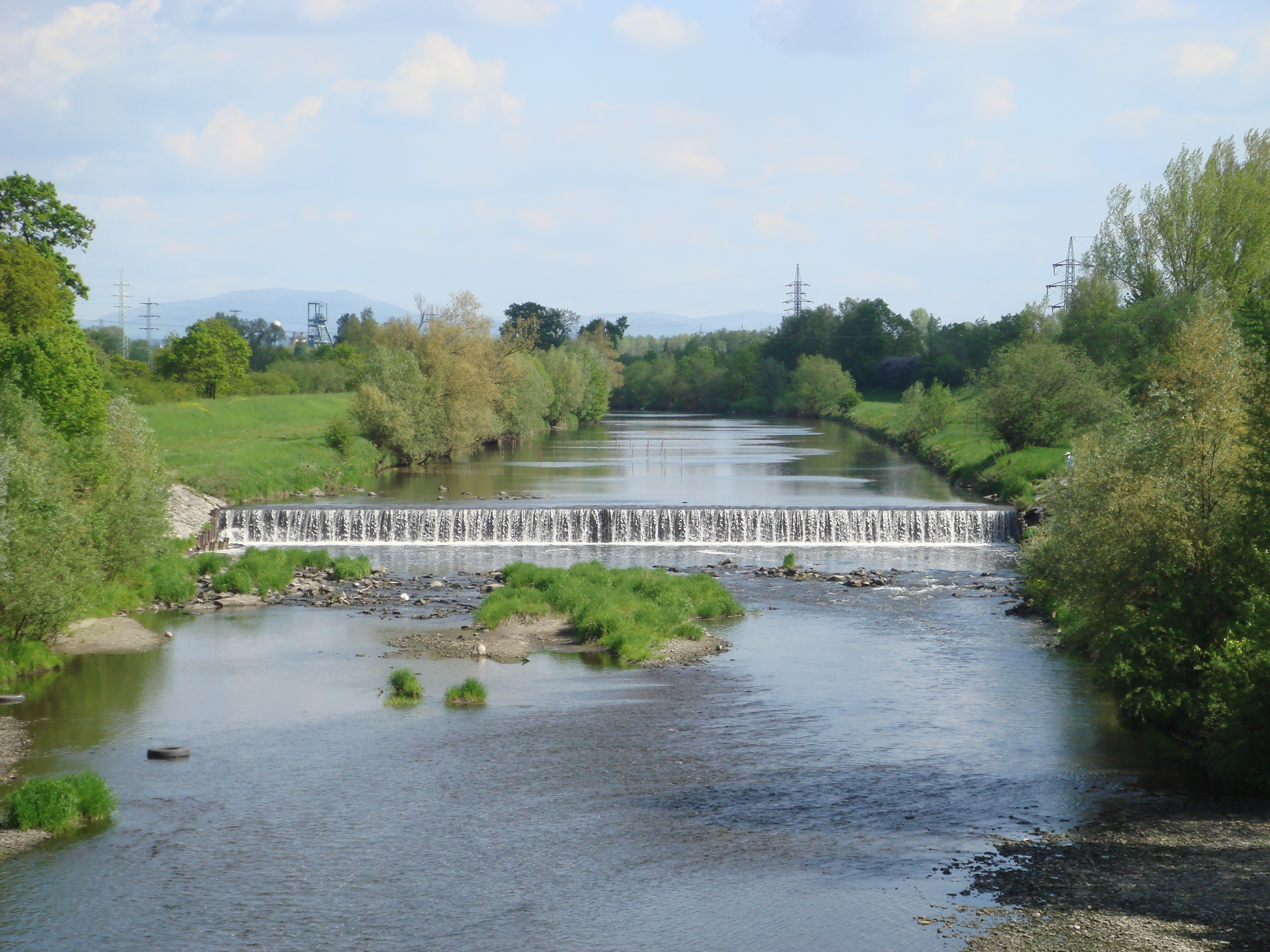
- The Olza in Karviná

Location
- Countries: Czech Republic; Poland
- Region/ Voivodeship: Moravian-Silesian; Silesian

Physical characteristics
- Source
  - location: Istebna, Silesian Beskids
  - coordinates: 49°35′2″N 18°59′1″E
  - elevation: 842 m (2,762 ft)
- Mouth
  - location: Oder
  - coordinates: 49°56′55″N 18°20′0″E
  - elevation: 190 m (623 ft)
- Length: 89.1 km (55.4 mi)
- Basin size: 1,107 km^{2} (427 sq mi)
- Discharge
  - average: 15.0 m^{3}/s (530 cu ft/s) near estuary

Basin features
- Progression: Oder→ Baltic Sea

The Olza (Czech: Olše (Note: Czech pronunciation: [ˈolʃɛ]), German: Olsa) is a river in the Czech Republic and Poland, a right tributary of the Oder River. It flows through the Silesian Voivodeship in Poland and through the Moravian-Silesian Region in the Czech Republic. It is 89.1 km (55.4 mi) long. The river forms a significant part of the Czech–Polish state border.

== Etymology ==
The name is derived from the Proto-Slavic word oliga, meaning 'a river rich in water'. The origin of the name was demonstrated in 1900 by Czech linguist and writer Vincenc Prasek and the revelation was confirmed by various etymological studies in the 20th century. There was also a theory that the name is a derivative of the Germanic Aliza, meaning 'flow'.

The oldest written mention of the Olza is in a letter written by Duke Mieszko in 1290. The river was then mentioned in a written document in 1611 as the Oldza. At the end of the 19th century, with the rise of mass nationalism, both Polish and Czech activists claimed the name Olza to be not Polish enough, on the one hand, and insufficiently Czech, on the other.

Local people always used the Olza name, regardless of their national or ethnic origin. However, the central administration in Prague saw Olza as a Polish name and when most of the river became a part of Czechoslovakia in 1920, it tried to change its name to the Czech form, Olše. However, a degree of dualism in the naming persisted until the 1960s, when the Central State Administration of Geodesy and Cartography ruled that the only official form in the Czech Republic was Olše. This modern Czech name literally means 'alder' in Czech.

== Characteristic ==
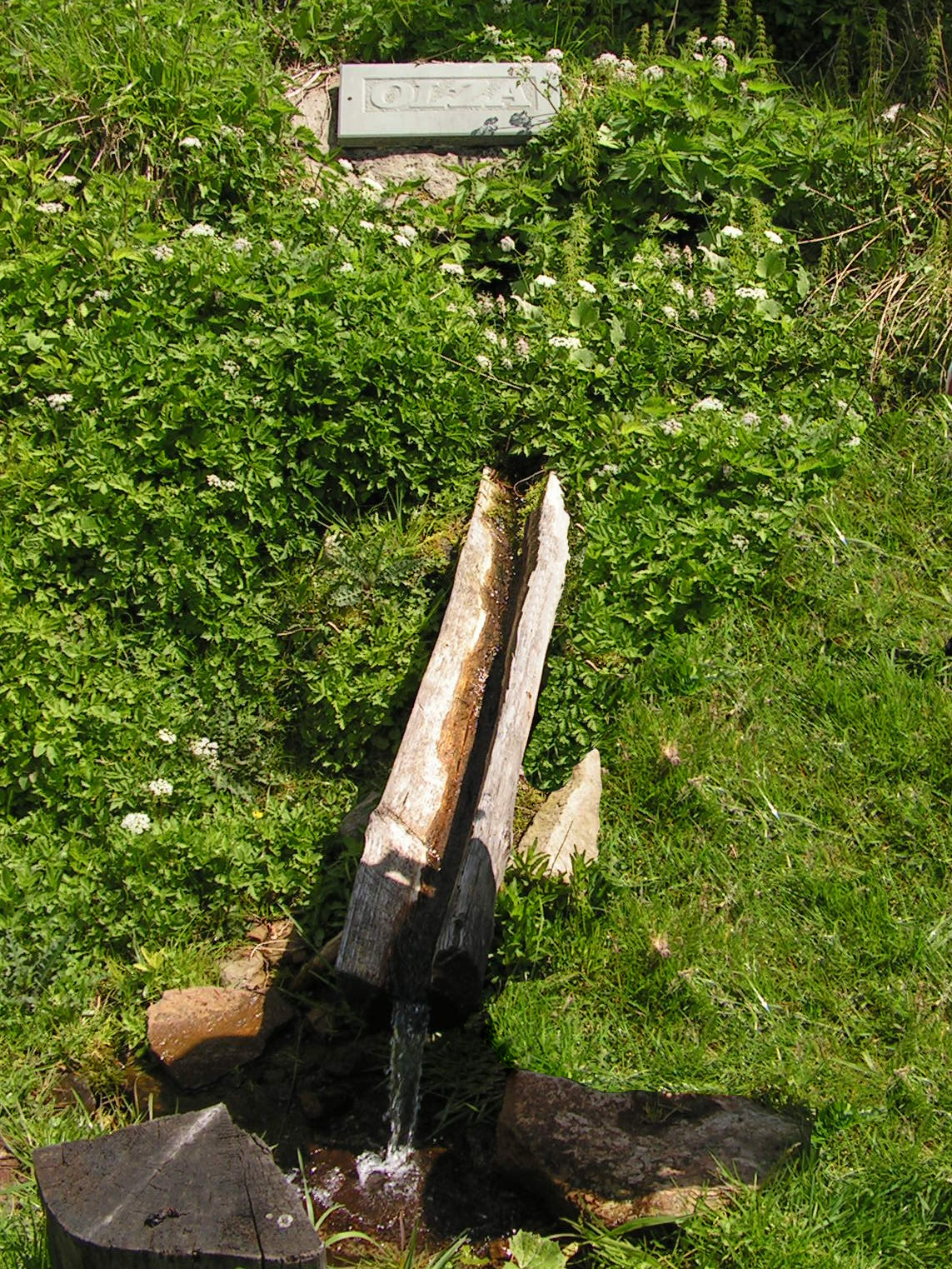
Spring of the Olza

The Olza originates in the territory of Gmina Istebna in the Silesian Beskids at an elevation of 842 m (2,762 ft) and flows to the Czech–Polish border in Bohumín/Gorzyce, where it merges with the Oder River at an elevation of 190 m (623 ft). Its drainage basin has an area of 1,107 km^{2} (427 sq mi), of which 636.1 km^{2} (245.6 sq mi) is in the Czech Republic. The average discharge at its mouth is 15.0 m^{3}/s (530 cu ft/s).

The Olza forms two sections of the Czech–Polish state border with a total length of 25.3 km (15.7 mi). Length figures vary by source. According to the newest official measurements, the Czech part of the river (including the Czech–Polish state border) is 73.1 km (45.4 mi) long. The length of the Polish section of the river to the first crossing of the state border is usually stated as 16 km (10 mi), which means that according to the latest measurements, the river has a total length of 89.1 km (55.4 mi). However, based on older measurements, the total length of the river is stated as 86.2 km (53.6 mi), 83 km (52 mi) or even 99 km (62 mi).

The longest tributaries of the Olza are:

Tributary	Length (km)	River km	Side
Stonávka	33.7	19.7	left
Petrůvka / Pietrówka	31.4	12.8	right
Szotkówka	21.3	10.2	right
Lomná	17.6	64.2	left
Ropičanka	16.5	38.7	left
Tyra	13.0	45.9	left
Bobrówka	12.7	35.1	right
Hluchová	12.6	55.3	right
Kopytná	11.7	55.2	left
Lutyňka	10.7	3.3	left

== Course ==
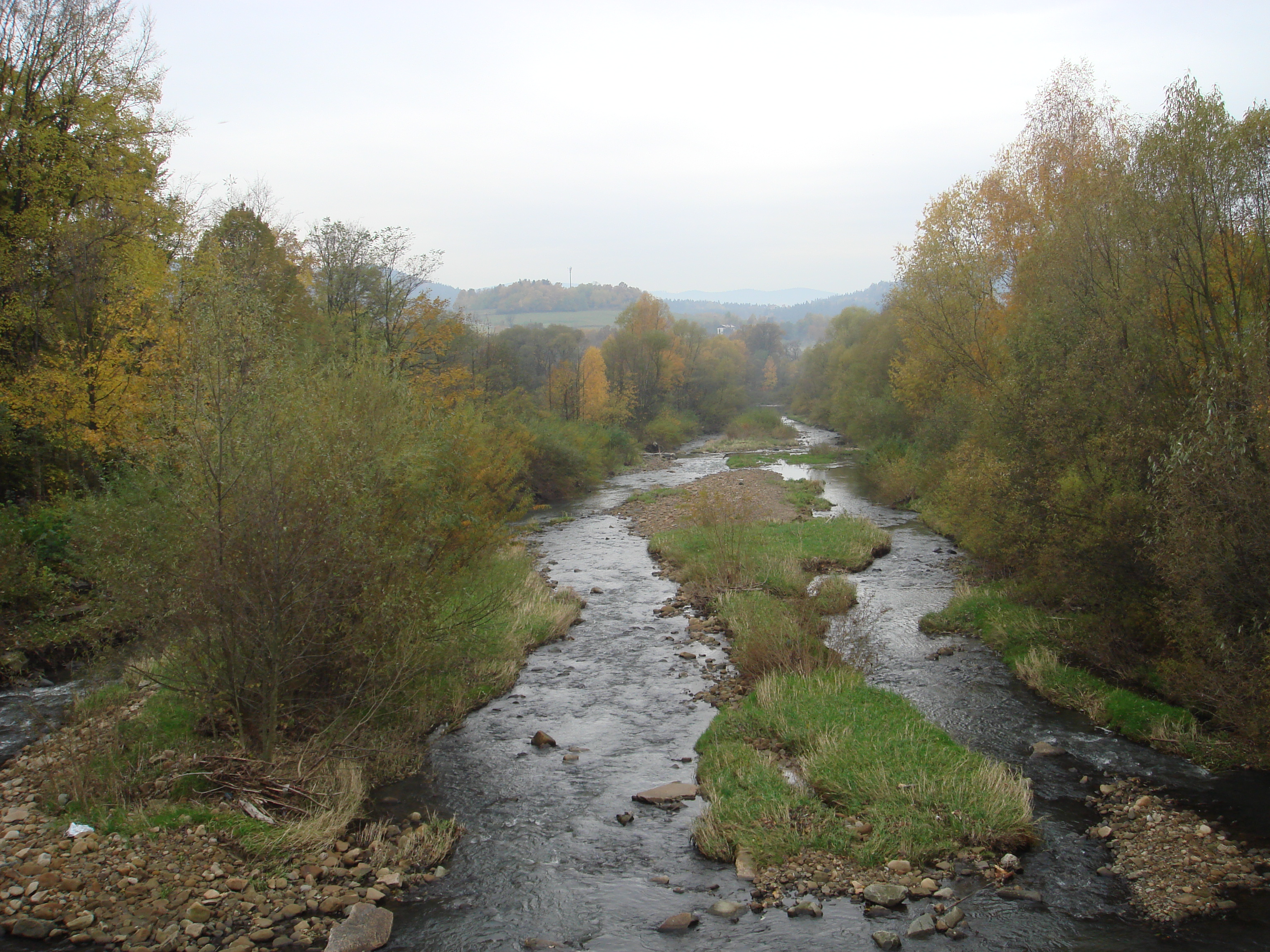
Upper course of the Olza in Bukovec

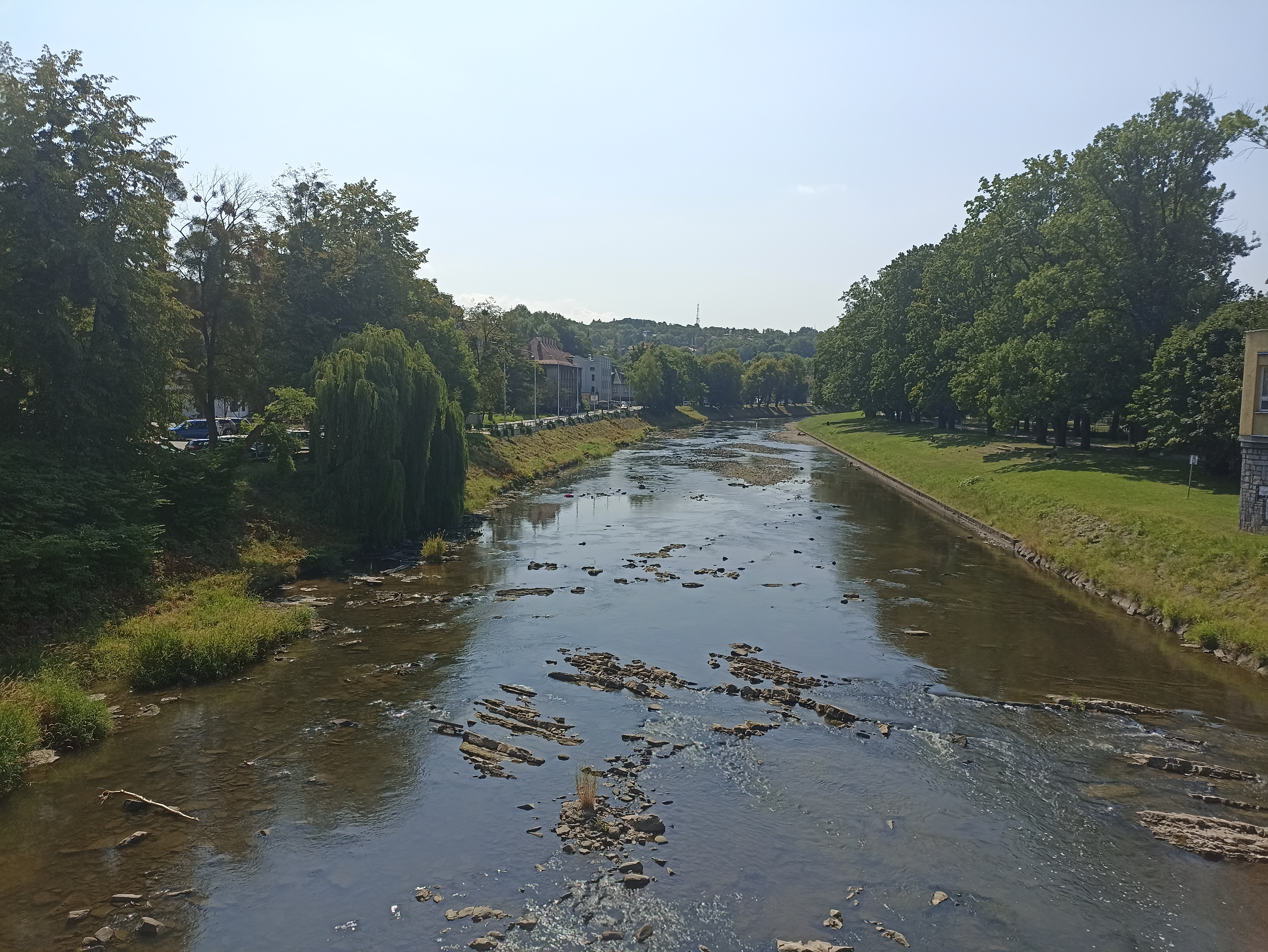
The Olza forming the border between Cieszyn and Český Těšín

The river flows through the territory of Istebna in Poland, then crosses the Czech- Polish border and flows through territories of Bukovec, Písek, Jablunkov, Návsí, Hrádek, Bystřice, Vendryně, Třinec and Český Těšín. Here it begins to form the state border with Cieszyn, Pogwizdów and Kaczyce on the Polish side and Chotěbuz on the Czech side. The river then continues through the territories of Karviná, Dětmarovice and Petrovice u Karviné before it begins to form the state border again, which lasts until its mouth. In this section, it flows along the territories of Godów and Gorzyce in Poland and Dolní Lutyně and Bohumín in the Czech Republic.

== Bodies of water ==
There are 690 bodies of water in the Czech part of the basin area. The largest of them is the Těrlicko Reservoir with an area of 268 ha (660 acres), built on the Stonávka.

== Culture ==
The river is a symbol of the Trans-Olza region, which lies on its west bank, constituting a part of the western half of the historical region of Cieszyn Silesia. The river is depicted in the words of the unofficial anthem of this region and of local Poles, Płyniesz Olzo po dolinie ("Thou flowest, Olza, down the valley"), written by Jan Kubisz.

== Fauna ==
Protected animals that live in the river include the brook lamprey, schneider, European bullhead and alpine bullhead. River trout and grayling are commonly found in the river. Protected animals that live on the river banks include the Eurasian otter and common kingfisher.

== Tourism ==
The Olza is suitable for river tourism. The river is navigable for most of the year. Most of the river is suitable even for less experienced paddlers.

== See also ==
- List of rivers of the Czech Republic
- List of rivers of Poland
