= List of places in Cieszyn Silesia =

This is a list of the Polish, Czech and German names of places in Cieszyn Silesia (Czech: Těšínské Slezsko, Polish: Śląsk Cieszyński, German: Teschener Schlesien).

Polish	Czech	German
Olbrachcice	Albrechtice	Albersdorf
Aleksandrowice	Alexandrovice	Alexanderfeld
Bąków	Bonkov	Bonkau
Bartowice	Bartovice	Bartelsdorf
Baszka	Baška	Baschka
Bażanowice	Bažanovice	Bazanowitz
Bielowicko	Bělovicko	Bielowitzko
Bielsko	Bílsko	Bielitz
Biery	Běry	Bierau
Bładnice	Blatnice	Bladnitz
Błogocice	Blahotice	Blogotzitz
Bobrek	Bobrky	Bobrek
Boconowice	Bocanovice	Boconowitz
Bogumin	Bohumín	Oderberg
Boguszowice	Bohušovice	Boguschowitz
Brenna	Brenná	Brenna
Bronów	Brúnov	Braunau
Bruzowice	Bruzovice	Brusowitz
Brzezówka	Březůvka	Brzezuwka
Bukowiec	Bukovec	Bukowetz
Bystra Śląska	Bystrá	Bistrai
Bystrzyca	Bystřice	Bistrzitz
Kocobędz	Chotěbuz	Kotzobendz
Chybie	Chyby	Chybi
Cieszyn	Těšín	Teschen
Cisownica	Tisovnice	Zeislowitz
Czechowice-Dziedzice	Čechovice-Dědice	Tschechowitz-Dzieditz
Czeski Cieszyn	Český Těšín	Tschechisch-Teschen
Darków	Darkov	Darkau
Dębowiec	Dubovec	Baumgarten
Dziećmorowice	Dětmarovice	Dittmannsdorf
Dobra	Dobrá	Dobrau, Guttenland
Dobracice	Dobratice	Dobratitz
Błędowice Dolne	Dolní Bludovice	Nieder-Bludowitz
Datynie Dolne	Dolní Datyně	Nieder-Dattin
Domasłowice Dolne	Dolní Domaslavice	Nieder-Domaslowitz
Leszna Dolna	Dolní Líštná	Nieder-Lischna
Łomna Dolna	Dolní Lomná	Nieder-Lomna
Lutynia Dolna	Dolní Lutyně	Deutschleuten
Marklowice Dolne	Dolní Marklovice	Nieder-Marklowitz
Sucha Dolna	Dolní Suchá	Nieder-Suchau
Toszonowice Dolne	Dolní Tošanovice	Nieder-Toschonowitz
Żuków Dolny	Dolní Žukov	Nieder-Zukau
Kopalnie	Doly	Karwin
Dąbrowa	Doubrava	Dombrau
Drogomyśl	Drahomyšl	Drahomischl
Dzięgielów	Děhylov	Dzingelau
Frelichów	Frelichov	Fröhlichhof
Frydek	Frýdek	Friedeck
Frysztat	Fryštát	Freistadt
Godziszów	Hodišov	Godzischau
Goleszów	Holešov	Golleschau
Górki Małe	Malé Hůrky	Klein-Gurek
Górki Wielkie	Velké Hůrky	Groß-Gurek
Grodziec	Hradec	Grodzietz
Gułdowy	Kuldov	Guldau
Gumna	Humna	Gumna
Guty	Guty	Gutty
Harbutowice	Harbutovice	Harbutowitz
Hawierzów	Havířov	
Hażlach	Hažlach / Hazlach	Haslach
Hermanice, Ustroń	Heřmanice	Hermanitz
Hermanice	Heřmanice (Ostrava)	Herzmanitz
Gnojnik	Hnojník	Hnojnik
Błędowice Górne	Horní Bludovice	Ober-Bludowitz
Domasłowice Górne	Horní Domaslavice	Ober-Domaslowitz
Leszna Górna	Horní Líštná	Ober-Lischna
Lipowiec, Ustroń	Lipovec	Lippowetz
Łomna Górna	Horní Lomná	Ober-Lomna
Sucha Górna	Horní Suchá	Ober-Suchau
Toszonowice Górne	Horní Tošanovice	Ober-Toschonowitz
Żuków Górny	Horní Žukov	Ober-Zukau
Gródek	Hrádek	Grudek
Grodziszcz	Hradiště	Grodischcz
Hrczawa or Herczawa	Hrčava	Hertschawa
Gruszów	Hrušov	Hruschau
Iłownica	Jilovnice	Illownitz
Iskrzyczyn	Jiskřičín	Iskrzyczyn
Istebna	Jistebná	Istebna
Jabłonków	Jablunkov	Jablunkau
Janowice	Janovice	Janowitz
Jasienica	Jasenice	Heinzendorf
Jaworze	Javoří	Ernsdorf
Jaworzynka	Javořinka	Jaworzinka
Kaczyce	Kačice	Katschitz
Kalembice	Kalubice	Kalembitz
Kamienica	Kamenice	Kamitz
Kaniowice	Kaňovice	Kaniowitz
Karpętna	Karpentná	Karpentna
Karwina	Karviná	Karwin
Kiczyce	Kyčice	Kitschitz
Kisielów	Kyselov	Kisielau
Kojkowice	Kojkovice	Kojkowitz
Komorowice Śląskie	Komorovice	Batzdorf
Ligotka Kameralna	Komorní Lhotka	Kameral-Ellgoth
Koniaków	Koňákov	Koniakau
Koniaków	Koňákov	Konakau
Kończyce Małe	Malé Kunčice	Klein-Kuntschitz
Kończyce Wielkie	Velké Kunčice	Groß-Kuntschitz
Końska	Konská	Konskau
Kopytów	Kopytov	Kopitau
Kostkowice	Kostkovice	Kostkowitz
Koszarzyska	Košařiska	Koszarzisk
Kowale	Kovále / Kovály	Kowali
Kozakowice	Kozákovice	Kozakowitz
Krasna	Krásná	Krasna
Krasna	Krásná	Krasna
Kończyce Wielkie	Kunčice	Gross Kunzendorf
Kończyce Małe	Kunčičky	Klein Kuntschitz
Łączka	Loučka	Lonczka
Landek	Landek	Landek
Łazy	Lazy (Orlová)	Lazy
Łazy, Bielsko County	Lazy	Lazy
Leszna Górna	Horní Líštná	Ober-Lischna
Ligota	Lhota	Ellgoth
Lipowiec	Lipovec	Lippowetz
Liskowiec	Lískovec	Leskowetz
Łąki nad Olzą	Louky nad Olší	Lonkau
Łyżbice	Lyžbice	Lischbitz
Malenowice	Malenovice	Malenowitz
Marklowice	Marklovice	Marklowitz
Marklowice Górne	Horní Marklovice	Ober-Marklowitz
Mazańcowice	Mazančovice	Matzdorf
Michałkowice	Michálkovice	Michalkowitz
Międzyświeć	Mezisvětí	Miendzyswietz
Mikuszowice Śląskie	Mikušovice	Nikelsdorf
Milików	Milíkov	Millikau
Mistrzowice	Mistřovice	Mistrzowitz
Mizerów	Mizerov	Miserau
Mnich	Mnich	Mnich
Mnisztwo	Mníšek / Mnichy	Mönichhof
Morawka	Morávka	Morawka
Mosty koło Cieszyna	Mosty u Českého Těšína	Mosty
Mosty koło Jabłonkowa	Mosty u Jablunkova	Mosty
Muglinów	Muglinov	Muglinau
Nawsie	Návsí	Nawsi
Niebory	Nebory	Niebory
Nierodzim	Nerodim	Nierodzim
Noszowice	Nošovice	Noschowitz
Nowe Miasto	Nové Město	Neustadtl
Nydek	Nýdek	Niedek
Ochaby	Ochaby	Ochab
Ogrodzona	Ohrazená	Ogrodzon
Oldrzychowice	Oldřichovice	Oldrzychowitz
Orłowa	Orlová	Orlau
Pastwiska	Pastviska	Pastwisk
Październa	Pazderna	Pazdierna
Piotrowice koło Karwiny	Petrovice u Karviné	Petrowitz
Pietwałd	Petřvald	Peterswald
Piersna	Prstná	Piersna
Pierściec	Prstec	Perstetz
Pioseczna	Písečná	Pioseczna
Piosek	Písek	Piosek
Pogórze	Pohoří	Pogorz
Pogwizdów	Pohvizdov	Pogwisdau
Poręba	Poruba	Poremba
Prażmo	Pražmo	Praschmo
Pruchna	Pruchná	Pruchna
Pudłów	Pudlov	Pudlau
Puńców	Puncov	Punzau
Radwanice	Radvanice	Radwanitz
Raj	Ráj	Roj
Raszkowice	Raškovice	Raschkowitz
Rzeka	Řeka	Rzeka
Ropica	Ropice	Roppitz
Roztropice	Roztropice / Rostropice	Rostropitz
Rudnik	Rudník	Rudnik
Rudzica	Rudice	Riegersdorf
Rychwałd	Rychvald	Reichwaldau
Rzepiszcze	Řepiště	Rzepischt
Siedliszcze	Sedliště	Sedlischt
Szonów	Šenov	Schönhof
Simoradz	Semorad	Schimoradz
Skalica	Skalice	Skalitz
Skoczów	Skočov	Skotschau
Skrzeczoń	Skřečoň	Skrzeczon
Śląska Ostrawa	Slezská Ostrava (Note: Slezská Ostrava was known until 1919 in Czech as Polská Ostrava, in Polish as Polska Ostrawa.)	Polnisch Ostrau
Śmiłowice	Smilovice	Smilowitz
Sobieszowice / Szobiszowice	Soběšovice	Schöbischowitz
Solca	Solca	Solza
Stanisławice	Stanislavice	Stanislowitz
Stare Hamry	Staré Hamry	Althammer
Stare Bielsko	Staré Bílsko	Alt Bielitz
Stare Miasto	Staré Město (Frýdek-Místek District)	Altstadt
Stare Miasto	Staré Město (Karviná)	Altstadt
Stare Miasto	Staré Město (Třinec)	Altstadt
Stonawa	Stonava	Steinau
Sucha Średnia	Prostřední Suchá	Mittel-Suchau
Trzycież	Střítež	Trzytiesch
Strumień	Strumeň	Schwarzwasser
Szonychel	Šunychl	Schönichel
Świętoszówka	Svěntošůvka	Swientoszuwka
Szumbark	Šumbark	Schumbarg
Sibica	Svibice	Schibitz
Cierlicko	Těrlicko	Tierlitzko
Trzanowice	Třanovice	Trzanowitz
Trzyniec	Třinec	Trzynietz
Tyra	Tyra	Tyra
Ustroń	Ustroň / Ústraní / Ústráň	Ustron
Wapienica	Vápenice	Lobnitz
Więcłowice	Václavovice	Wenzlowitz
Wielopole	Vělopolí	Wielopoli
Wędrynia	Vendryně	Wendrin
Wierzniowice	Věřňovice	Willmersdorf
Wojkowice	Vojkovice	Wojkowitz
Racimów	Vratimov	Rattimau
Wierzbica	Vrbice	Wirbitz
Wieszczęta	Věščút	Wieszczont
Wilamowice	Vilémovice	Willamowitz
Wisła	Visla	Weichsel
Wiślica	Vislice	Wislitz
Zabłocie	Záblatí	Zablacz
Zabłocie	Záblatí	Zablacz
Zaborze	Záboří	Zaborz
Zabrzeg	Zábřeh	Zabrzeg
Zamarski	Zámrsk	Zamarsk
Zarzecze	Záříčí	Zarzicz
Zawada	Závada	Zawada
Zbytków	Zbytky / Zbytkov	Zbitkau
Zebrzydowice	Žibřidovice	Seibersdorf
Żermanice	Žermanice	Zermanitz, Schermanitz, Zilmanitz
Żywocice	Životice	Zywotitz

== See also ==
- List of European exonyms
- Polish minority in the Czech Republic
- Trans-Olza
