= Pierściec =

- Village
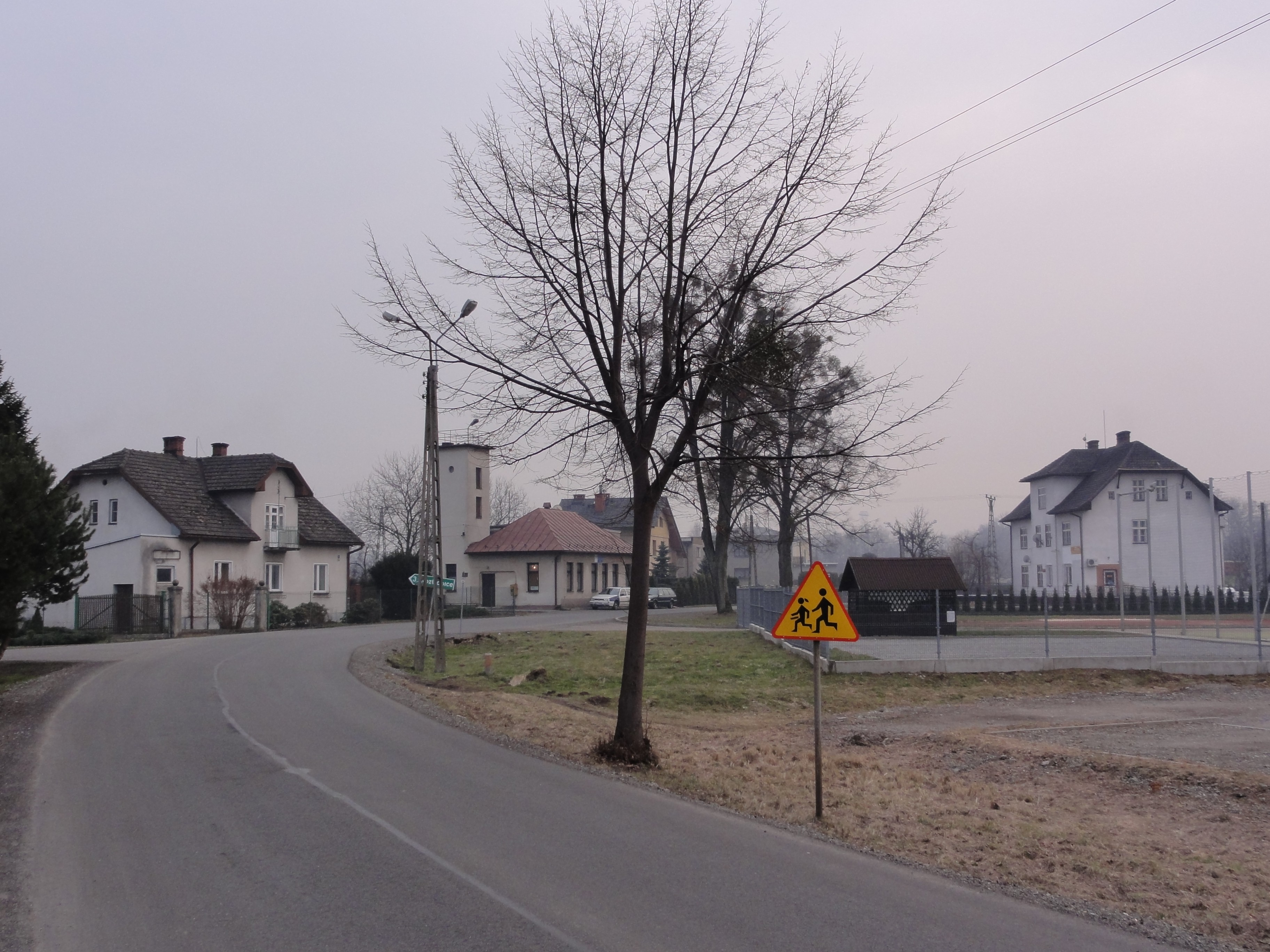
- Village's centre

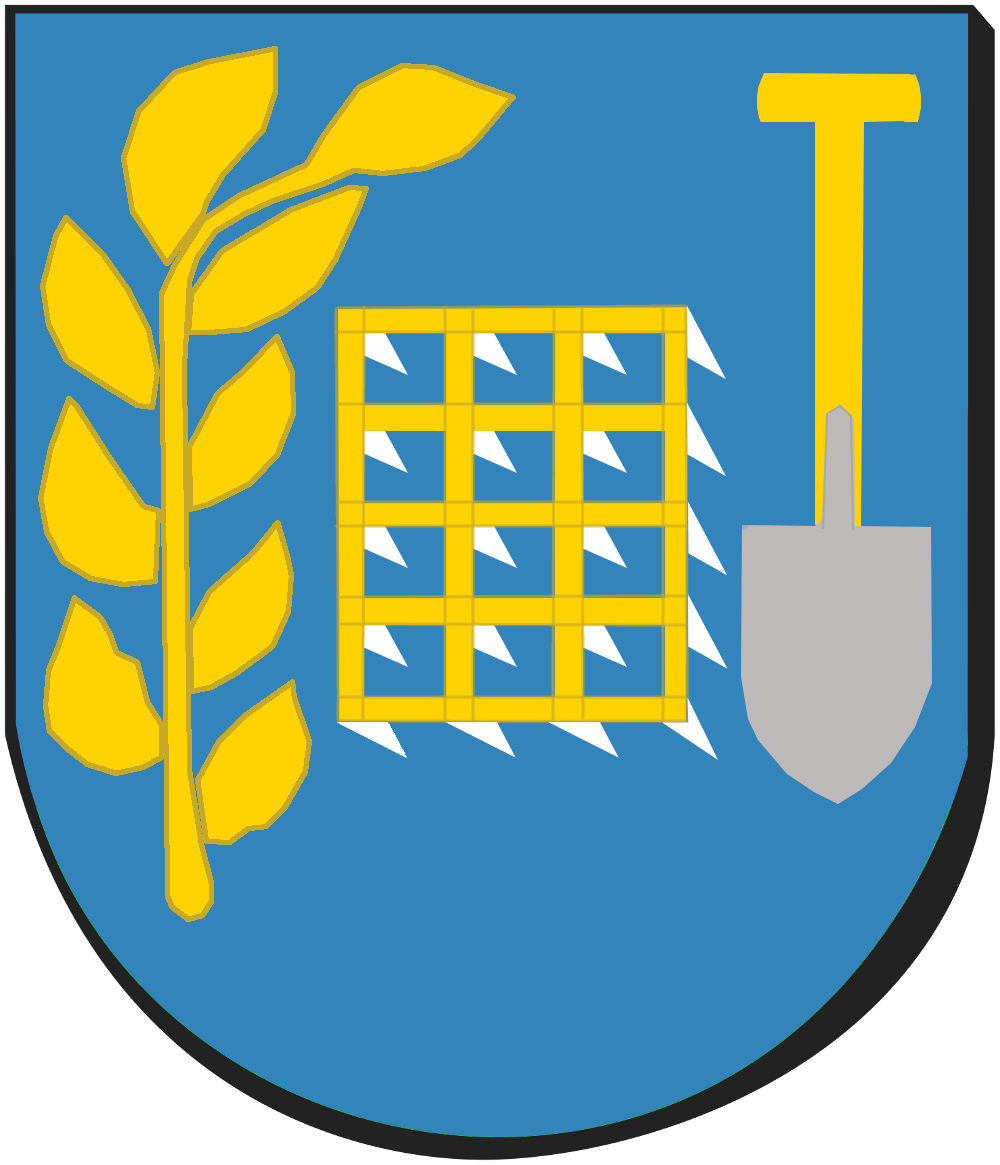
- Coat of arms

- Location within Poland
- Coordinates: 49°49′52.62″N 18°49′22.35″E
- Country: Poland
- Voivodeship: Silesian
- County: Cieszyn
- Gmina: Skoczów
- First mentioned: 1550

Government
  - Mayor: Monika Szyndler

Area
  - Total: 7.09 km^{2} (2.74 sq mi)

Population (2016)
  - Total: 1,918
  - Density: 271/km^{2} (701/sq mi)
- Time zone: UTC+1 (CET)
  - Summer (DST): UTC+2 (CEST)
- Postal code: 43-430
- Car plates: SCI

Pierściec is a village in Gmina Skoczów, Cieszyn County, Silesian Voivodeship, southern Poland. It lies in the historical region of Cieszyn Silesia.

== History ==
It was first mentioned in 1550 as Perstczy, with a strong indication that it was much older. Politically the village belonged then to the Duchy of Teschen, formed in 1290 in the process of feudal fragmentation of Poland and was ruled by a local branch of Piast dynasty. In 1327 the duchy became a fee of the Kingdom of Bohemia, which after 1526 became part of the Habsburg monarchy.

After the 1540s Protestant Reformation prevailed in the Duchy of Teschen and a local Catholic church was taken over by Lutherans. It was taken from them (as one from around fifty buildings in the region) by a special commission and given back to the Roman Catholic Church on 15 April 1654.

After Revolutions of 1848 in the Austrian Empire a modern municipal division was introduced in the re-established Austrian Silesia. The village as a municipality was subscribed to the political district of Bielsko and the legal district of Skoczów. According to the censuses conducted in 1880, 1890, 1900 and 1910 the population of the municipality dropped from 574 in 1880 to 539 in 1910 with a majority being native Polish-speakers (95.1%-98.3%) and a small German-speaking minority (most 27 or 4.7% in 1880) and at most 2 Czech-speaking persons, in terms of religion majority were Roman Catholics (66.8% in 1910), followed by Protestants (31.2% in 1910) and Jews (11 or 2% in 1910). The village was also traditionally inhabited by Cieszyn Vlachs, speaking Cieszyn Silesian dialect.

After World War I, fall of Austria-Hungary, Polish–Czechoslovak War and the division of Cieszyn Silesia in 1920, it became a part of Poland. It was then annexed by Nazi Germany at the beginning of World War II. After the war it was restored to Poland.

== People ==
- Tadeusz Kopeć, Polish politician, was born here.
