= Wislica (disambiguation) =

Wiślica is a village in Busko County, Świętokrzyskie Voivodeship, in south-central Poland

Wiślica or Wislica may also refer to:

- Wiślica, Silesian Voivodeship, a village in Gmina Skoczów, Cieszyn County, Silesian Voivodeship, southern Poland
- Wiślica, Kielce Voivodeship, a former village in central Poland
- Gmina Wiślica, a rural gmina (administrative district) in Busko County, Świętokrzyskie Voivodeship
- Wiślica County, an administrative unit of the Kingdom of Poland
- Vislitsa River, a river in Dnieper basin, in Brest Oblast, Belarus
