= Harbutowice, Silesian Voivodeship =

Harbutowice
- Village
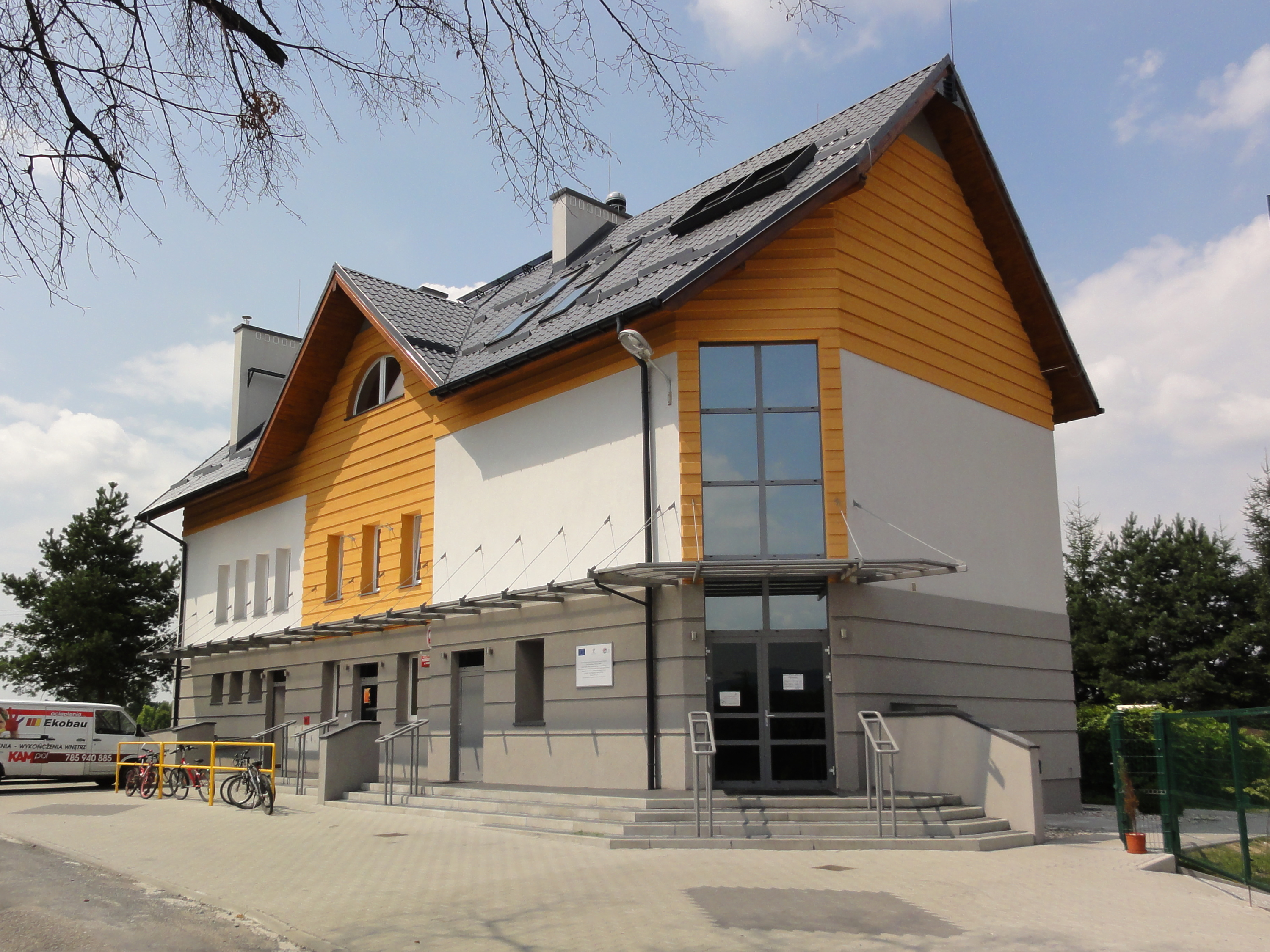
- Community center and kindergarten

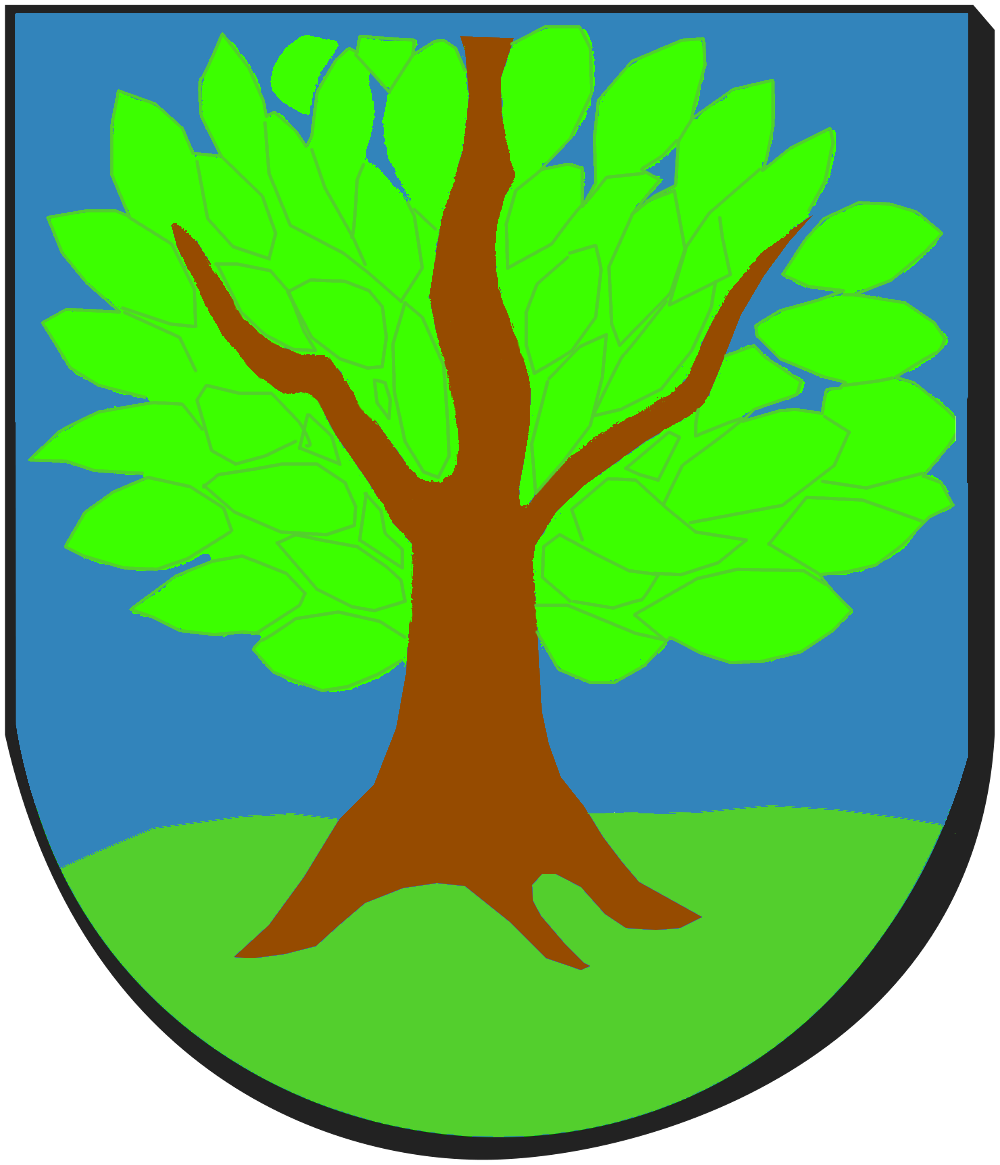
- Coat of arms

- Location within Poland
- Coordinates: 49°46′38.84″N 18°48′25.72″E
- Country: Poland
- Voivodeship: Silesian
- County: Cieszyn
- Gmina: Skoczów
- First mentioned: 1521

Government
  - Mayor: Halina Romańska

Area
  - Total: 1.77 km^{2} (0.68 sq mi)

Population (2016)
  - Total: 883
  - Density: 499/km^{2} (1,290/sq mi)
- Time zone: UTC+1 (CET)
  - Summer (DST): UTC+2 (CEST)
- Postal code: 43-430
- Car plates: SCI

Harbutowice is a village in Gmina Skoczów, Cieszyn County, Silesian Voivodeship, southern Poland. It lies in the historical region of Cieszyn Silesia.

== History ==
The village was first mentioned in 1448 as Harburtowicz[e]. Politically the village belonged then to the Duchy of Teschen, a fee of the Kingdom of Bohemia, which after 1526 became part of the Habsburg monarchy.

After Revolutions of 1848 in the Austrian Empire a modern municipal division was introduced in the re-established Austrian Silesia. The village as a municipality was subscribed to the political district of Bielsko and the legal district of Skoczów. According to the censuses conducted in 1880, 1890, 1900 and 1910 the population of the municipality grew from 361 in 1880 to 369 in 1910, with majority of the inhabitants being native Polish-speakers (96.5–98.9%) and minority German-speaking (most 3.5% in 1900), with a slight majority of Roman Catholics (51% in 1910), followed by Protestants (46.1% in 1910) and Jews (11 people). The village was also traditionally inhabited by Cieszyn Vlachs, speaking Cieszyn Silesian dialect.

After World War I, fall of Austria-Hungary, Polish–Czechoslovak War and the division of Cieszyn Silesia in 1920, it became a part of Poland. It was then annexed by Nazi Germany at the beginning of World War II. After the war it was restored to Poland.
