= Wilamowice, Cieszyn County =

Wilamowice
- Village
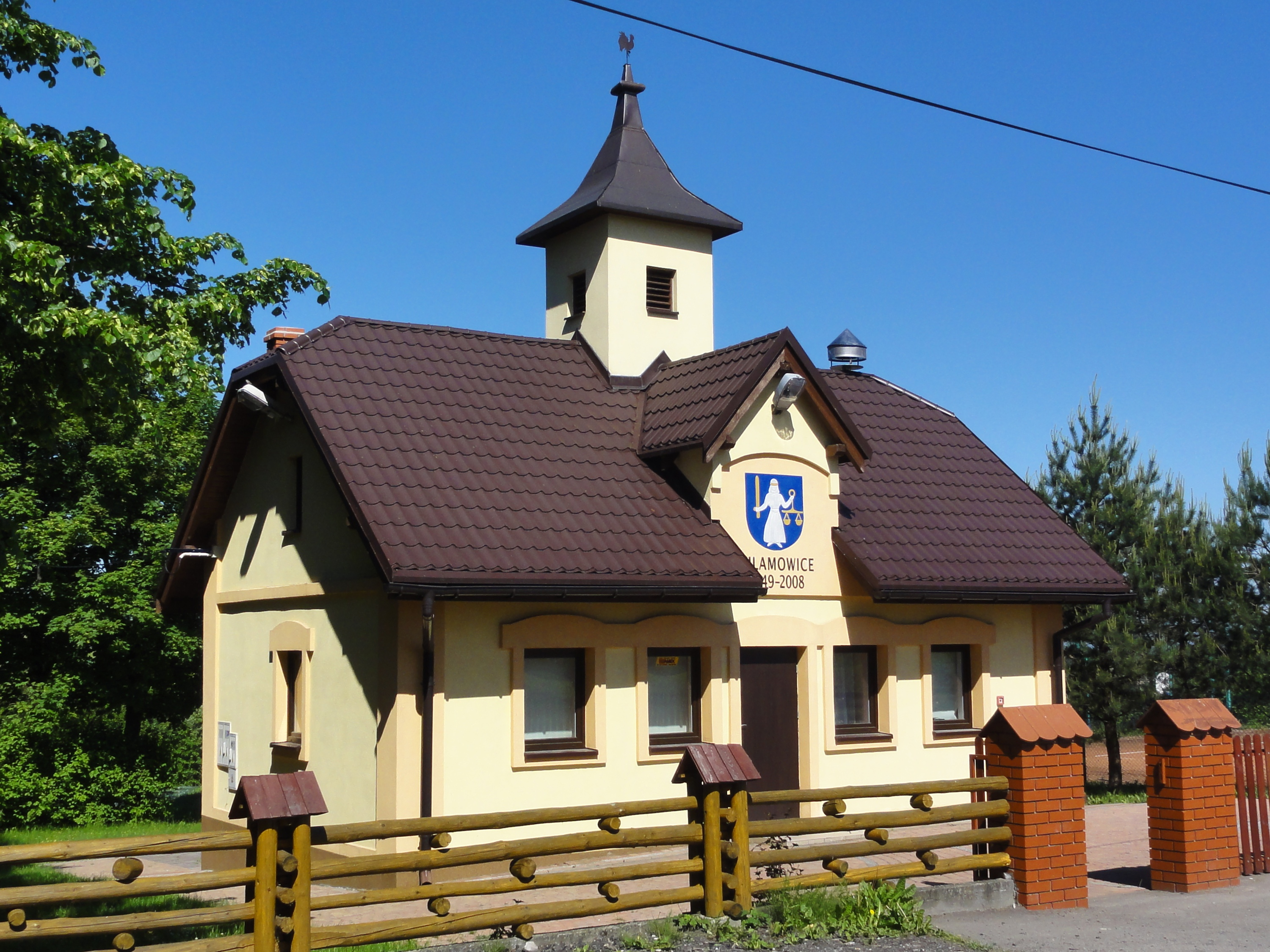
- Fire department in Wilamowice

- Coat of arms

- Location within Poland
- Coordinates: 49°47′27.42″N 18°45′42.51″E
- Country: Poland
- Voivodeship: Silesian
- County: Cieszyn
- Gmina: Skoczów
- First mentioned: 1331

Government
  - Mayor: Ryszard Drózd

Area
  - Total: 278 km^{2} (107 sq mi)

Population (2016)
  - Total: 543
  - Density: 1.95/km^{2} (5.06/sq mi)
- Time zone: UTC+1 (CET)
  - Summer (DST): UTC+2 (CEST)
- Postal code: 43-430
- Car plates: SCI

Wilamowice [vilamɔˈvit͡sɛ] is a village in Gmina Skoczów, Cieszyn County, Silesian Voivodeship, southern Poland. It lies on south-western slopes of Górka Wilamowicka (388 m above mean sea level) in Silesian Foothills, in the historical region of Cieszyn Silesia.

== History ==
The village was first mentioned in 1331 as Willamowitz. Politically the village belonged then to the Duchy of Teschen, formed in 1290 in the process of feudal fragmentation of Poland and was ruled by a local branch of Piast dynasty. In 1327 the duchy became a fee of the Kingdom of Bohemia, which after 1526 became part of the Habsburg monarchy.

After Revolutions of 1848 in the Austrian Empire a modern municipal division was introduced in the re-established Austrian Silesia. The village as a municipality was subscribed to the political district of Bielsko and the legal district of Skoczów. According to the censuses conducted in 1880, 1890, 1900 and 1910 the population of the municipality dropped from 189 in 1880 to 178 in 1910 with a majority being native Polish-speakers (90.9%-99%) and a small minority German-speaking (at most 15 or 8.4% in 1910) and Czech-speaking (at most 7 or 3.7% in 1890), in terms of religion majority were Protestants (74% in 1910), followed by Roman Catholics (25.8% in 1910) and 2 Jews. The village was also traditionally inhabited by Cieszyn Vlachs, speaking Cieszyn Silesian dialect.

After World War I, fall of Austria-Hungary, Polish–Czechoslovak War and the division of Cieszyn Silesia in 1920, it became a part of Poland. It was then annexed by Nazi Germany at the beginning of World War II. After the war it was restored to Poland.
