= Pogórze, Silesian Voivodeship =

Pogórze
- Village
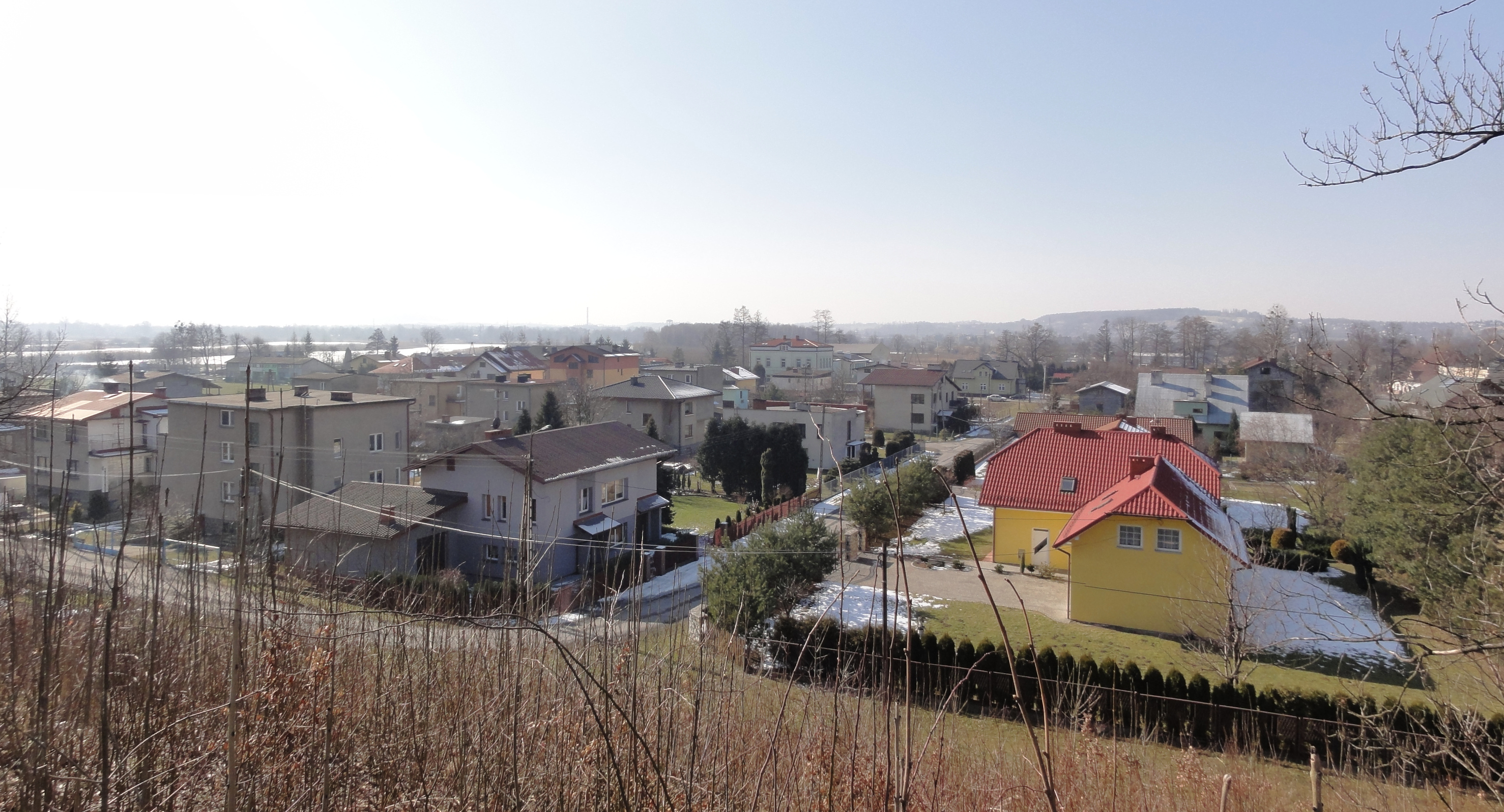
- Village's centre

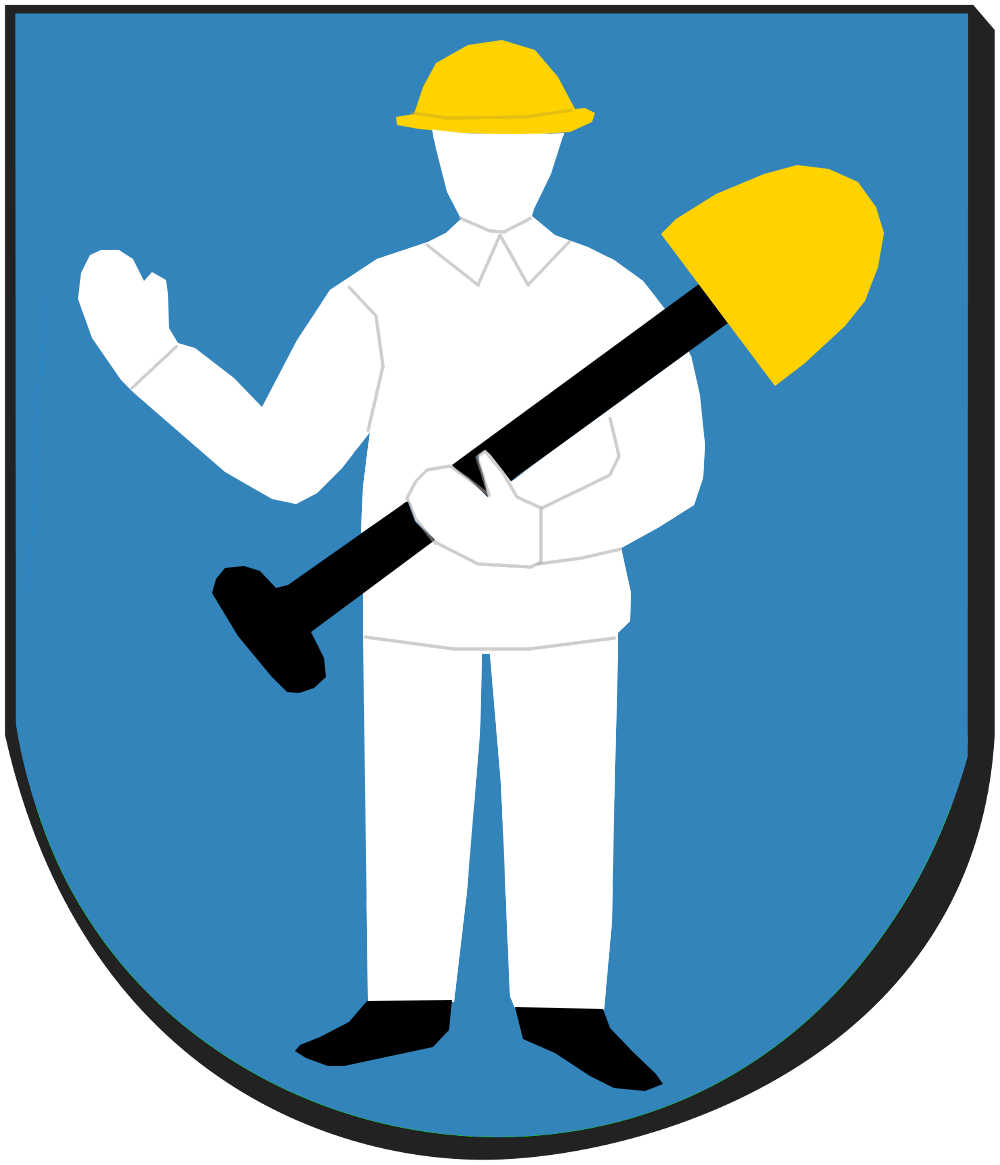
- Coat of arms

- Location within Poland
- Coordinates: 49°48′7.76″N 18°49′16.65″E
- Country: Poland
- Voivodeship: Silesian
- County: Cieszyn
- Gmina: Skoczów
- First mentioned: 1305

Government
  - Mayor: Mariusz Rodenko

Area
  - Total: 8.63 km^{2} (3.33 sq mi)

Population (2016)
  - Total: 1,972
  - Density: 229/km^{2} (592/sq mi)
- Time zone: UTC+1 (CET)
  - Summer (DST): UTC+2 (CEST)
- Postal code: 43-430
- Car plates: SCI

Pogórze (Czech: Pohoří) is a village in Gmina Skoczów, Cieszyn County, Silesian Voivodeship, southern Poland. It lies in the historical region of Cieszyn Silesia.

== History ==
The village was first mentioned in a Latin document of Diocese of Wrocław called Liber fundationis episcopatus Vratislaviensis from around 1305 as item in Pogorsz. It meant that the village was in the process of location (the size of land to pay a tithe from was not yet precised). The creation of the village was a part of a larger settlement campaign taking place in the late 13th century on the territory of what will be later known as Upper Silesia.

Politically the village belonged initially to the Duchy of Teschen, formed in 1290 in the process of feudal fragmentation of Poland and was ruled by a local branch of Piast dynasty. In 1327 the duchy became a fee of the Kingdom of Bohemia, which after 1526 became part of the Habsburg monarchy.

After Revolutions of 1848 in the Austrian Empire a modern municipal division was introduced in the re-established Austrian Silesia. The village as a municipality was subscribed to the political district of Bielsko and the legal district of Skoczów. According to the censuses conducted in 1880, 1890, 1900 and 1910 the population of the municipality dropped from 890 in 1880 to 862 in 1910 with a majority being native Polish-speakers (92.2%-95.4%) and a growing German-speaking minority (from 41 or 4.6% in 1880 to 61 or 7.1% in 1910) and at most 12 or 1.4% Czech-speaking people (in 1900), in terms of religion majority were Roman Catholics (73.8% in 1910), followed by Protestants (25.2% in 1910) and Jews (9 or 1% in 1910). The village was also traditionally inhabited by Cieszyn Vlachs, speaking Cieszyn Silesian dialect.

After World War I, fall of Austria-Hungary, Polish–Czechoslovak War and the division of Cieszyn Silesia in 1920, it became a part of Poland. It was then annexed by Nazi Germany at the beginning of World War II. After the war it was restored to Poland.
