= Międzyświeć =

- Village
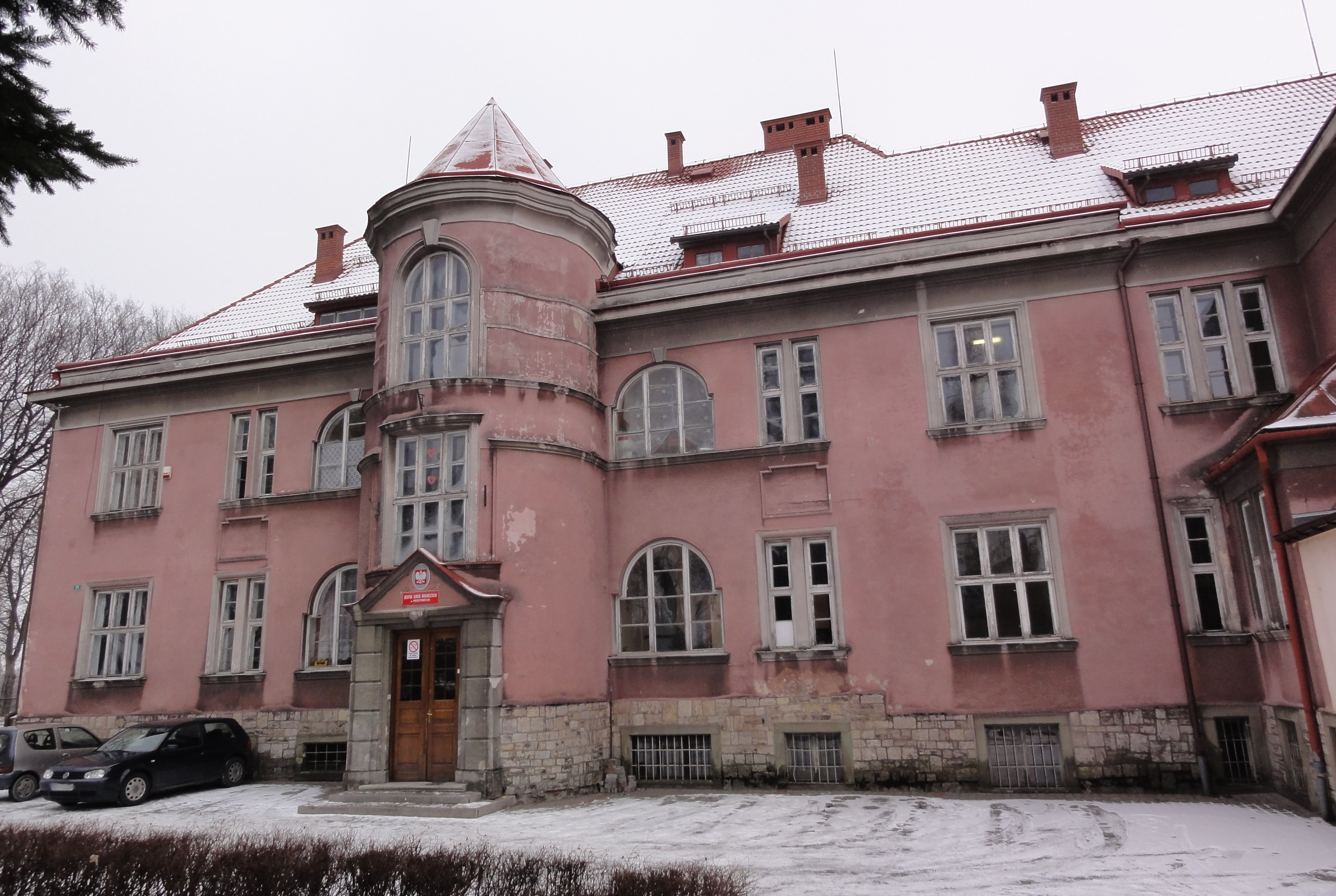
- Agriculture school in Międzyświeć

- Coat of arms

- Location within Poland
- Coordinates: 49°47′17.57″N 18°45′55.24″E
- Country: Poland
- Voivodeship: Silesian
- County: Cieszyn
- Gmina: Skoczów
- First mentioned: 1448

Government
  - Mayor: Stanisław Omorczyk

Area
  - Total: 298 km^{2} (115 sq mi)

Population (2016)
  - Total: 1,081
  - Density: 3.63/km^{2} (9.40/sq mi)
- Time zone: UTC+1 (CET)
  - Summer (DST): UTC+2 (CEST)
- Postal code: 43-430
- Car plates: SCI

Międzyświeć [mjɛnˈd͡zɨɕfjɛt͡ɕ] is a village in Gmina Skoczów, Cieszyn County, Silesian Voivodeship, southern Poland. It lies in the historical region of Cieszyn Silesia.

== History ==
There are remnants of a Slavic gord of the Golensizi tribe in the village. It was established as non-embattled in the 7th century, but in the middle of the 8th century it was girded by a palisade. In the late 9th century the gord was raided and destroyed, most probably by an army of Svatopluk I of Moravia and was not rebuilt afterwards.

The village was first mentioned in 1448 as Mezyschwiety. Politically the village belonged then to the Duchy of Teschen, a fee of the Kingdom of Bohemia, which after 1526 became part of the Habsburg monarchy.

After Revolutions of 1848 in the Austrian Empire a modern municipal division was introduced in the re-established Austrian Silesia. The village as a municipality was subscribed to the political district of Bielsko and the legal district of Skoczów. According to the censuses conducted in 1880, 1890, 1900 and 1910 the population of the municipality dropped from 278 in 1880 to 268 in 1910 with a majority being native Polish-speakers (92.2–97%) and a dwindling Czech-speakin minority (19 or 6.9% in 1880 to zero in 1910) and growing German-speaking (most 21 or 7.8% in 1910), in terms of religion majority were Protestants (56% in 1910), followed by Roman Catholics (41.4% in 1910) and Jews (7 people). The village was also traditionally inhabited by Cieszyn Vlachs, speaking Cieszyn Silesian dialect.

After World War I, fall of Austria-Hungary, Polish–Czechoslovak War and the division of Cieszyn Silesia in 1920, it became a part of Poland. In 1922 a local folwark was transformed into an agriculture school, moved here from Cieszyn. A new building to accommodate it was built in 1927.

The village was annexed by Nazi Germany at the beginning of World War II. After the war it was restored to Poland.
