= Gmina Skoczów =

Gmina Skoczów Skoczów Commune
- Gmina
- Flag Coat of arms

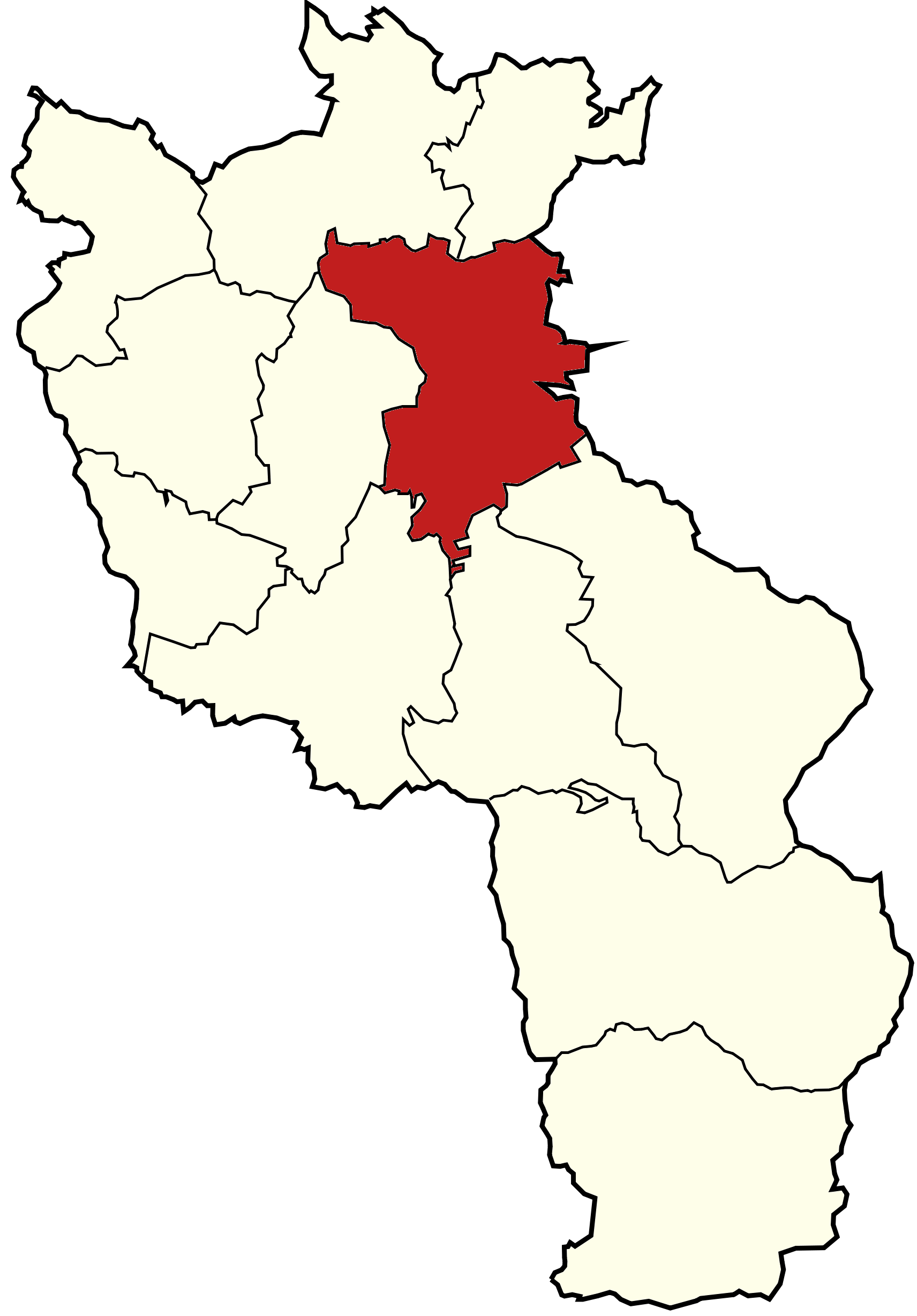
- Gmina Skoczów within the Cieszyn County
- Coordinates (Skoczów): 49°48′3″N 18°47′20″E
- Country: Poland
- Voivodeship: Silesian
- County: Cieszyn
- Seat: Skoczów

Government
  - Mayor: Mirosław Sitko

Area
  - Total: 63.27 km^{2} (24.43 sq mi)

Population (2019-06-30)
  - Total: 26,943
  - Density: 425.8/km^{2} (1,103/sq mi)
  - Urban: 14,385
  - Rural: 12,558
- Website: www.skoczow.pl

Gmina Skoczów is an urban-rural gmina (administrative district) in Cieszyn County, Silesian Voivodeship, in southern Poland, in the historical region of Cieszyn Silesia. Its seat is the town of Skoczów.

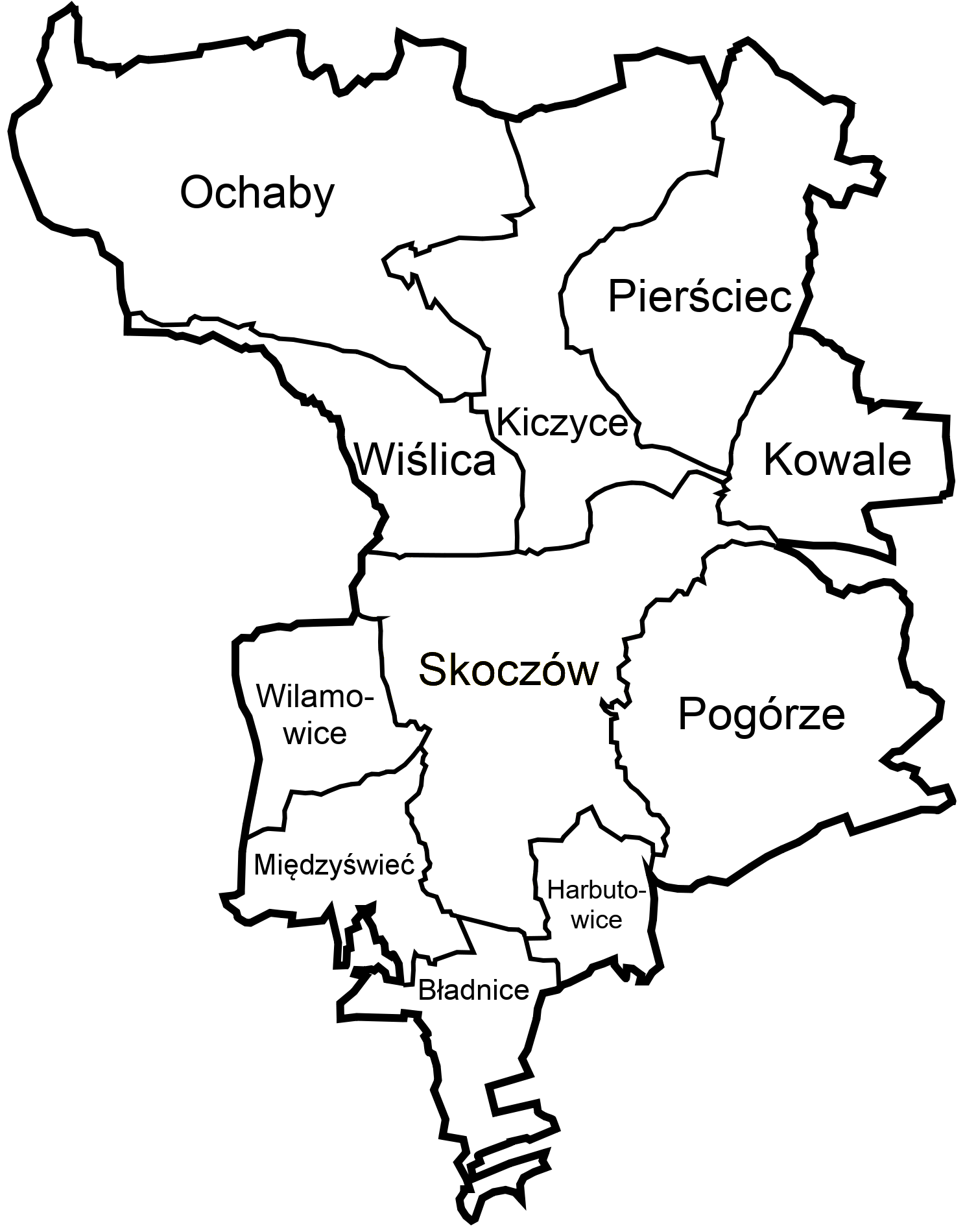
Division of the gmina

The gmina covers an area of 63.27 square kilometres (24.4 sq mi), and as of 2019 its total population is 26,943.

== Villages ==
Skoczów (seat)

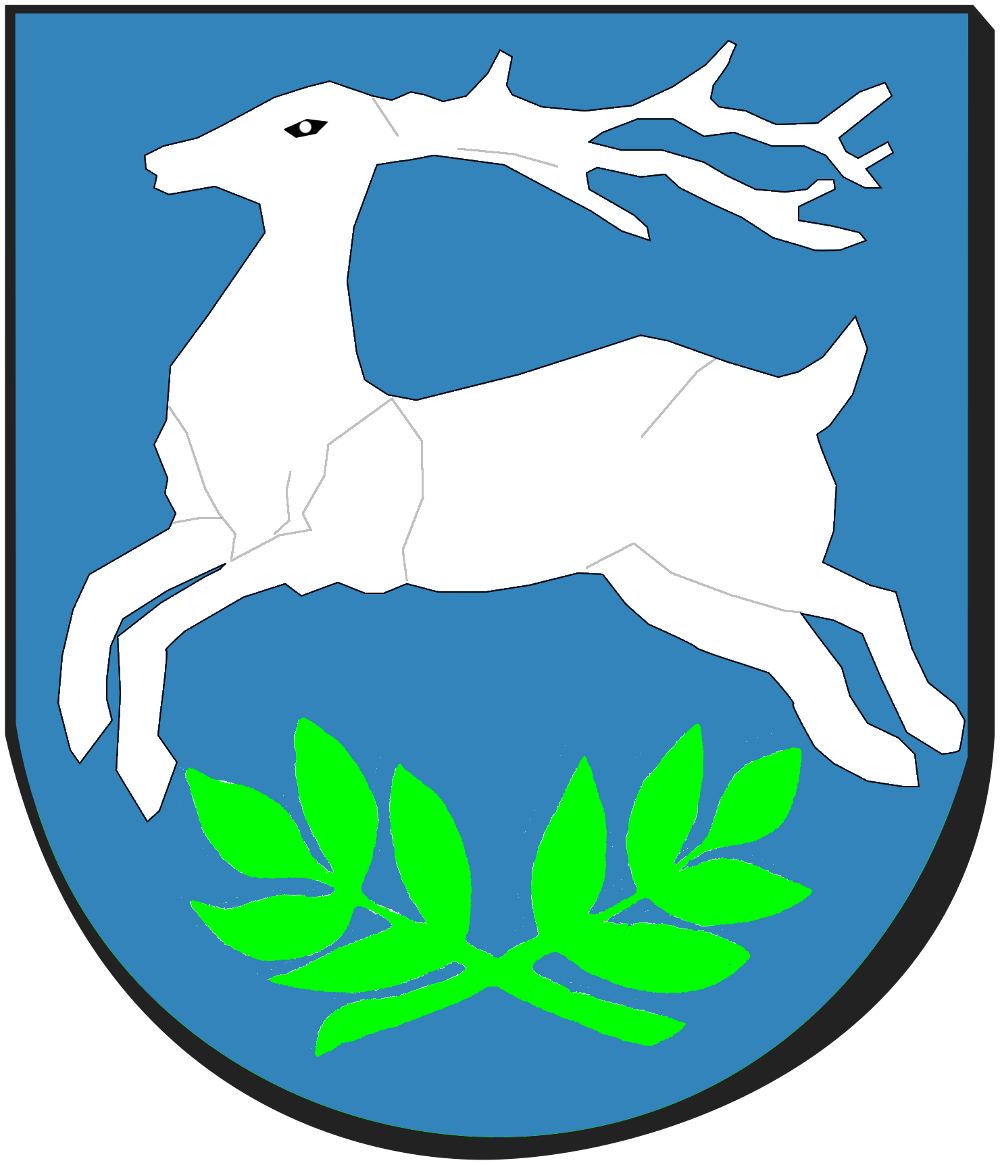
Bładnice*

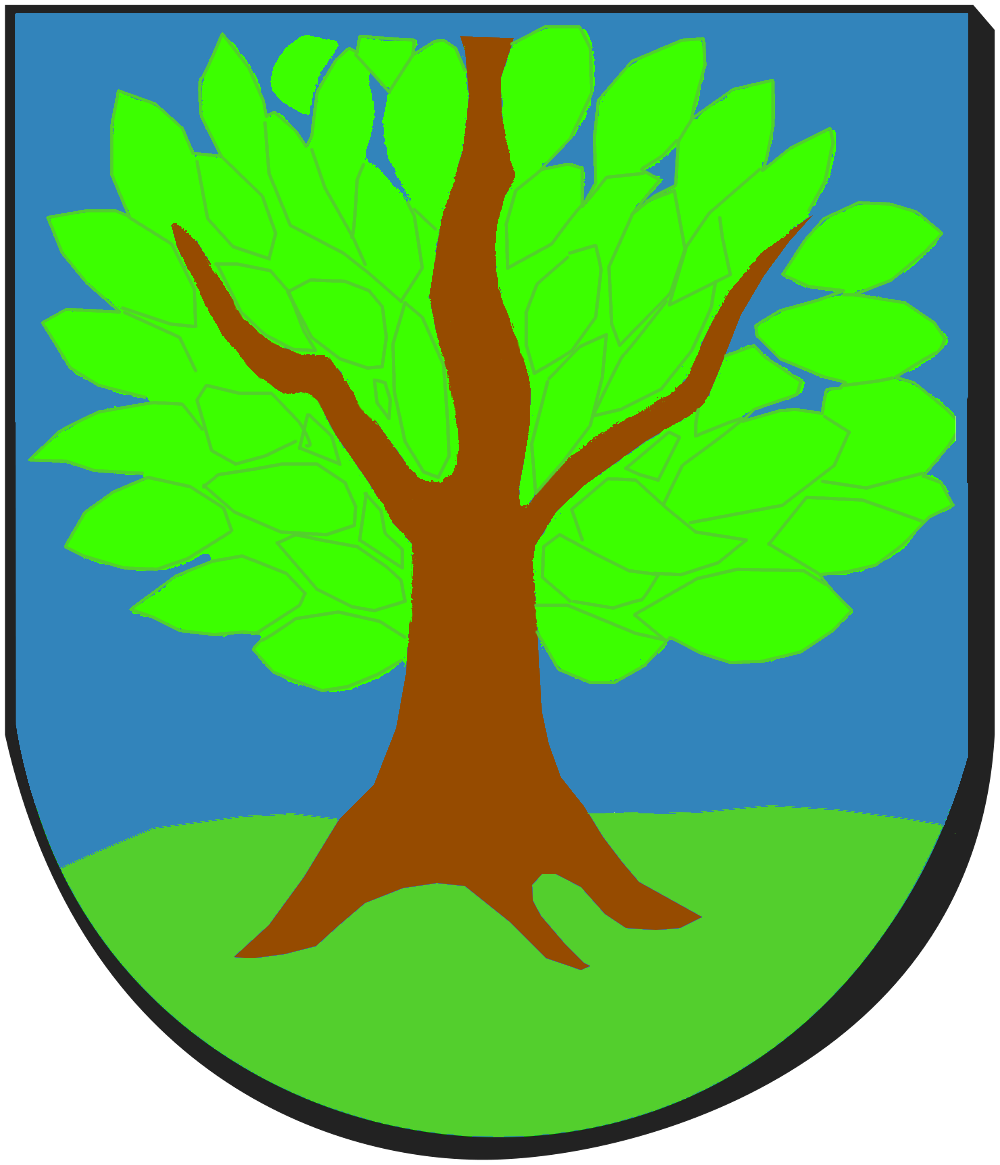
Harbutowice

Kiczyce

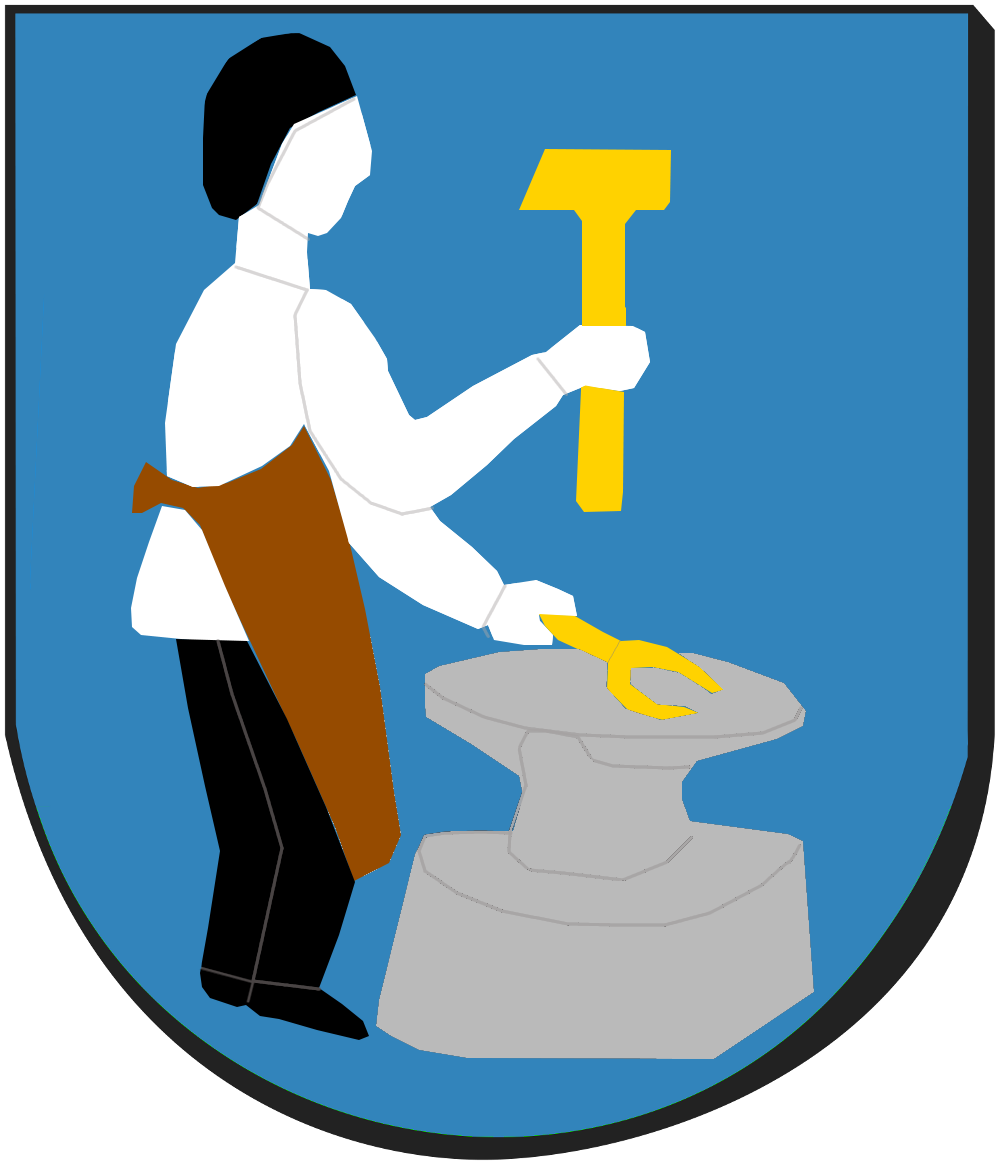
Kowale

Międzyświeć

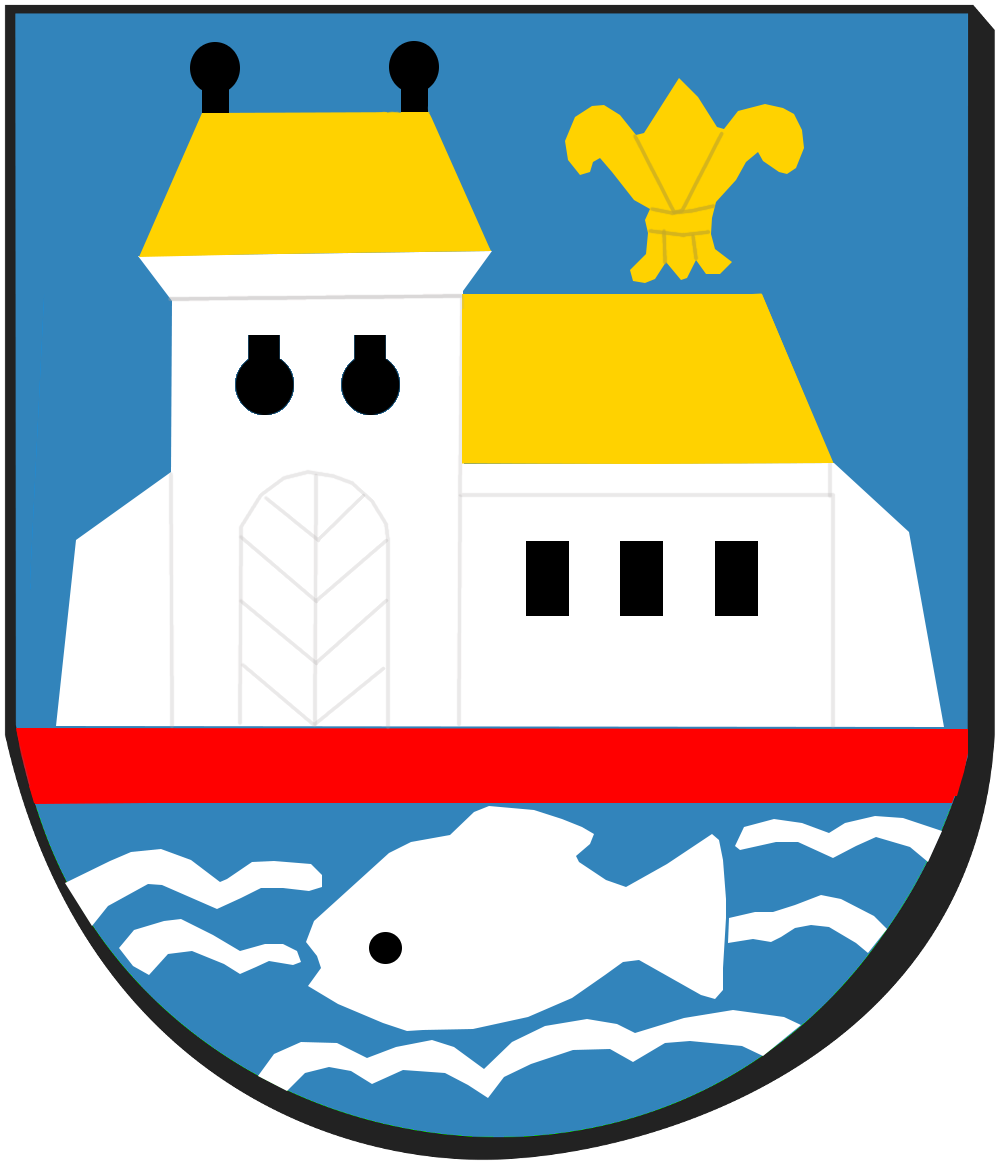
Ochaby*

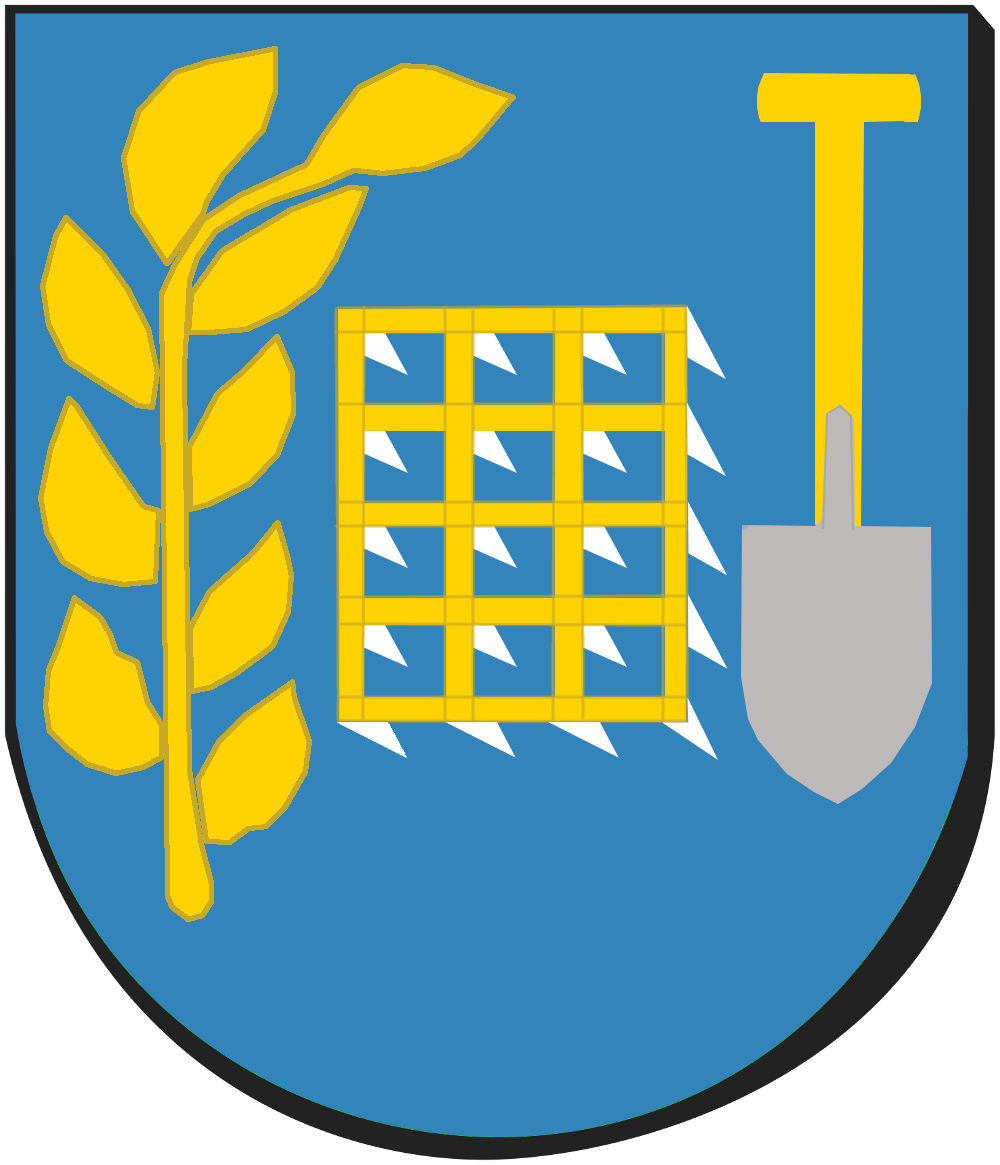
Pierściec

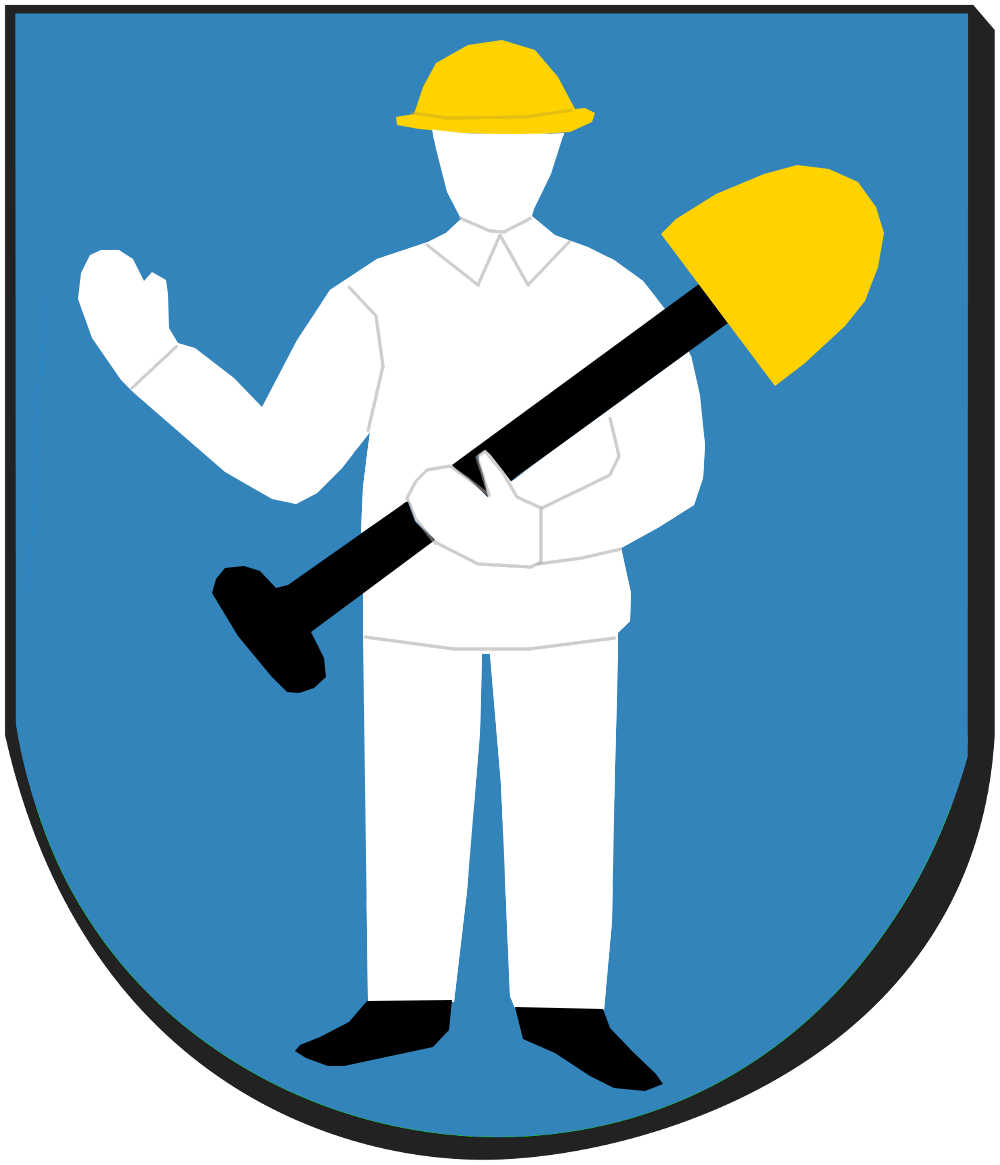
Pogórze

Wilamowice

Wiślica

Bładnice and Ochaby are further subdivided into Dolne (Lower) and Górne (Upper) parts.

== Neighbouring gminas ==
Gmina Skoczów is bordered by the gminas of Brenna, Chybie, Dębowiec, Goleszów, Jasienica, Strumień and Ustroń.

== Twin towns – sister cities ==
Gmina Skoczów is twinned with:

- Hrádek, Czech Republic
