= Kowale, Cieszyn County =

Kowale
- Village
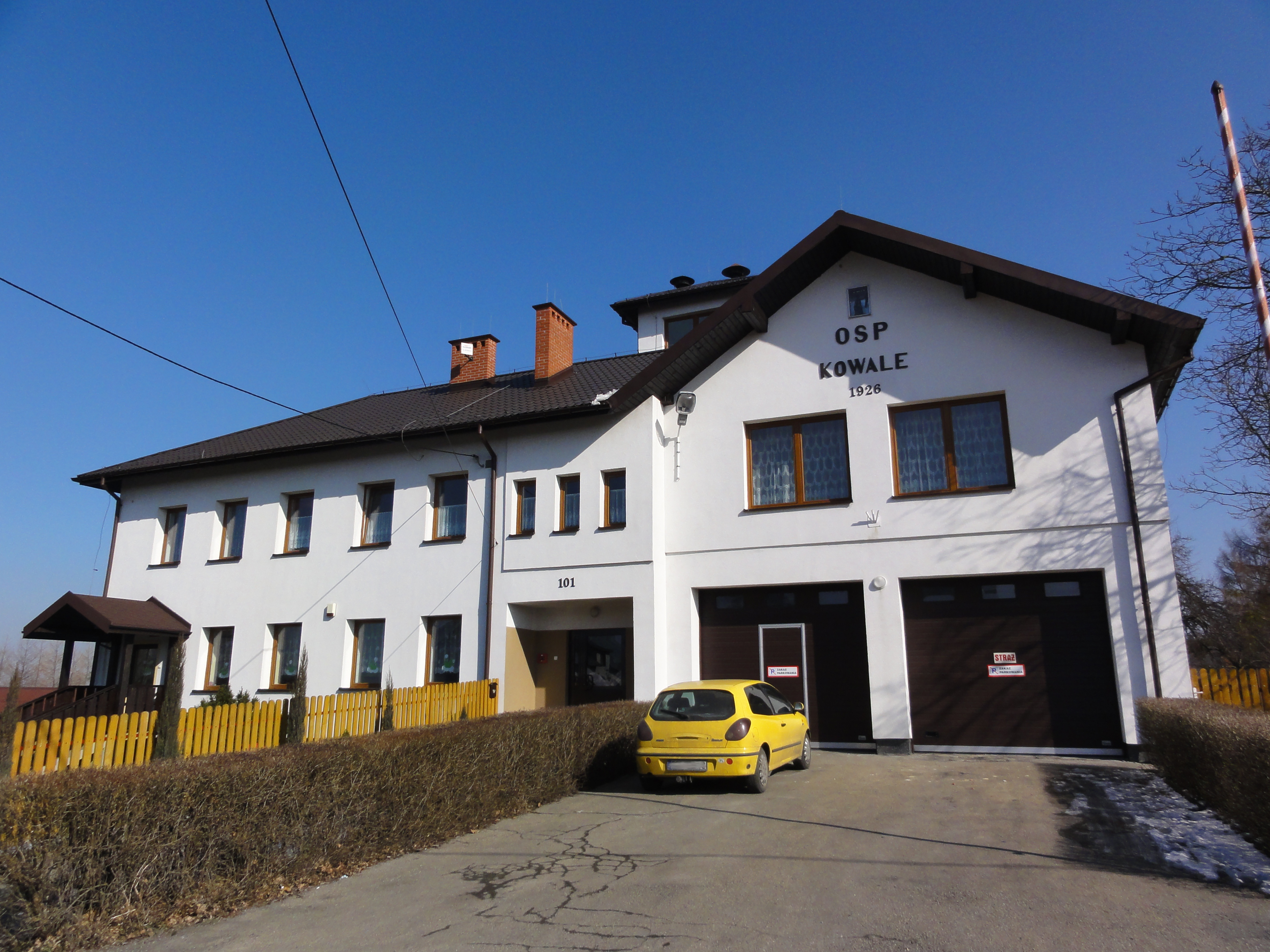
- Fire department

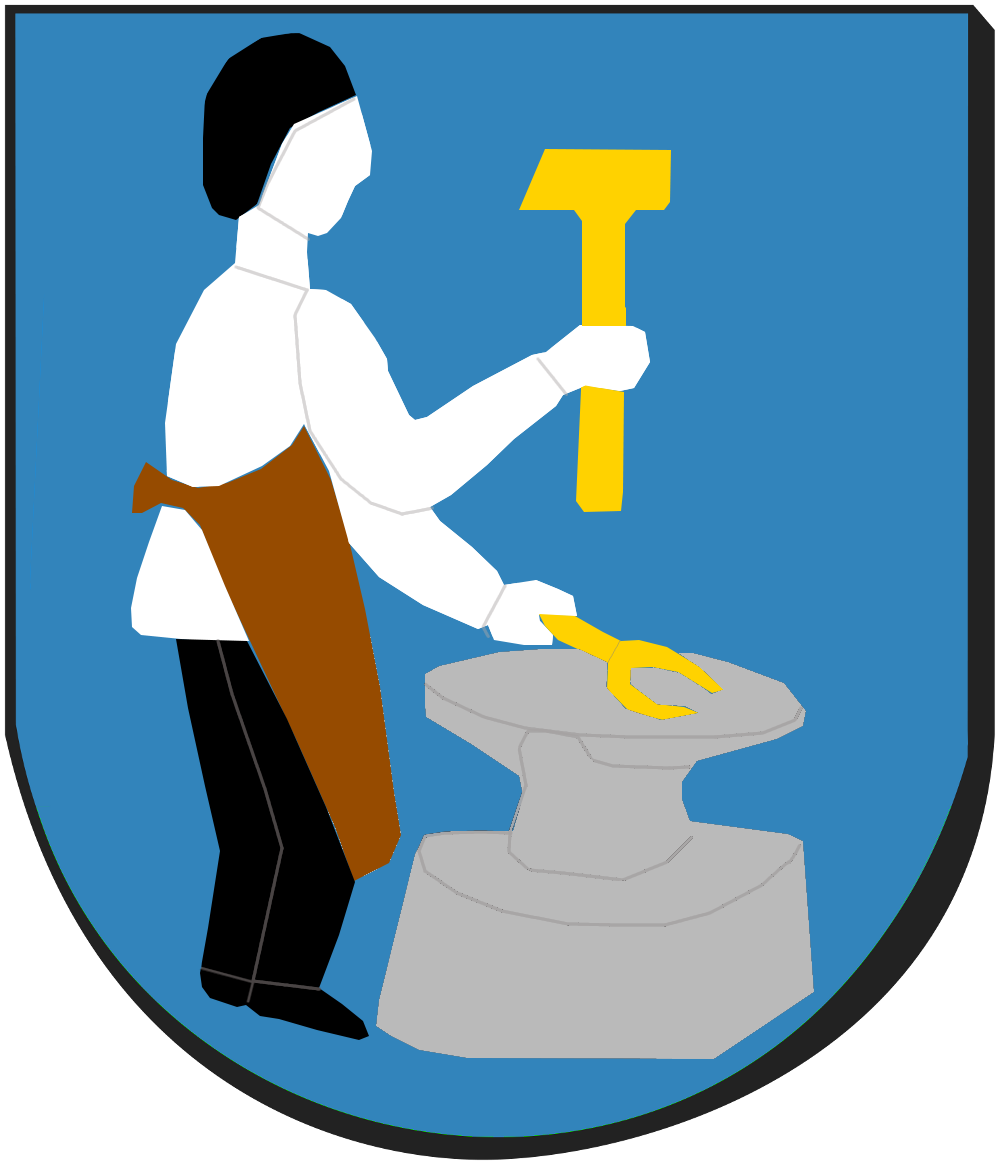
- Coat of arms

- Location within Poland
- Coordinates: 49°49′27.15″N 18°50′28.36″E
- Country: Poland
- Voivodeship: Silesian
- County: Cieszyn
- Gmina: Skoczów
- First mentioned: 1592

Government
  - Mayor: Fryderyk Białoń

Area
  - Total: 3.49 km^{2} (1.35 sq mi)

Population (2016)
  - Total: 688
  - Density: 197/km^{2} (511/sq mi)
- Time zone: UTC+1 (CET)
  - Summer (DST): UTC+2 (CEST)
- Postal code: 43-430
- Car plates: SCI

Kowale is a village in Gmina Skoczów, Cieszyn County, Silesian Voivodeship, southern Poland. It lies in the historical region of Cieszyn Silesia.

== History ==
Remnants of a small tower house have been found in the village, perhaps from the 13th century. The name Kowale (lit. blacksmiths) probably hints on the profession of its inhabitants serving this tower house. The village was but first mentioned in 1592 as Kowalie. Politically it belonged then to the Duchy of Teschen, a fee of the Kingdom of Bohemia, which after 1526 became part of the Habsburg monarchy. In years 1573/1577–1594 it belonged to Skoczów-Strumień state country that was split from the Duchy of Teschen but was later purchased back.

After Revolutions of 1848 in the Austrian Empire a modern municipal division was introduced in the re-established Austrian Silesia. The village as a municipality was subscribed to the political district of Bielsko and the legal district of Skoczów. According to the censuses conducted in 1880, 1890, 1900 and 1910 the population of the municipality grew from 347 in 1880 to 362 in 1910, with a majority of the inhabitants being native Polish-speakers (93.6–99%) and a small minority of German-speaking (most 23 or 6.4% in 1910), in terms of religion the majority were Roman Catholics (66% in 1910), followed by Protestants (31% in 1910) and Jews (11 or 3% in 1910). The village was also traditionally inhabited by Cieszyn Vlachs, speaking Cieszyn Silesian dialect.

After World War I, fall of Austria-Hungary, Polish–Czechoslovak War and the division of Cieszyn Silesia in 1920, it became a part of Poland. It was then annexed by Nazi Germany at the beginning of World War II. After the war it was restored to Poland.
