= Wiślica, Silesian Voivodeship =

Wiślica
- Village
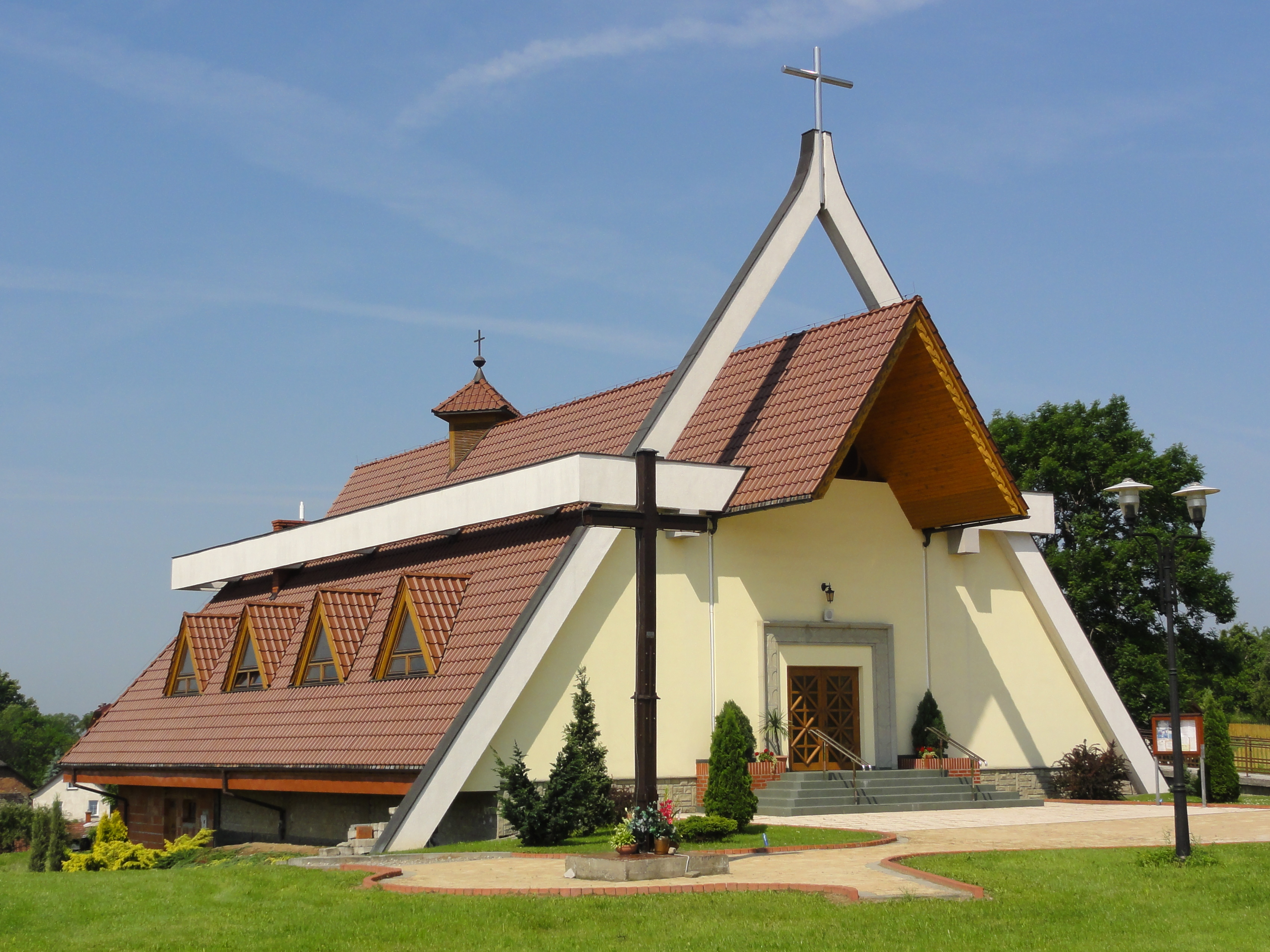
- Chapel of Divine Mercy

- Coat of arms

- Location within Poland
- Coordinates: 49°49′20.03″N 18°46′52.24″E
- Country: Poland
- Voivodeship: Silesian
- County: Cieszyn
- Gmina: Skoczów
- First mentioned: 1447

Government
  - Mayor: Jan Zabłocki

Area
  - Total: 3.57 km^{2} (1.38 sq mi)

Population (2016)
  - Total: 764
  - Density: 214/km^{2} (554/sq mi)
- Time zone: UTC+1 (CET)
  - Summer (DST): UTC+2 (CEST)
- Postal code: 43-430
- Car plates: SCI

Wiślica [viˈɕlit͡sa] is a village in Gmina Skoczów, Cieszyn County, Silesian Voivodeship, southern Poland.

== Etymology ==
The name of the village is of topographic origin, derived from the name of the River Vistula (Polish: Wisła). Some sources claim that the name is connected with the Vistulans tribe, however the village is too young to have existed in the tribal era. The name was mostly Germanised as Wislitz.

== History ==
The village lies in the historical region of Cieszyn Silesia. It was first mentioned in 1447 as Wislicze. Politically the village belonged then to the Duchy of Teschen, a fee of the Kingdom of Bohemia, which, after 1526, became a part of the Habsburg monarchy. In years 1573/1577–1594 it belonged to the Skoczów-Strumień state country that was split from the Duchy of Teschen but was later repurchased.

After the Revolutions of 1848 in the Austrian Empire a modern municipal division was introduced in the re-established Austrian Silesia. The village as a municipality was subscribed to the political district of Bielsko and the legal district of Skoczów. According to the censuses conducted in 1880, 1890, 1900 and 1910 the population of the municipality grew from 313 in 1880 to 425 in 1910 with a majority being native Polish-speakers (99.5%-100%) and in 1910 all of them were Roman Catholics.

After World War I, the fall of Austria-Hungary, the Polish–Czechoslovak War and the division of Cieszyn Silesia in 1920, it became a part of Poland. It was then annexed by Nazi Germany at the beginning of World War II. After the war it was restored to Poland.

== Mayors ==
- Jan Piecha ?-1876
- Jan Wardas 1876-1878
- Paweł Nalewajka ?-1882
- Paweł Lebiedzik 1903-1909

== Geography ==
Wiślica lies in the southern part of Poland, north of Skoczów, 14 km (9 mi) north-east of the county seat, Cieszyn, 19 km (12 mi) west of Bielsko-Biała, 55 km (34 mi) south-west of the regional capital Katowice, and 14 km (8.7 mi) east of the border with the Czech Republic.

The village is situated on a top of one of the hills of the Silesian Foothills, which height is approximately 360 m (1,180 ft) above sea level, 10 km (6.2 mi) north-west of the Silesian Beskids; The hills rises over the left bank of the Vistula river and its eastern slope is covered by a forest protected as a nature reserve, called Skarpa Wiślicka.
