= Skoczów =

Town in Silesian Voivodeship, Poland

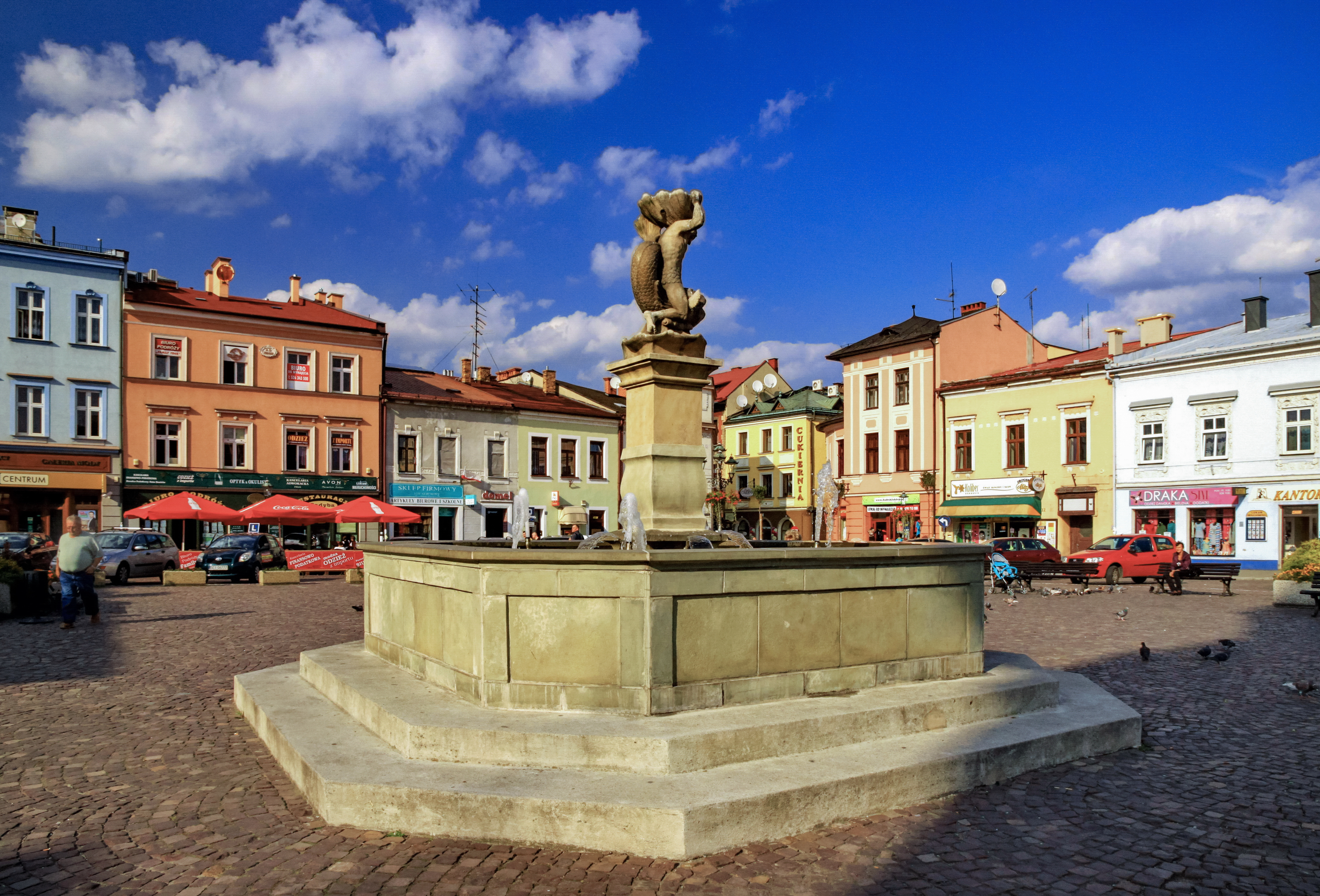
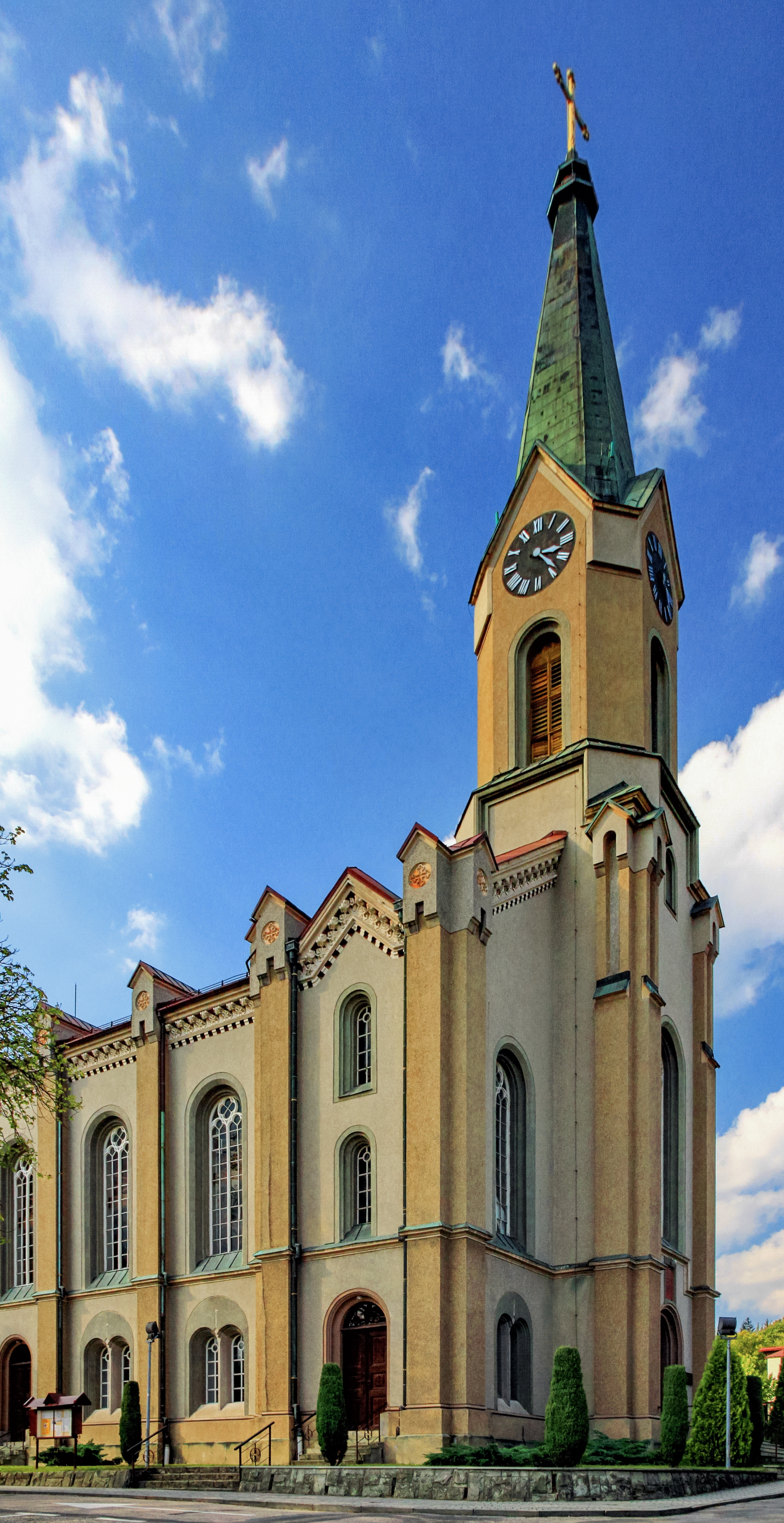
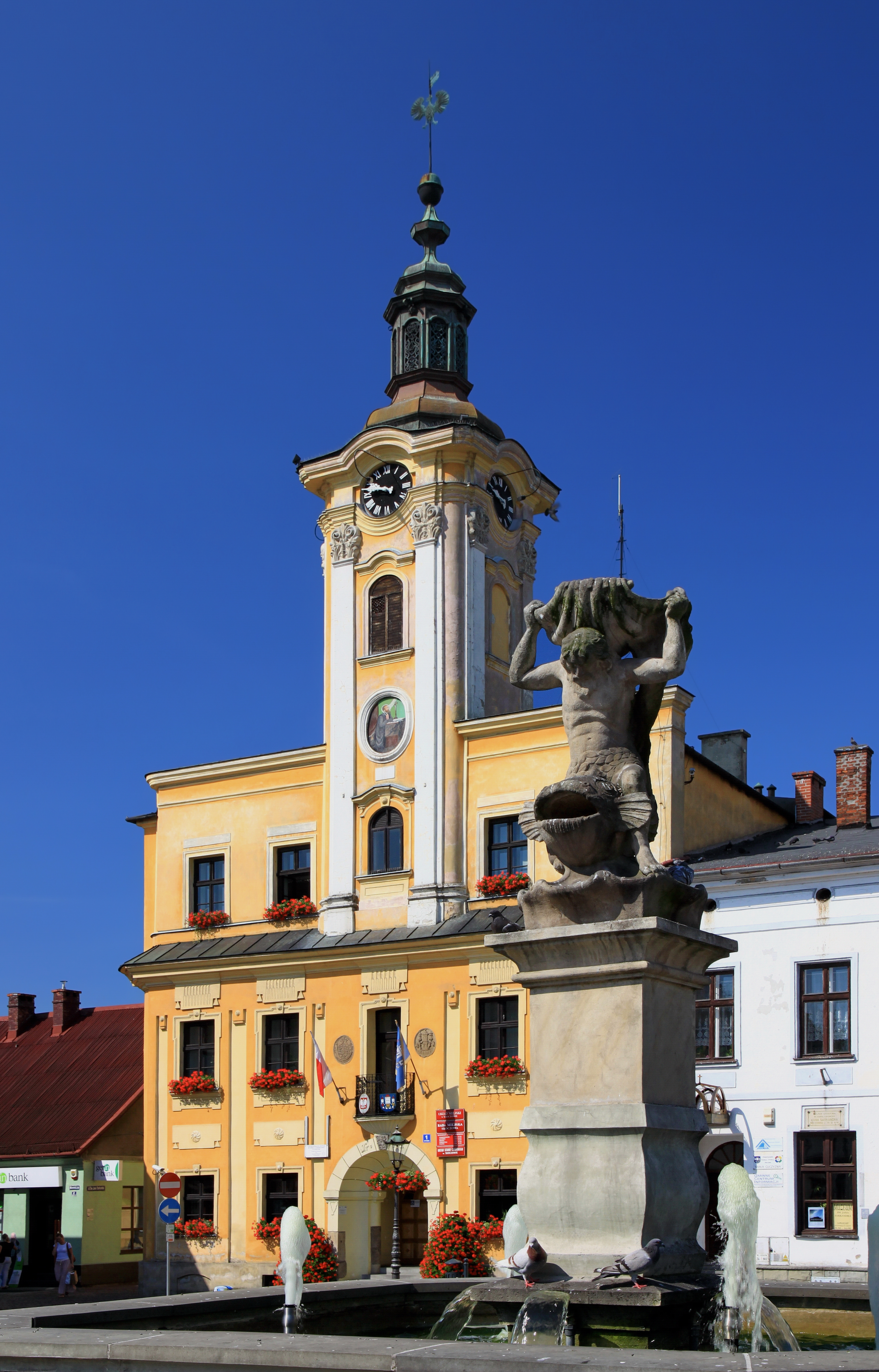
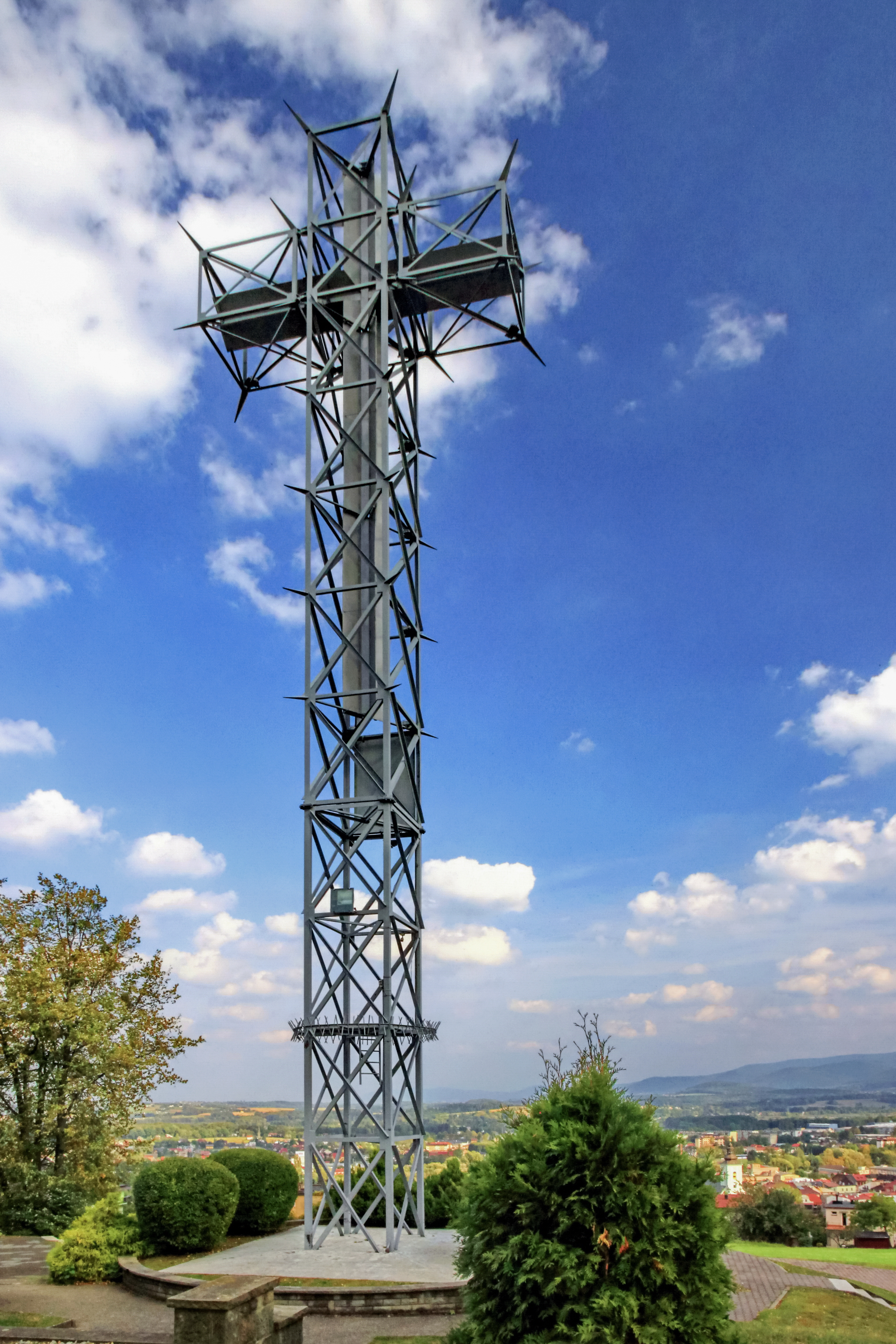
- Rynek (Market Square) Holy Trinity church Town Hall Kaplicówka Hill

- Flag Coat of arms
- Interactive map of Skoczów
- Location within Poland
- Coordinates: 49°48′2″N 18°47′18″E
- Country: Poland
- Voivodeship: Silesian
- County: Cieszyn
- Gmina: Skoczów
- Founded: 13th century (?)
- First mentioned: 1282 (?), 1327

Government
  - Mayor: Rajmund Dedio

Area
  - Total: 9.79 km^{2} (3.78 sq mi)

Population (2019-06-30)
  - Total: 14,385
  - Density: 1,470/km^{2} (3,810/sq mi)
- Time zone: UTC+1 (CET)
  - Summer (DST): UTC+2 (CEST)
- Postal code: 43-430
- Car plates: SCI
- Website: www.um.skoczow.pl

Skoczów (pronounced Sko-choof [ˈskɔt͡ʂuf], German: Skotschau, Czech: Skočov) is a town and the seat of Gmina Skoczów in Cieszyn County, Silesian Voivodeship, southern Poland with 14,385 inhabitants (2019). The town lies in the historical region of Cieszyn Silesia.

The name of the town is of possessive origin, derived from personal name Skocz.

== Geography ==
Skoczów lies in the southern part of Poland, approximately 13 km (8 mi) north-east of the county seat, Cieszyn, 18 km (11 mi) west of Bielsko-Biała, 55 km (34 mi) south-west of the regional capital Katowice, and 14 km (8.7 mi) east of the border with the Czech Republic.

It lies on the confluence of the river Bładnica into the Vistula, reaching up to roughly 380 m (1,250 ft) above sea level (in the west, on the eastern slopes of the Górka Wilamowicka hill), down to 285 m (935 ft) above sea level (the lowest point of the Vistula valley), in the Silesian Foothills, 9 km (5.6 mi) north-west of the Silesian Beskids;

== History ==
The very first settlement in the nearest neighbourhood had been established by a Slavic tribe called Golensizi around the 7th century on a naturally defensive hill over the valley of the river Bładnica and ravine called Piekiełko about 2 km (1.24 mi) south-east of the town centre within borders of modern Międzyświeć. The "gord" was later surrounded by an earth bank and moat. The settlement was destroyed in the end of the 9th century most probably by Great Moravian Prince Svatopluk II and was not rebuilt again.

Sometimes the oldest mentioning of Skoczów is believed to be from the document allegedly issued in 1232 by Mieszko, dux Oppoliensis et dominus Tessinensis et Ratiboriensis (implicitly Mieszko II the Fat) for a knight Przecho from Zabłocie, were among witnesses is a ducal writer, Mikołaj from Coczow (Skoczów). Some researchers consider the document to be a fake. Idzi Panic takes into consideration that it could be a mistake during rewriting, and that the document could be originally issued in 1282 by Mieszko, who later ruled the Duchy of Cieszyn (formed in 1290, where Skoczów also belonged), but back then together with younger brother Przemko ruled Duchy of Racibórz with castellanies of Cieszyn and Oświęcim, and would more likely use the title dux Oppoliensis et dominus Tessinensis et Ratiboriensis than Mieszko II the Fat (who never used as complicated title). The rewriter could have omitted the number L in the year MCCLXXXII (1282), making it MCCXXXII (1232). If the document was indeed a fake, then the first mentioning of Skoczów as oppidum Scocoviense is from 1327 when Duke Casimir I became a vassal of the King of Bohemia. The term oppidum (used also for Jamnica preceding Frýdek) was used in contrary to civitates ruling themselves under German rights of Cieszyn, Bielsko and Frysztat. It probably meant that Skoczów was yet ruled under Polish (ducal) traditional rights.

In the document from 1327 there is also mentioned a gord, which can be linked with a subsequent wooden castle revealed in later documents. The settlement of Skoczów most probably emerged as its podgrodzie, a small locality serving it, which later evolved into a market settlement with irregular arrangement of buildings centered on main oval square a few hundred meters north of nowadays Market Square, where later (but no earlier than late 1330s) a parish church was built. The location of the town around new Market Square under German rights took place hypothetically roughly at similar time as of Frýdek, in the late 14th century. The new town had regular arrangement of buildings stretched towards the parish church in the north. It was surrounded with ramparts from wood and earth with two gates: Upper and Lower. Through the Upper Gate a path led towards Cieszyn in the east, through Lower towards Bielsko in the west. Behind the Upper Gate emerged the Upper Suburb, whereas on the right and eastern bank of Vistula River was located a Lower Suburb. In the beginning Skoczów was a small town, with around 450 citizens in the middle of the 15th century. It had been mainly an agricultural and craft trade settlement with much lower importance of trade. A local Catholic parish was first mentioned in the register of Peter's Pence payment from 1447 among 50 parishes of Cieszyn deanery as Scotczowa.

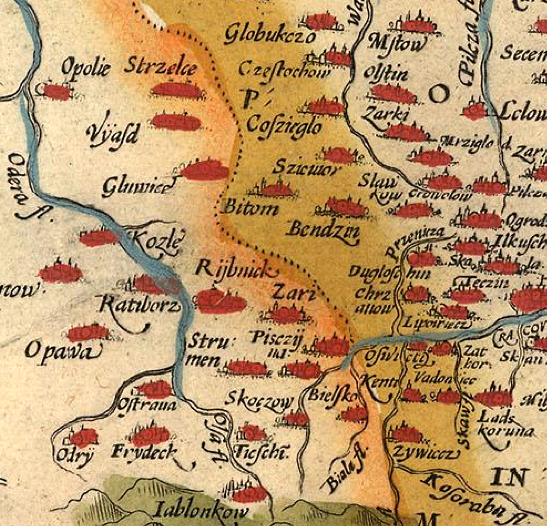
Fragment of a map from 1592 with Skoczow marked

In the late 1469 or early 1470 Skoczów was destroyed by fire, which burnt all chartered privileges and other documents. 26 January 1470 the Duke of Cieszyn renewed and extended all civic privileges. A school and hospital with a chapel are recorded in a document from 1482. During Reformation under Wenceslaus III Adam rule it was dominated by Lutherans, who took over the parish church, and later also hospital's chapel. At that time Jan Sarkander was born here. In the years 1573-1577 during the rule of Wenceslaus III Adam the town together with Strumień and their surrounding villages were sold to Gottard von Logau, and formed a state country. (Note: Apart from Skoczów and Strumień 11 villages belonged to the state country: Brenna, Górki Małe, Kiczyce, Kowale, Lipowiec, Łazy, Wieszczęta, Wiślica, Zabłocie, Zarzecze and Zbytków, and furthermore Mnich was established at that time) It was retrieved by Adam Wenceslaus in 1594. In 1610 Adam Wenceslaus switched his faith to Catholicism, and brought a new priest from Żywiec, Wojciech Gagatkowski. However Lutherans dominated the town for decades, the majority of Catholics was reported in 1687.

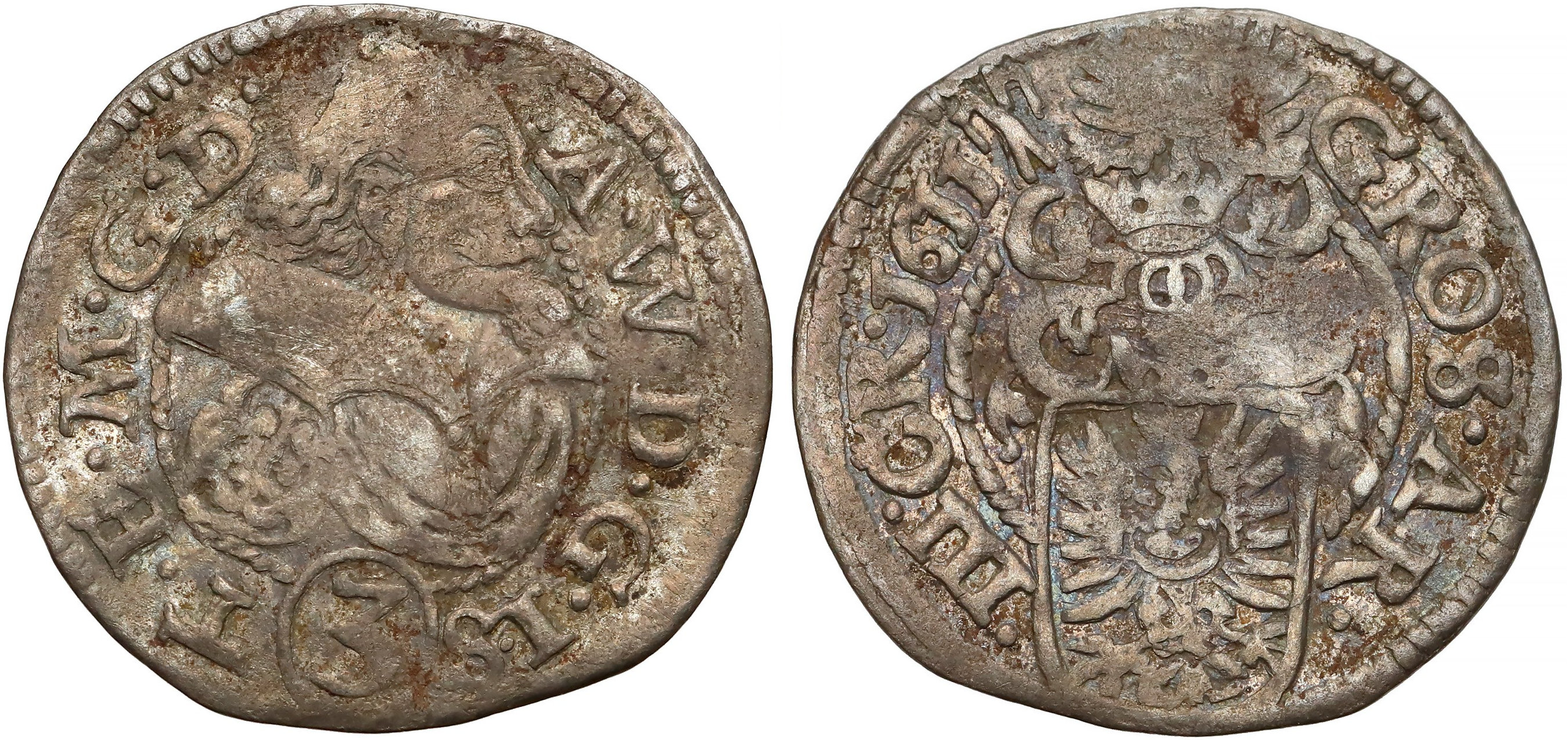
17th-century coin of the Duchy of Cieszyn from the local mint

Since 1653 the town belonged to the Teschener Kammer. The 17th century was disastrous for Skoczów as well as for whole region. Because of Thirty Years' War the population was decreased by about 25-30%.

After the Revolutions of 1848 in the Austrian Empire a modern municipal division was introduced in the re-established Austrian Silesia. The town became a seat of a legal district in the political district of Bielsko. According to the censuses conducted in 1880, 1890, 1900 and 1910 the population of the town grew from 3113 in 1880 to 3744 in 1910. In 1880 the majority of its inhabitants were native Polish-speakers (69.3%) followed by German-speakers (29.5%) and Czech-speakers (1.2%). In the next years the Polish-speaking population dropped down to 48.4% in 1910, whereas German-speaking citizens grew in number up to 50.3% in 1910, Czech-speaking minority stood at relatively similar level of 1.3%. In terms of religion in 1910 majority were Roman Catholics (65.3%), followed by Protestants (27.8%), Jews (247 or 6.6%) and 12 people were adherents to yet another religion. The town and especially its surroundings were also traditionally inhabited by Cieszyn Vlachs, speaking Cieszyn Silesian dialect. The growth of German language, then prestigious language of the state, can be partially attributed to various reasons, including cultural cringe of indigenous Slavic denizens.

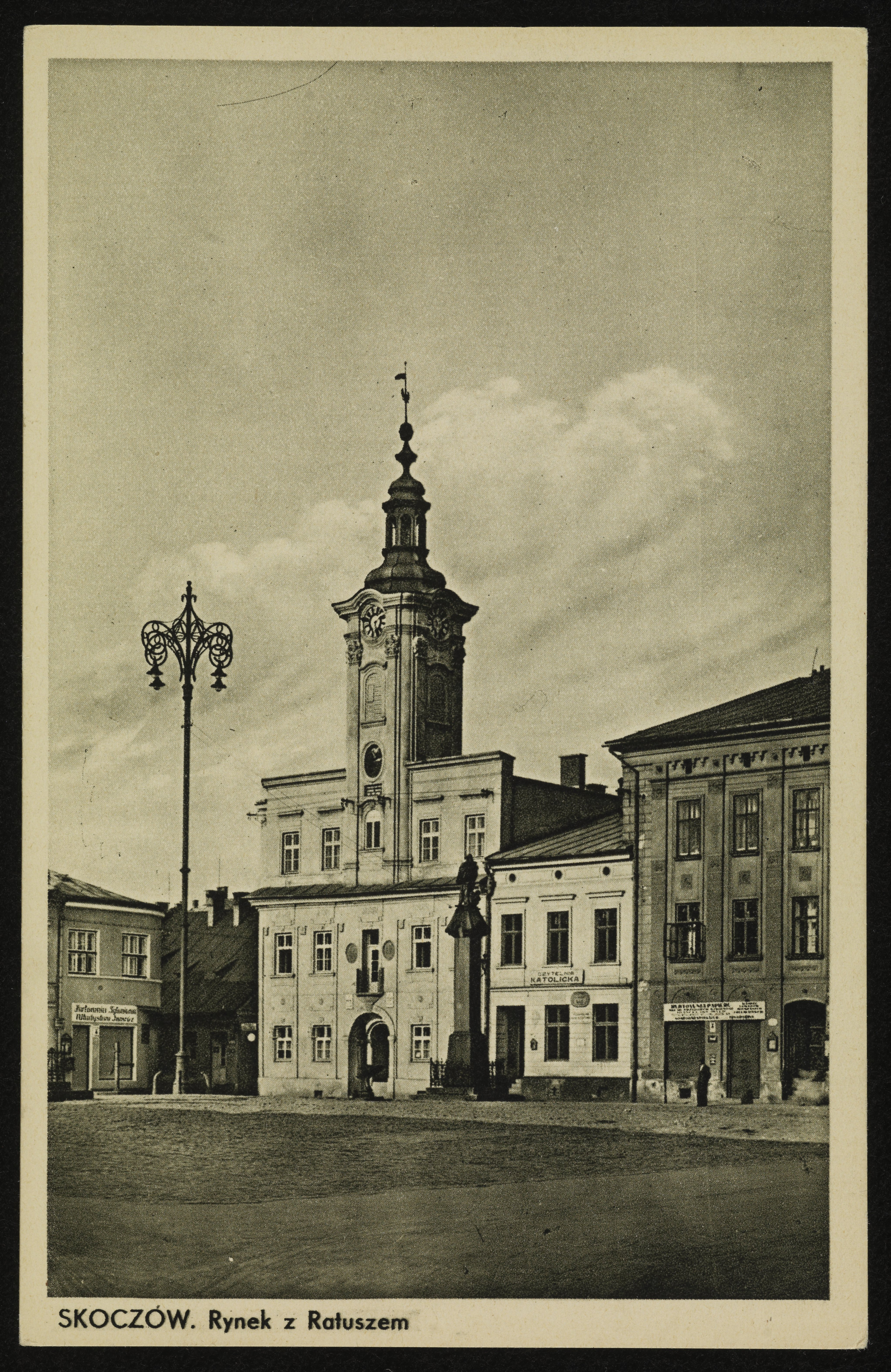
Market Square in the 1930s

After the end of World War I, both of the two newly created independent states of Poland and Czechoslovakia claimed the area of Cieszyn Silesia. On 23 January 1919 Czech units led by Colonel Josef Šnejdárek invaded the area, and clashed after its swift advance with Polish units commanded by General Franciszek Latinik near Skoczów where a battle took place on 28–30 January. It was inconclusive, and before the reinforced Czech forces could resume the attack on the town, they were pressed by Entente to stop operations and a cease-fire was signed on 3 February. On 28 July 1920 by decision of the Spa Conference Skoczów became a part of the Second Polish Republic. According to the 1921 census, Skoczów had a population of 3,494, 80.2% Polish, 16.3% German, 3.3% Jewish and 0.2% Czech.

It was then annexed by Nazi Germany at the beginning of World War II. After the war it was restored to Poland.

Kaplicówka Hill which overlooks the town is dominated by a chapel built in 1934 and a large cross. Pope John Paul II visited Skoczów in 1995, holding a mass attended by 200,000 people. The cross on Kaplicówka was erected to commemorate the visit.

From 1975 to 1998 it was located in the Bielsko-Biała Voivodeship, and since 1999 in Silesian Voivodeship.

The town holds a market on Thursdays, situated next to the Vistula river.

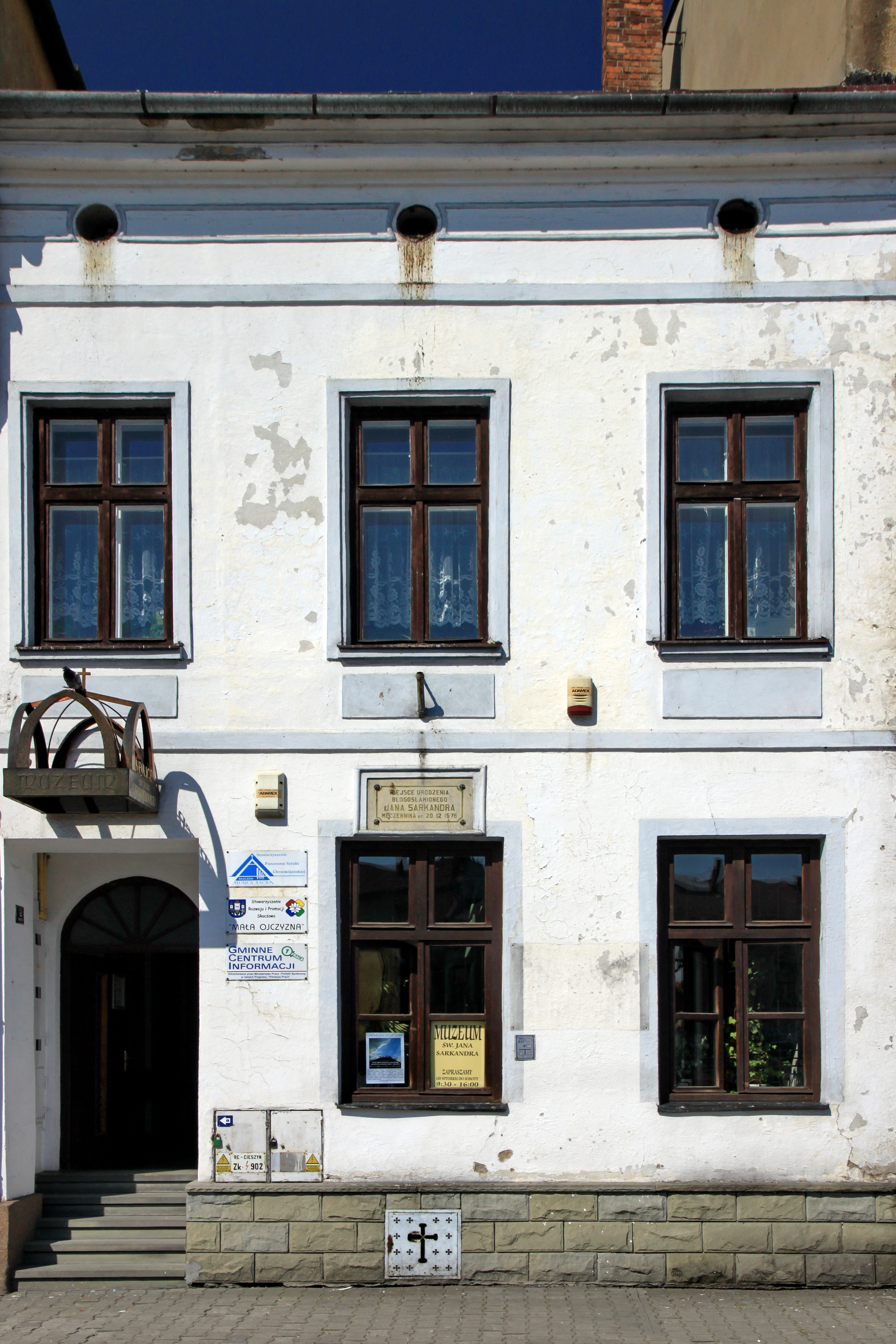
Jan Sarkander Museum at his birthplace

== Notable people ==
- Jan Sarkander (1576–1620), priest and martyr, Saint of the Catholic Church
- Gustaw Morcinek (1891–1963), writer commonly associated with Silesia, Member of Parliament of the People's Republic of Poland

== Twin towns – sister cities ==
See twin towns of Gmina Skoczów.

== Gallery ==
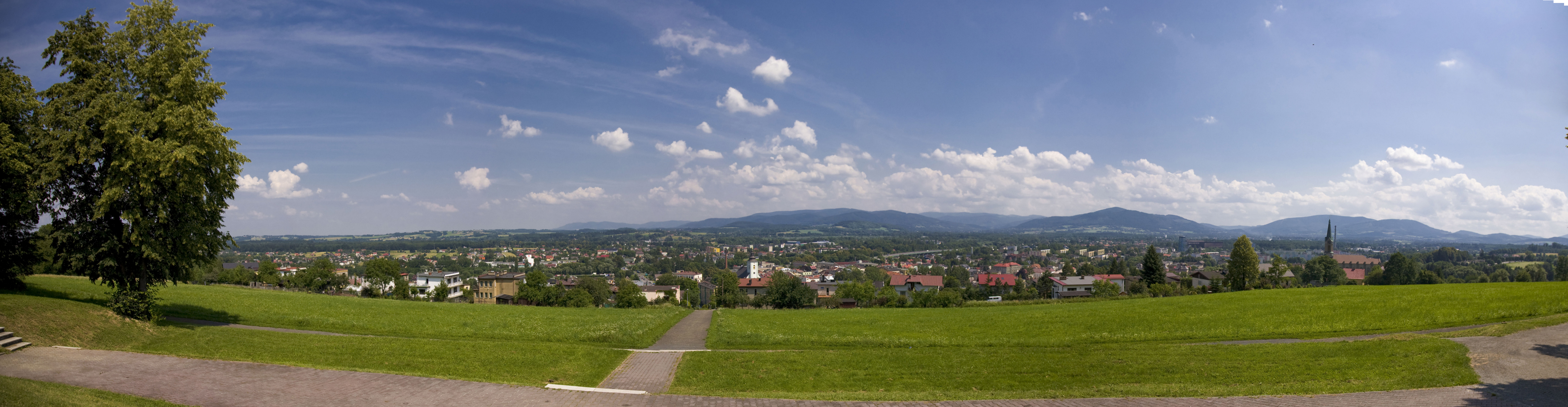
Panorama of Skoczów from Kaplicówka Hill
