= Cieszyn County =

Cieszyn County Powiat cieszyński
- County
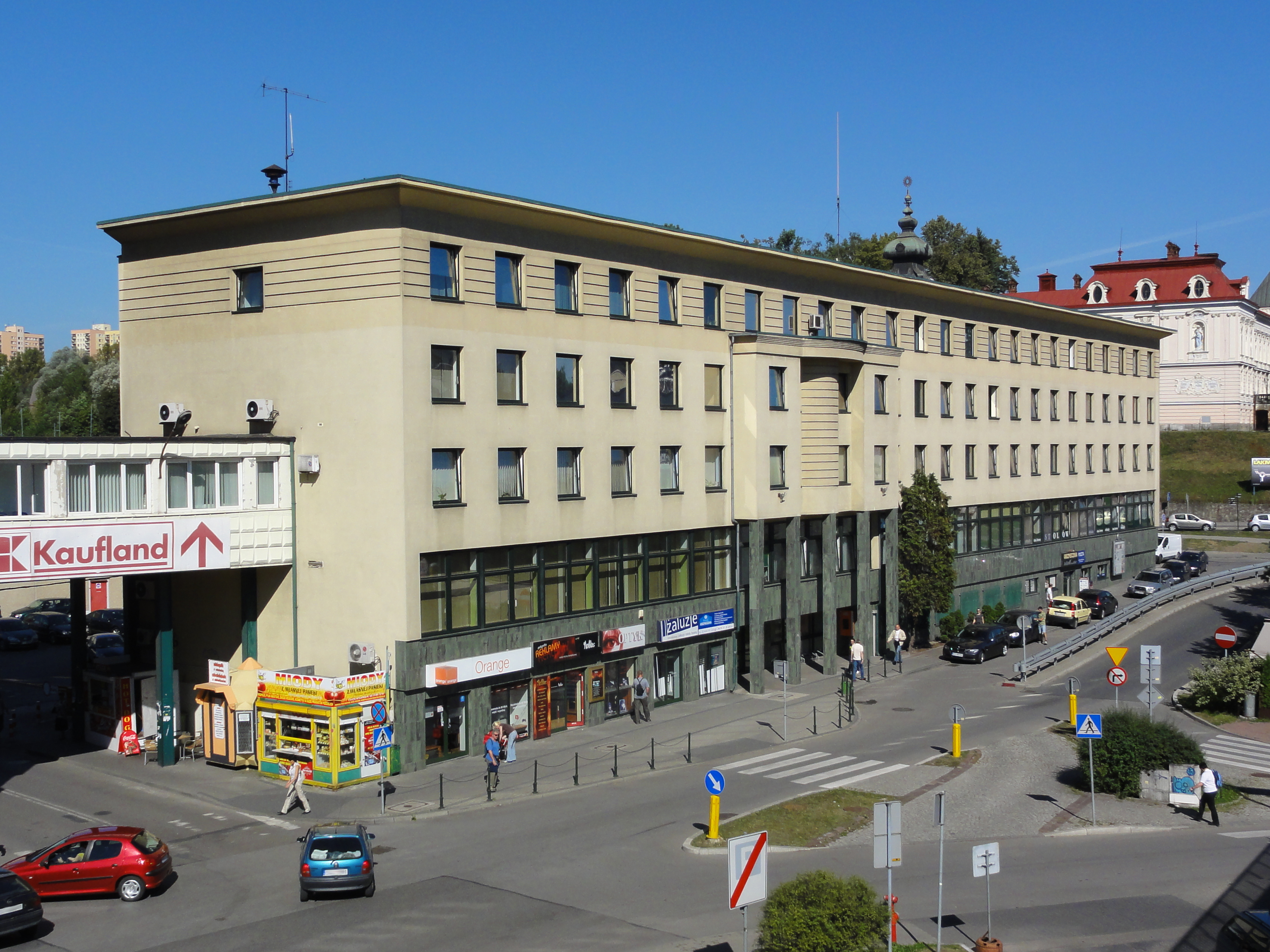
- County office building in Cieszyn

- Flag Coat of arms

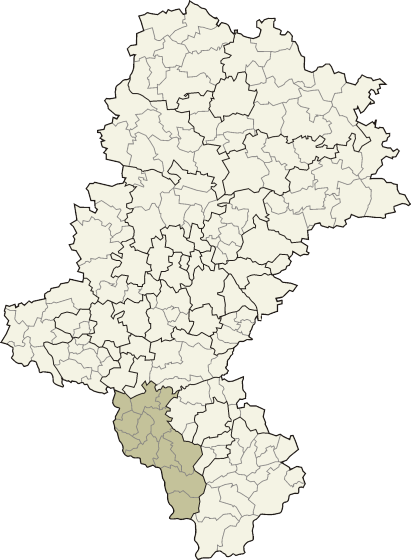
- Location within Silesian Voivodeship
- Coordinates (Cieszyn): 49°44′55.07″N 18°38′5.69″E
- Country: Poland
- Voivodeship: Silesian
- Seat: Cieszyn
- Gminas: Total 12 (incl. 3 urban): Cieszyn; Ustroń; Wisła; Gmina Brenna; Gmina Chybie; Gmina Dębowiec; Gmina Goleszów; Gmina Hażlach; Gmina Istebna; Gmina Skoczów; Gmina Strumień; Gmina Zebrzydowice

Government
  - Starosta: Mieczysław Szczurek

Area
  - Total: 730.2 km^{2} (281.9 sq mi)

Population (2019-06-30)
  - Total: 178,145
  - Density: 244.0/km^{2} (631.9/sq mi)
  - Urban: 79,821
  - Rural: 98,324
- Car plates: SCI
- Website: www.powiat.cieszyn.pl

Cieszyn County (Polish: powiat cieszyński) is a unit of territorial administration and local government (powiat) in Silesian Voivodeship, southern Poland, on the Czech and Slovak border. It came into being on January 1, 1999, as a result of the Polish local government reforms passed in 1998.

The county's administrative seat and largest town is Cieszyn, which lies on the Czech border 62 kilometres (39 mi) south-west of the regional capital Katowice. The county also contains four other towns: Ustroń, 14 km (9 mi) east of Cieszyn, Skoczów, 15 km (9 mi) north-east of Cieszyn, Wisła, 20 km (12 mi) south-east of Cieszyn, and Strumień, 23 km (14 mi) north-east of Cieszyn.

The county covers an area of 730.2 square kilometres (281.9 sq mi). As of 2019 its total population is 178,145, out of which the population of Cieszyn is 34,513, that of Ustroń is 16,073, that of Skoczów is 14,385, that of Wisła is 11,132, that of Strumień is 3,718, and the rural population is 98,324.

== History ==
The county was first created after Revolutions of 1848 in the Austrian Empire in 1850 as Politischer Bezirk Teschen, one of the seven counties in Austrian Silesia. After World War I, fall of Austria-Hungary, Polish–Czechoslovak War and the division of Cieszyn Silesia in 1920, the territory of the county was divided between Poland and Czechoslovakia. The bigger part of the Austrian county found in Czechoslovakia was superseded by Český Těšín District and smaller part found in Poland, was enlarged by four municipalities of the Austrian Bezirk Freistadt and more than a dozen from Bezirk Bielitz and was admitted Poland Silesian Voivodeship. Following the Munich Agreement, in October 1938 the Trans-Olza region was annexed by Poland and on 27 September Český Těšín was joined with Cieszyn and 53 municipalities were also adjoined to Cieszyn County. It was then annexed by Nazi Germany at the beginning of World War II with the county known as Landkreis Teschen. After the war pre-1938 borders were restored. In 1975 the county-level division of Poland was replaced with 49 voivodeships, with the territory of Cieszyn County being encompassed by Bielsko-Biała Voivodeship. It was recreated on January 1, 1999, within Silesian Voivodeship, pursuant to the Polish local government reforms adopted in 1998.

== Neighbouring counties ==
Cieszyn County is bordered by the city of Jastrzębie-Zdrój and Pszczyna County to the north, and the city of Bielsko-Biała, Bielsko County and Żywiec County to the east. It also borders the Czech Republic to the west and Slovakia to the south.

== Administrative divisions ==
The county is subdivided into 12 gminas (three urban, two urban-rural and seven rural). These are listed in the following table, in descending order of population.

Gmina	Type	Area (km^{2})	Population (2019)	Seat
Cieszyn	urban	28.7	34,513	
Gmina Skoczów	urban-rural	63.3	26,943	Skoczów
Ustroń	urban	58.9	16,073	
Gmina Zebrzydowice	rural	41.7	13,240	Zebrzydowice
Gmina Strumień	urban-rural	58.4	13,240	Strumień
Gmina Goleszów	rural	65.9	13,160	Goleszów
Gmina Istebna	rural	84.3	12,129	Istebna
Gmina Brenna	rural	95.5	11,222	Brenna
Wisła	urban	110.3	11,132	
Gmina Hażlach	rural	49.0	10,872	Hażlach
Gmina Chybie	rural	31.8	9,803	Chybie
Gmina Dębowiec	rural	42.5	5,818	Dębowiec

== See also ==
- Cieszyn Silesia
- Euroregion Cieszyn Silesia
- Olza (river)
