= Marklovice =

Marklovice (Polish: Marklowice, lit. 'Marklowice') may refer to:

- Markoviće, a village in Kuršumlija, Serbia
- a village in Cieszyn Silesia divided in 1920 between Czechoslovakia and Poland:
  - Dolní Marklovice, a village in the Czech Republic
  - Marklowice Górne, a village in Poland
- Marklowice, Silesian Voivodeship, in southern Poland

== See also ==
- Markovićevo, a village in Serbia
