= Freistadt District (Austrian Silesia) =

- political district
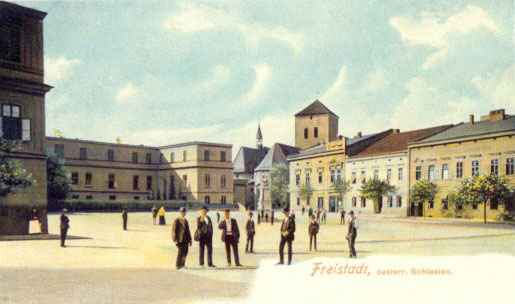

- Location within Czech Republic
- Coordinates: 49°51′15″N 18°32′34″E

Freistadt District (German: Politischer Bezirk Freistadt, Czech: Politický okres Fryštát, Polish: Powiat polityczny Frysztat) was a political district (equivalent to okres in the Czech Republic and powiat in Poland) in Austrian Silesia, Austria-Hungary existing between 1868 and 1920 (superseded by Czechoslovak Okres Fryštát). Its administrative center was the town of Freistadt (now administratively a part of the city of Karviná, Czech Republic).

== History ==
Revolutions of 1848 in the Austrian Empire led to various social, legal and also administrative reforms. In the late December 1849 Austrian Silesia was re-established and was initially subdivided into seven political districts, additionally divided into legal districts (German: Gerichtsbezirk). Freistadt became a seat of legal district in Teschen political district. In the era of Bach's neo-absolutism political districts were abolished and replaced by district offices (German: Bezirksamt) encompassing territories of the abolished legal districts. Political districts were re-established in 1868. Freistadt became then the seat of the newly established Freistadt political district. It consisted of two legal districts: Freistadt and Oderberg (Czech: Bohumín, Polish: Bogumin; before 1855 belonging to Friedek political district).

In 1880 Freistadt political district was administratively divided into 40 municipalities (23 in Freistadt legal district and 17 in Oderberg). Before 1890 Muglinau (Muglinov) was separated from Herzmanitz (Heřmanice) and Dittmannsdorf (Dětmarovice) was moved from Oderberg legal district to Freistadt legal district. On 1 January 1904 7 municipalities were excluded from Oderberg legal district to form a new Polnish Ostrau (Polská/Slezská Ostrava) legal district in Friedek political district. Before 1910 also Wirbitz (Vrbice) was separated from Pudlau (Pudlov), which was then merged with Oderberg. After this changes Freistadt political district consisted of 34 municipalities (24 in Freistadt legal district and 10 in Oderberg).

According to the censuses conducted in 1880, 1890, 1900 and 1910 this 34 municipalities (317 km²) had a combined population of:

	1880	1890	1900	1910
Freistadt legal district 24 municipalities, as of 1910)	35,782	43,313	62,412	80,498
Polish-speaking	24,885 (69.5%)	33,221 (76.7%)	52,545 (84.2%)	57,344 (71.2%)
Czech-speaking	8,650 (24.2%)	7,747 (17.9%)	6,372 (10.2%)	17,748 (22%)
German-speaking	2,219 (6.2%)	2,313 (5.3%)	3,336 (5.3%)	5.351 (6.7%)
Oderberg legal district (10 municipalities, as of 1910)	13,469	16,474	27,558	38,300
Polish-speaking	10,487 (77.9%)	13,457 (81.7%)	19,182 (69.6%)	18,118 (47.3%)
Czech-speaking	1,516 (11.2%)	1,382 (8.4%)	3,342 (12.2%)	10,355 (27%)
German-speaking	1,463 (10.9%)	1,635 (9.9%)	4,943 (17.9%)	9,808 (25.6%)

Such a large growth in population was owing to an industrial development within the district luring a large influx of migrant workers, mostly from western Galicia. Traditionally the area in most parts was inhabited by Silesian Lachs speaking Cieszyn Silesian dialect. After World War I and fall of Austria-Hungary the region of Cieszyn Silesia including the territory of Freistadt political district became disputed land between Czechoslovakia and Poland. This led to Polish–Czechoslovak War and the division of the region and district on 28 July 1920, by a decision of the Spa Conference. Majority of the municipalities became a part of Czechoslovakia (with the district being afterwards known as Okres Fryštát) and only the easternmost municipalities became a part of Poland, and were then transferred to Cieszyn County.

Language and denominational declarations in the censuses 1880-1910
Polish language

Czech language

German language

Roman Catholics

Lutherans

Majorities by language 1880-1910 and border changes 1918-1920;
Polish-speaking majority
Czech-speaking majority
German-speaking majority
no majority
border

== Municipal division ==
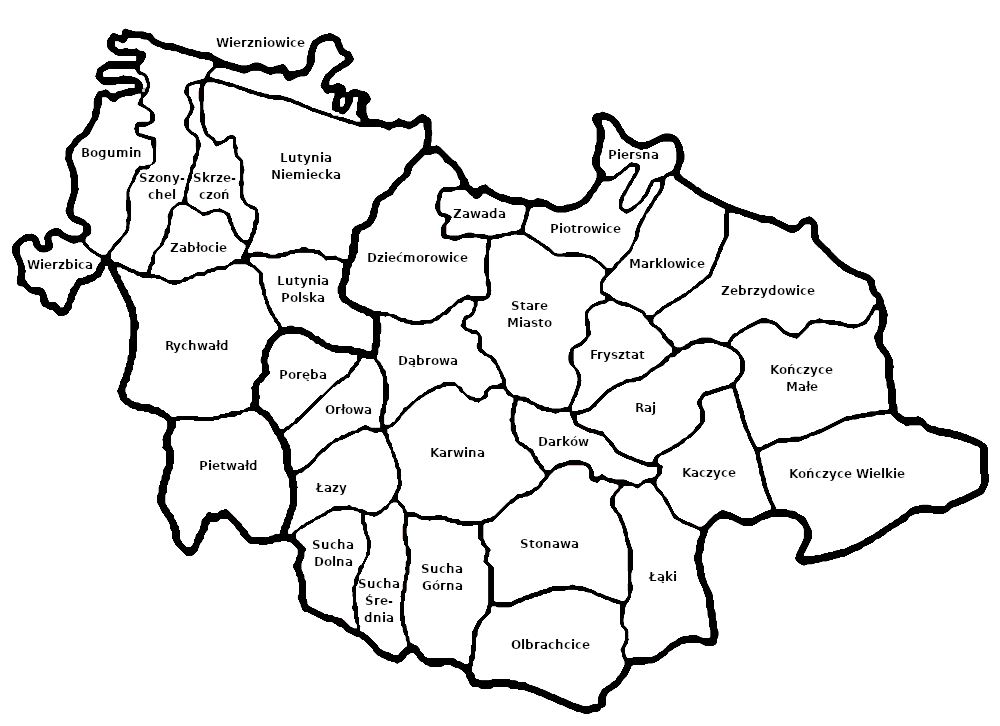
Municipalities (1910)

As of 1910:

Freistadt legal district (Gerichtsbezirk Freistadt)

1. Albersdorf
2. Altstadt
3. Darkau
4. Dittmannsdorf
5. Dombrau (market town)
6. Freistadt (town)
7. Karwin (market town)
8. Katschitz
9. Gross Kuntschitz
10. Klein Kuntschitz
11. Lazy
12. Lonkau
13. Marklowitz (now Marklowice Górne, Poland and Dolní Marklovice, Czech Republic)
14. Orlau (market town)
15. Petrowitz
16. Piersna
17. Poremba
18. Roj
19. Seibersdorf
20. Steinau
21. Mittel Suchau
22. Nieder Suchau
23. Ober Suchau
24. Zawada

Oderberg legal district (Gerichtsbezirk Oderberg)

1. Deutschleuten
2. Oderberg (town)
3. Peterswald
4. Polnischleuten
5. Reichwaldau
6. Schönichel
7. Skrzeczon
8. Wilmersdorf
9. Wirbitz
10. Zablacz

== See also ==
- Frysztat County
- Karviná District
