= Prstná =

Village in Karviná District, Czech Republic

Coordinates: 49°54′46″N 18°33′19″E

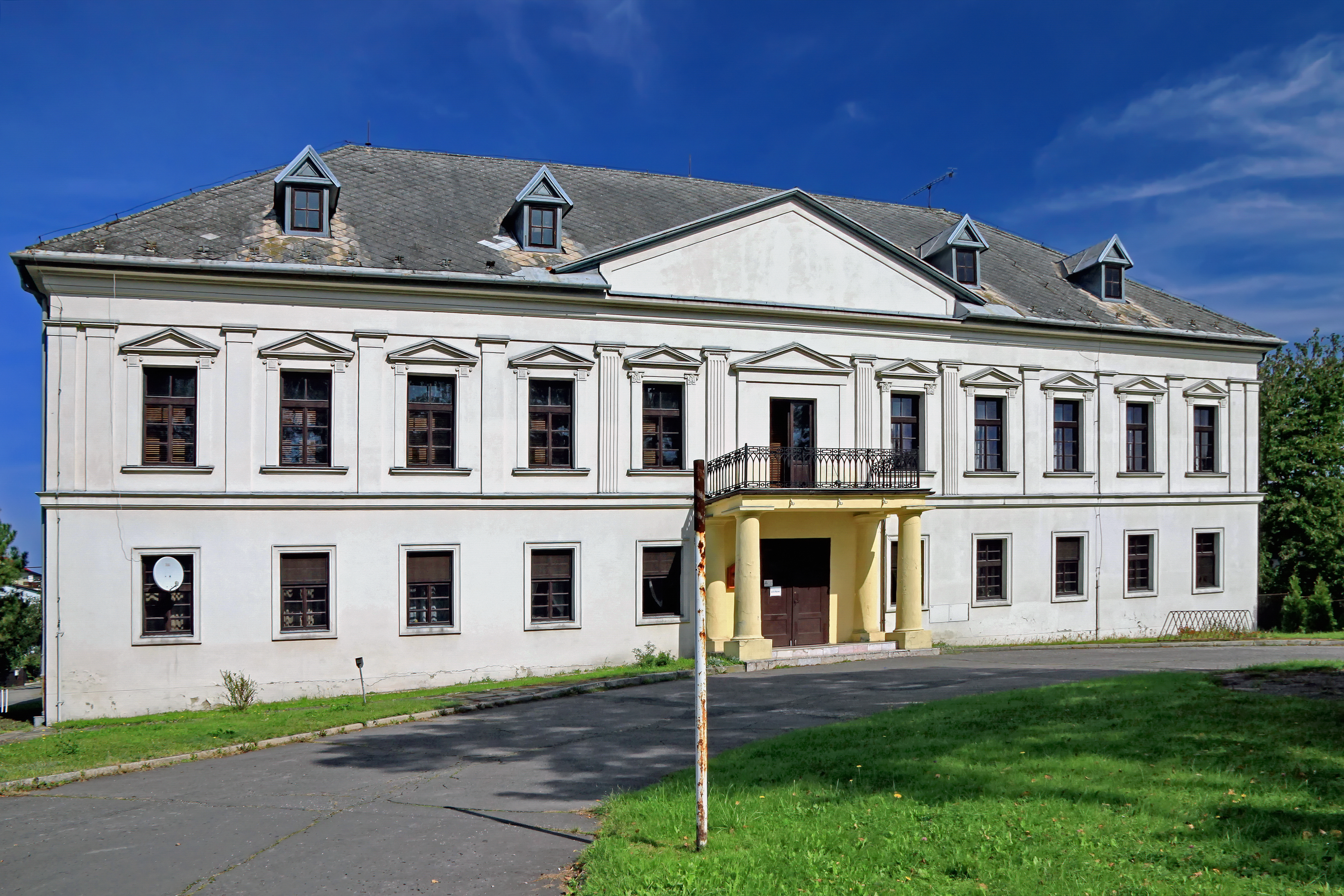
A hunting lodge in Prstná

Prstná (Polish: Piers(t)na, German: Piersna) is a village in Karviná District, Moravian-Silesian Region, Czech Republic. It was a separate municipality but became administratively a part of Petrovice u Karviné in 1952.

The name of the village is topographic in origin denoting dust, soil.

== History ==
It was first mentioned in 1447 in a written sentence: potwrdili jsme Prsnu.

Politically the village belonged initially to the Duchy of Teschen, formed in 1290 in the process of feudal fragmentation of Poland, since 1327 it was a fee of the Kingdom of Bohemia, which after 1526 became a part of the Habsburg monarchy.

Since 1796 the village belonged to Gussnar noble family, who built a residence here in 1798, currently an important landmark in the village.

After the Revolutions of 1848 in the Austrian Empire, a modern municipal division was introduced in the re-established Austrian Silesia. The village as a municipality was subscribed at least since 1880 to political district and legal district of Freistadt.

According to the censuses conducted in 1880, 1890, 1900 and 1910 the population of the municipality grew from 448 in 1880 to 680 in 1910. In terms of the language spoken colloquially the majority were Polish-speakers (at least 95.4% in 1880, at most 98.9% in 1900), accompanied by German-speakers (at most 18 or 4.4% in 1880) and Czech-speakers (at most 5 or 0.8% in 1910). In terms of religion, in 1910 the majority were Roman Catholics (679 or 99.9%). The village was also traditionally inhabited by Silesian Lachs, speaking Cieszyn Silesian dialect.

After World War I, the fall of Austria-Hungary, the Polish–Czechoslovak War and the division of Cieszyn Silesia in 1920, the village became a part of Czechoslovakia. Following the Munich Agreement, in October 1938 together with the Zaolzie region it was annexed by Poland, administratively organised in Frysztat County of Silesian Voivodeship. The village was then annexed by Nazi Germany at the beginning of World War II. After the war it was restored to Czechoslovakia.
