= Reichswald =

A Reichswald or imperial forest was an area of historic woodland which existed in the Holy Roman Empire and was under direct imperial control, protection and usage.

Reichswald may refer to:

- Nürnberger Reichswald, a nature reserve near Nuremberg
  - Sebalder Reichswald, a section of the Nuremberg Reichswald, which takes its name from the associated church dedicated to the local forest hermit, Saint Sebald (or Sebaldus)
- Klever Reichswald, a German state forest in North Rhine-Westphalia
- Kaufungen Forest, a protected natural area on the border between the states of Hesse and Lower Saxony in central Germany

== See also ==
- Rychvald
