= Závada (Petrovice u Karviné) =

Coordinates: 49°54′0″N 18°30′0″E

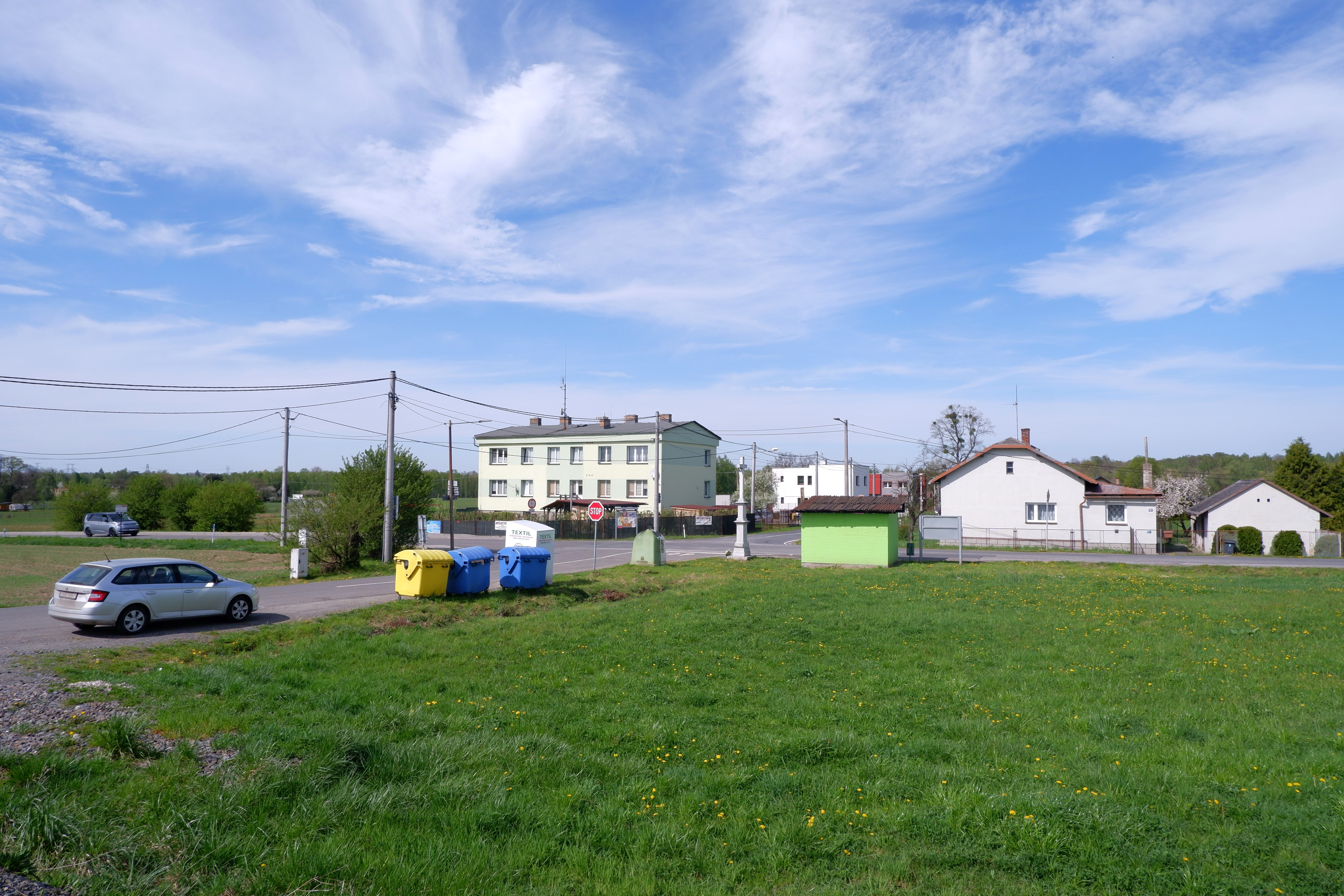
Centre of the village

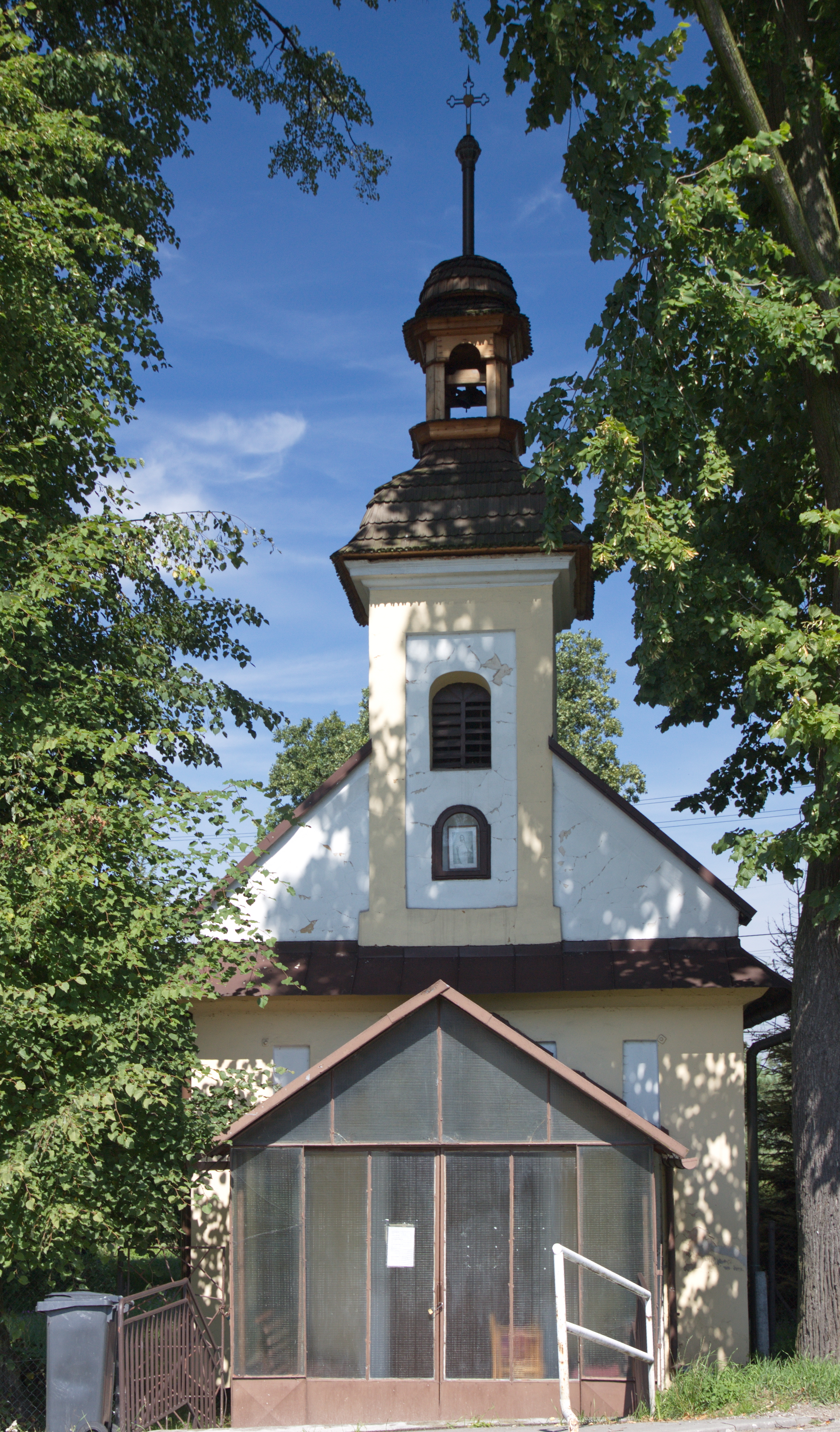
St. John of Nepomuk chapel

Závada (Polish: Zawada) is a village and administrative part of Petrovice u Karviné in Karviná District, Moravian-Silesian Region, Czech Republic.

== Etymology ==
The name of the village is of Slavic topographic or cultural origins denoting "a natural or artificial obstacle".

== Geography ==
The Petrůvka River flows to the Olza in the village.

== History ==
It was first mentioned in 1447 as Zawada. Politically the village belonged initially to the Duchy of Teschen, a fee of the Kingdom of Bohemia, which after 1526 became a part of the Habsburg monarchy.

After the Revolutions of 1848 in the Austrian Empire, a modern municipal division was introduced in the re-established Austrian Silesia. The village as a municipality was subscribed at least since 1880 to political district and legal district of Freistadt.

According to the censuses conducted in 1880–1910 the population of the municipality grew from 492 in 1880 to 590 in 1910. In terms of the dominant language spoken colloquially the majority were Polish-speakers (between 95.1% and 96.3%), accompanied by German-speakers (at most 4.7% in 1880), and by Czech-speakers (at most 5 or 0.9% in 1910). In terms of religion, in 1910 the majority were Roman Catholics (97%), followed by Jews (11 or 1.8%) and Protestants (7 or 1.2%).

After World War I, Polish–Czechoslovak War and the division of Cieszyn Silesia in 1920, the village became a part of Czechoslovakia. Following the Munich Agreement, in October 1938 together with the Trans-Olza region it was annexed by Poland, administratively organised in Frysztat County of Silesian Voivodeship. The village was then annexed by Nazi Germany at the beginning of World War II. After the war it was restored to Czechoslovakia.

Závada was a separate municipality but became administratively a part of Petrovice u Karviné in 1952.

== See also ==
- Polish minority in the Czech Republic
