= Louky (Karviná) =

Coordinates: 49°48′30″N 18°34′10″E

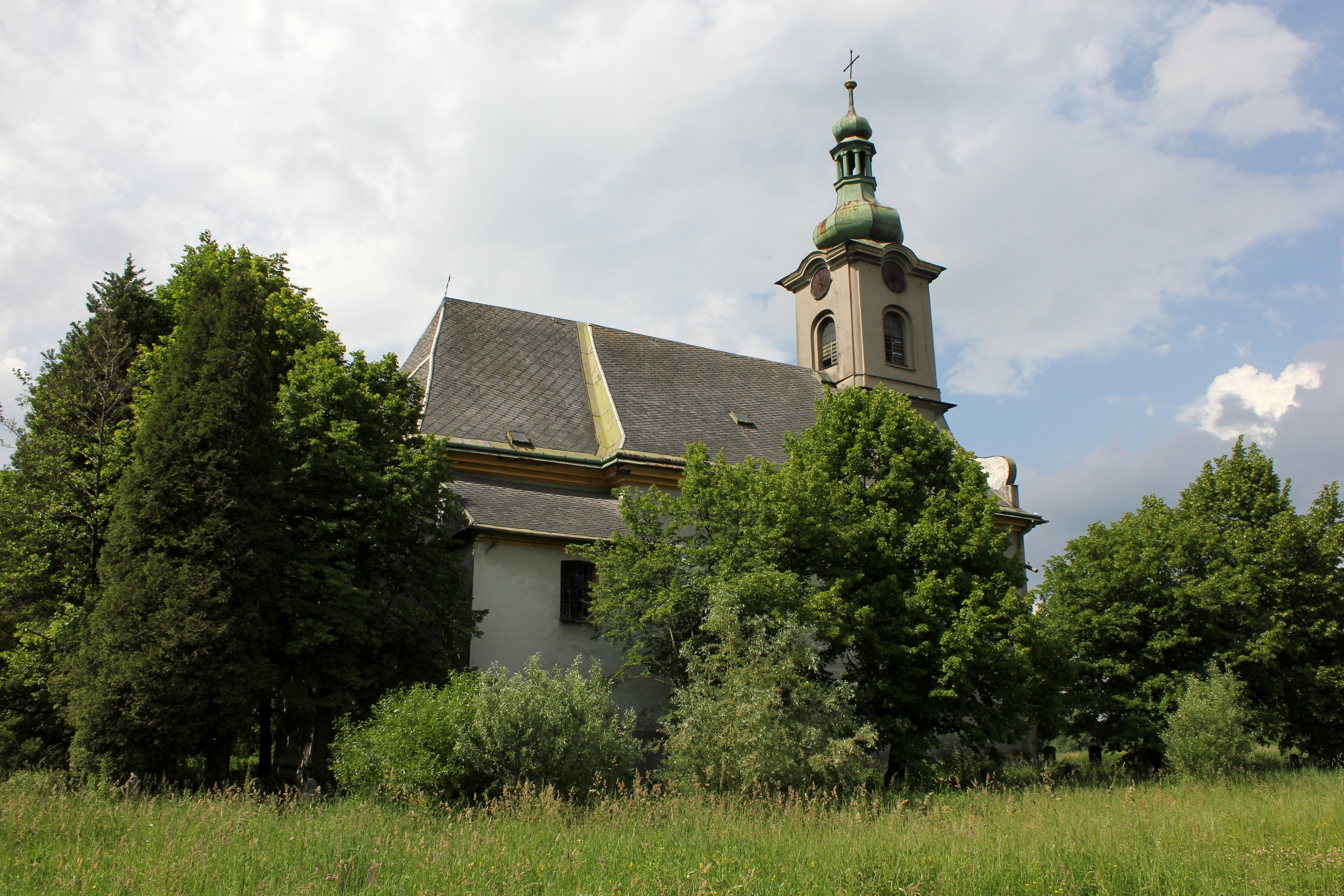
Old Church of Saint Barbara

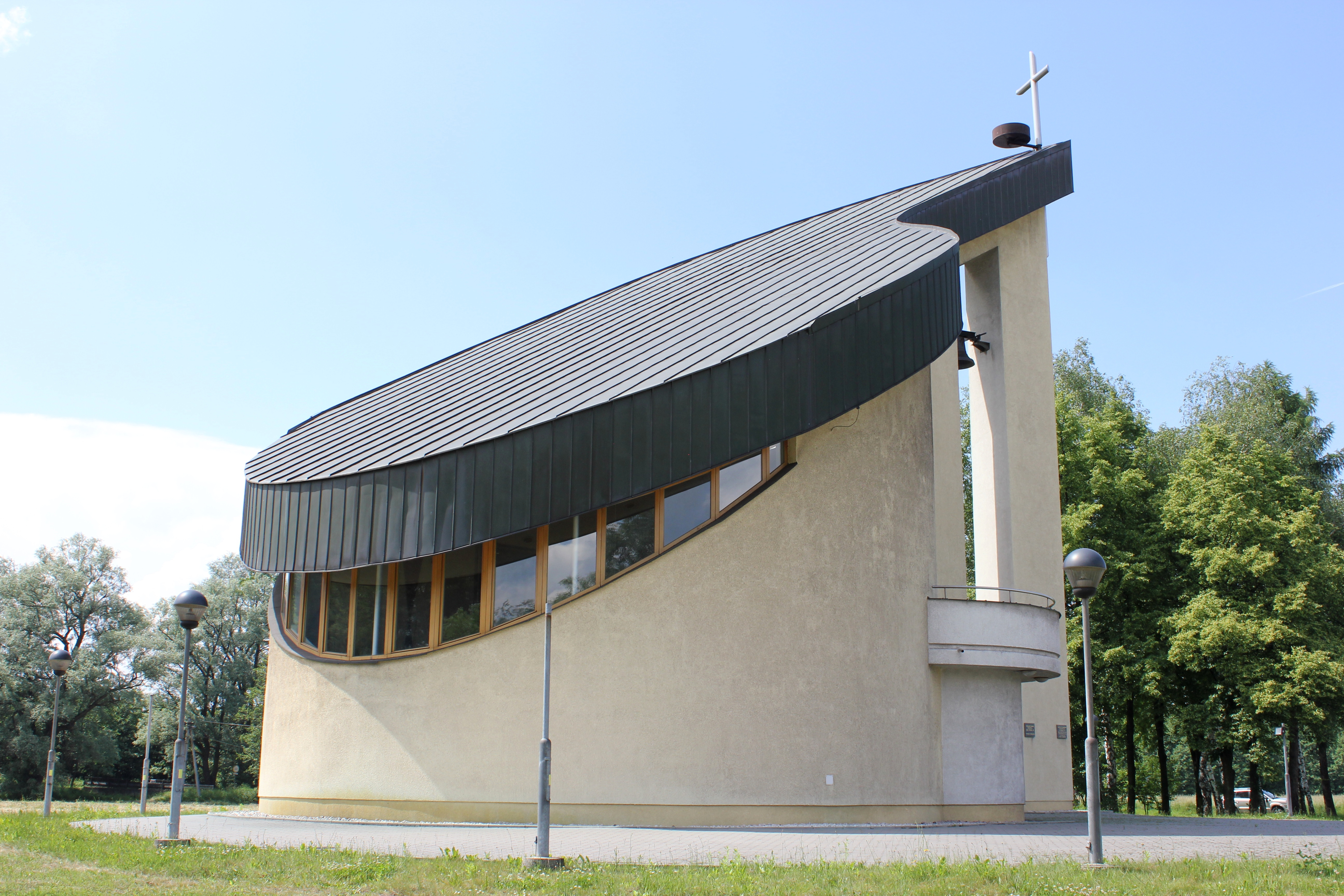
New Church of Saint Barbara

Louky nad Olší (Polish: Łąki nad Olzą, German: Lonkau) (literally, "meadows upon Olza") is a village in the Karviná District, Moravian-Silesian Region, Czech Republic, since 1975 administratively a part of the city of Karviná as Louky, formerly a separate municipality. It lies on the left bank of the Olza River, in the historical region of Cieszyn Silesia. It has a population of 453 (2001).

== History ==
The village is first mentioned in a written document from 1450 as Lanky. Politically the village belonged then to the Duchy of Teschen, a fee of the Kingdom of Bohemia, which after 1526 became part of the Habsburg monarchy.

Historically, the village owed its prosperity to its fortunate position between the important towns of Frysztat and Cieszyn. Its inhabitants engaged mostly in fish farming in the complex of ponds near the village.

It is not clear when the first church was built; the oldest record mentions a wooden church in 1654. Because the Olza frequently flooded the church, a new Saint Barbara Church was built in 1818. The last church service was held in 1995.

After the Revolutions of 1848 in the Austrian Empire a modern municipal division was introduced in the re-established Austrian Silesia. The village as a municipality was subscribed at first to the political district of Teschen and the legal district of Freistadt, which in 1868 became an independent political district.

According to the censuses conducted in 1880, 1890, 1900 and 1910 the population of the municipality grew from 917 in 1880 to 1,792 in 1910. The majority were Polish-speaking (between 97.2% and 98.6%), followed by German-speaking minority (at most 28 or 2.5% in 1890) and Czech-speaking people (at most 17 or 1% in 1910). In terms of religion, in 1910 the majority were Roman Catholics (1,687 or 94.2%), followed by Protestants (68 or 3.8%), Jews (10 or 0.5%), and others (27 or 1.5%). The village was also traditionally inhabited by Silesian Lachs, speaking Cieszyn Silesian dialect.

After World War I, the fall of Austria-Hungary, the Polish–Czechoslovak War and the division of Cieszyn Silesia in 1920, the village became a part of Czechoslovakia. Following the Munich Agreement, in October 1938 together with the Zaolzie region it was annexed by Poland, administratively organised in Frysztat County of Silesian Voivodeship. The village was then annexed by Nazi Germany at the beginning of World War II. After the war it was restored to Czechoslovakia.

Louky is a classic example of the devastation wrought by heavy industry, in this case, coal mining. The centre of the village was originally located north of today's settlement. During the Communist era, extensive mining activities irrevocably damaged the original village. Surface waters were polluted, farmland was degraded, the whole area was undermined, new ponds appeared, the water level rose, and mine tailings accumulated. All this sealed the fate of the old village; almost all the houses sank into the ground, and the village was demolished. Today only the Saint Barbara Church remains. It is structurally unstable, and it is only a matter of time before it too is gone.

Today's village lies south of original location and is much smaller. It is served by a small railway station. New Catholic church has been constructed there.

== See also ==
- Polish minority in the Czech Republic
- Zaolzie
