= Paszek =

Paszek is a Polish surname. Notable people include:

- Daria Paszek (born 1991), Polish volleyball player
- Rudolf Paszek (1894–1969), Polish teacher, national activist, community organizer and politician
- Tamira Paszek (born 1990), Austrian tennis player
