= Petrovice u Karviné =

Petrovice u Karviné Piotrowice koło Karwiny
- Municipality
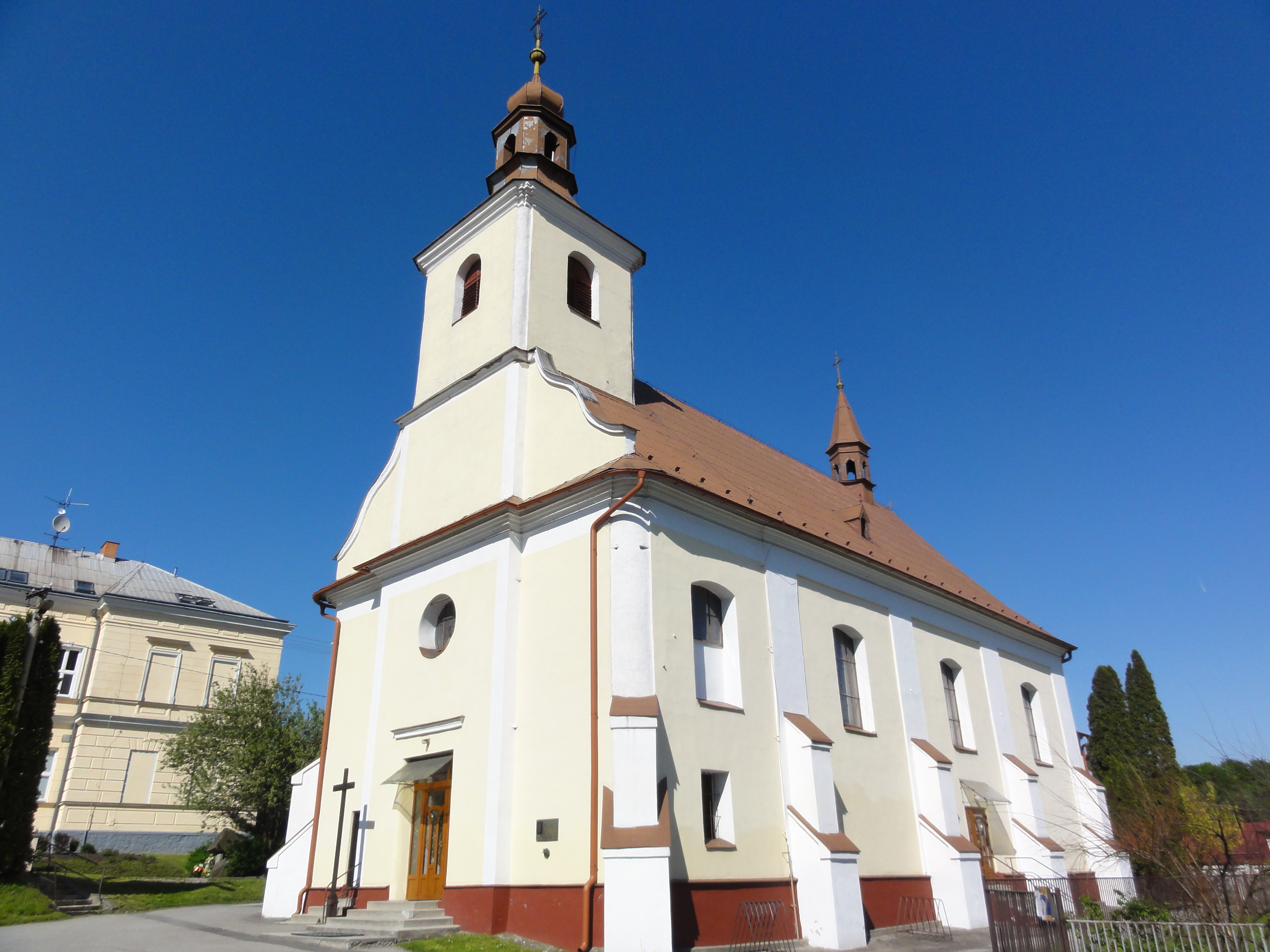
- Church of Saint Martin

- Flag Coat of arms

- Location in the Czech Republic
- Coordinates: 49°53′46″N 18°32′38″E
- Country: Czech Republic
- Region: Moravian-Silesian
- District: Karviná
- First mentioned: 1335

Area
  - Total: 20.47 km^{2} (7.90 sq mi)
- Elevation: 212 m (696 ft)

Population (2026-01-01)
  - Total: 4,973
  - Density: 242.9/km^{2} (629.2/sq mi)
- Time zone: UTC+1 (CET)
  - Summer (DST): UTC+2 (CEST)
- Postal code: 735 72
- Website: www.petroviceuk.cz

Petrovice u Karviné (Czech pronunciation: [ˈpɛtrovɪtsɛ ˈu karvɪnɛː]; 1920–1952 Petrovice; Polish: Piotrowice koło Karwiny, German: Petrowitz bei Freistadt) is a municipality and village in Karviná District in the Moravian-Silesian Region of the Czech Republic. It has about 5,000 inhabitants, making it one of the most populous Czech municipalities without the town status.

== Administrative division ==
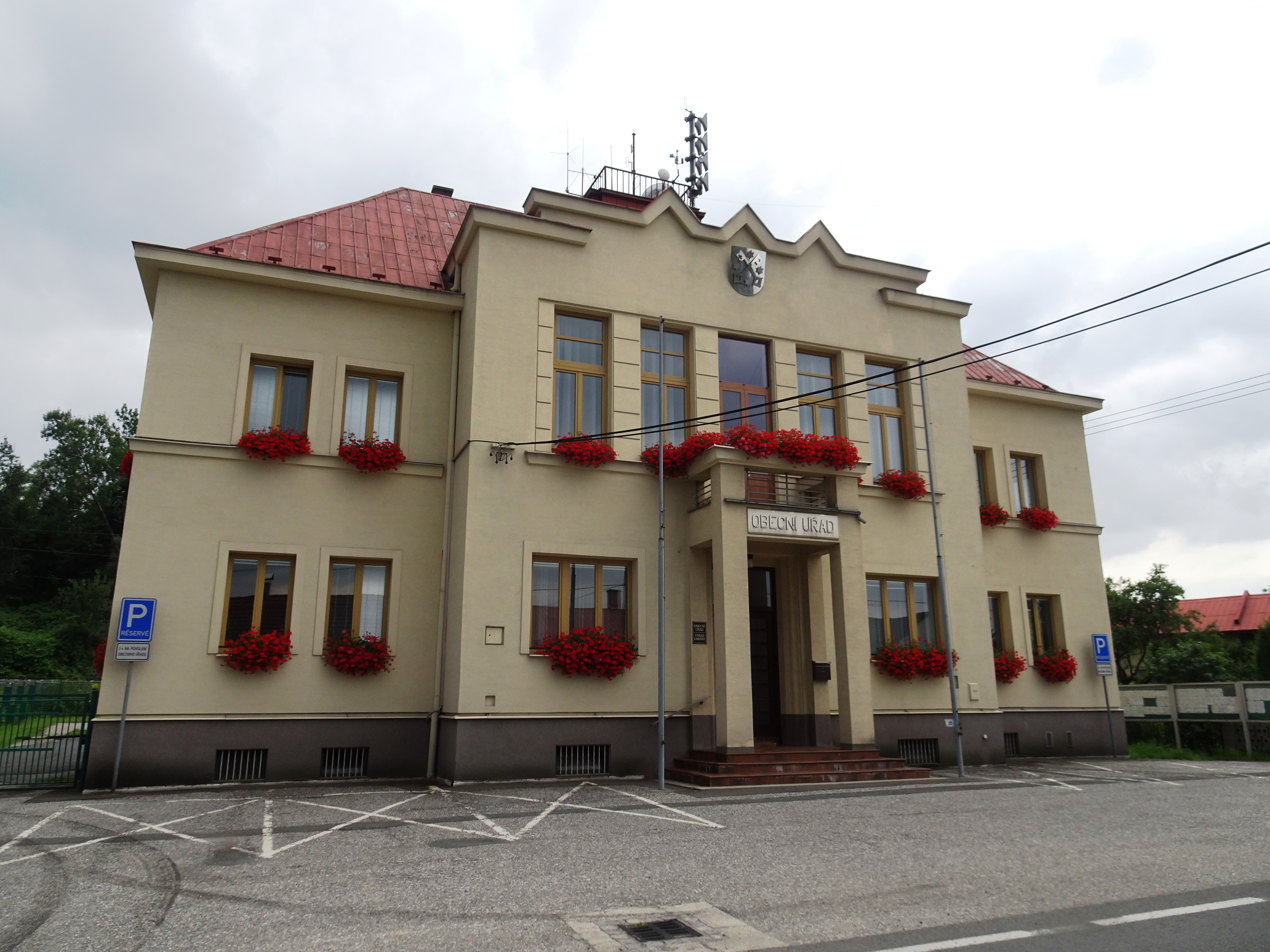
Municipal office

Petrovice u Karviné consists of four municipal parts (in brackets population according to the 2021 census):

- Petrovice u Karviné (2,096)
- Dolní Marklovice (1,476)
- Prstná (540)
- Závada (723)

== Etymology ==
The name Petrovice is derived from the personal name Petr/Piotr, meaning "Petr's village". Petrovice was renamed Petrovice u Karviné after the extension of the municipality in 1952.

== Geography ==
Petrovice u Karviné is located about 3 kilometres (2 mi) north of Karviná and 17 km (11 mi) northeast of Ostrava, on the border with Poland. It lies in the Ostrava Basin in the historical region of Cieszyn Silesia. The Petrůvka River flows through the municipality and forms a part of the Czech–Polish border. It enters the Olza River in Závada. There are several fishponds in the municipality.

== History ==
The first written mention of Petrovice is from 1335, when it was mentioned as a seat of a Catholic parish in an incomplete register of Peter's Pence payment as villa Petri. The oldest part of the municipality is Dolní Marklovice, which was first mentioned in Liber fundationis episcopatus Vratislaviensis from around 1305. Politically, the area belonged initially to the Duchy of Cieszyn, established during the fragmentation of Poland into smaller duchies. Petrovice was again mentioned in the register of Peter's Pence payment from 1447 among the 50 parishes of Cieszyn deanery as Petirsdorff. It remained ruled by the Piast dynasty until 1653.

After the 1540s Protestant Reformation prevailed in the Duchy of Cieszyn and a local Catholic church was taken over by Lutherans. It was taken from them (as one from around fifty buildings in the region) by a special commission and given back to the Roman Catholic Church on 14 April 1654.

After the Revolutions of 1848 in the Austrian Empire, a modern municipal division was introduced in the re-established Austrian Silesia. The village as a municipality was subscribed at least since 1880 to political district and legal district of Freistadt.

According to the censuses conducted in 1880–1910 the population of the municipality grew from 1,022 in 1880 to 1,444 in 1910. In terms of the language the majority were Polish-speakers (at least 82.8% in 1880, at most 91.3% in 1900), accompanied by German-speakers (at least 6.7% in 1900, at most 15% in 1880) and Czech-speakers (at most 2.6% in 1910). In terms of religion, in 1910 the majority were Roman Catholics (1,410 or 97.6%), followed by Protestants (20 or 1.4%) and Jews (14 or 1%).

After World War I, the Polish–Czechoslovak War and the division of Cieszyn Silesia in 1920, the municipality became a part of Czechoslovakia. Following the Munich Agreement, in October 1938 together with the Trans-Olza region it was invaded by Polish army and annexed by Poland, administratively organised in Frysztat County of Silesian Voivodeship. The municipality was then annexed by Nazi Germany at the beginning of World War II. In 1942–1945, the Germans operated a Polenlager forced labour camp for Poles in the village. After the war, Petrovice was restored to Czechoslovakia.

In 1952, the municipalities of Dolní Marklovice, Prstná and Závada were merged with Petrovice.

== Demographics ==
According to the censuses, Polish minority made up 12.8% of the population in 2011, but it dropped to 6.8% in 2021. Around 23.4% of the population is religious (mostly Roman-Catholic), which is about the double of the national average.

Historical population

Year	Pop.	±%
1869	2,403	—
1880	2,716	+13.0%
1890	2,831	+4.2%
1900	3,149	+11.2%
1910	3,696	+17.4%

Year	Pop.	±%
1921	3,893	+5.3%
1930	4,450	+14.3%
1950	3,735	−16.1%
1961	3,957	+5.9%
1970	3,810	−3.7%

Year	Pop.	±%
1980	3,831	+0.6%
1991	4,092	+6.8%
2001	4,517	+10.4%
2011	5,446	+20.6%
2021	4,835	−11.2%

Source: Censuses

== Transport ==
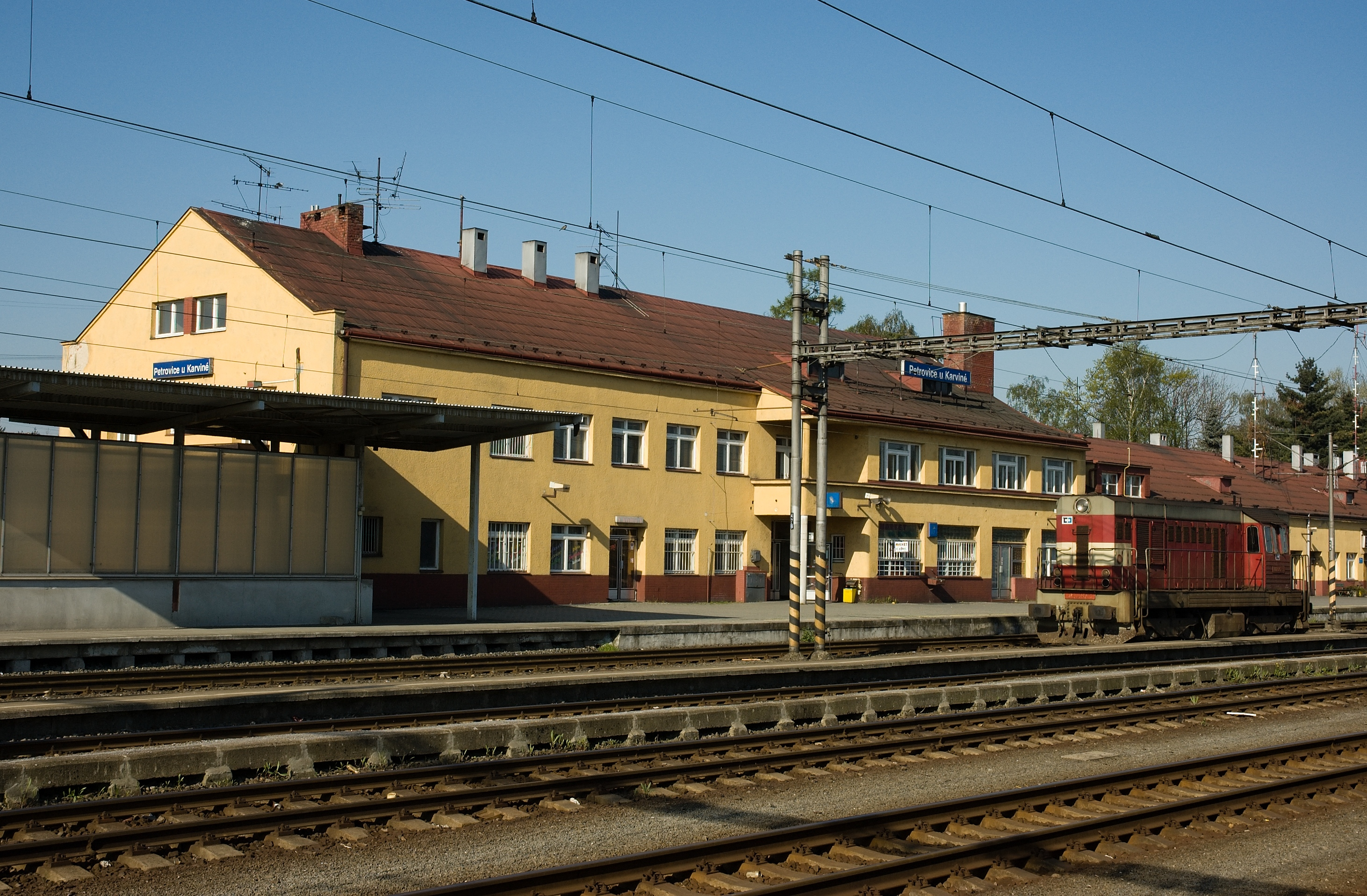
Train station

Petrovice u Karviné is the terminus and start of a railway line from/to Ostrava. The municipality is the site of a railway border crossing to Zebrzydowice in Poland. There are also three road border crossings and two pedestrian border crossings.

== Sport ==
In Petrovice u Karviné is a motocross racetrack.

== Sights ==
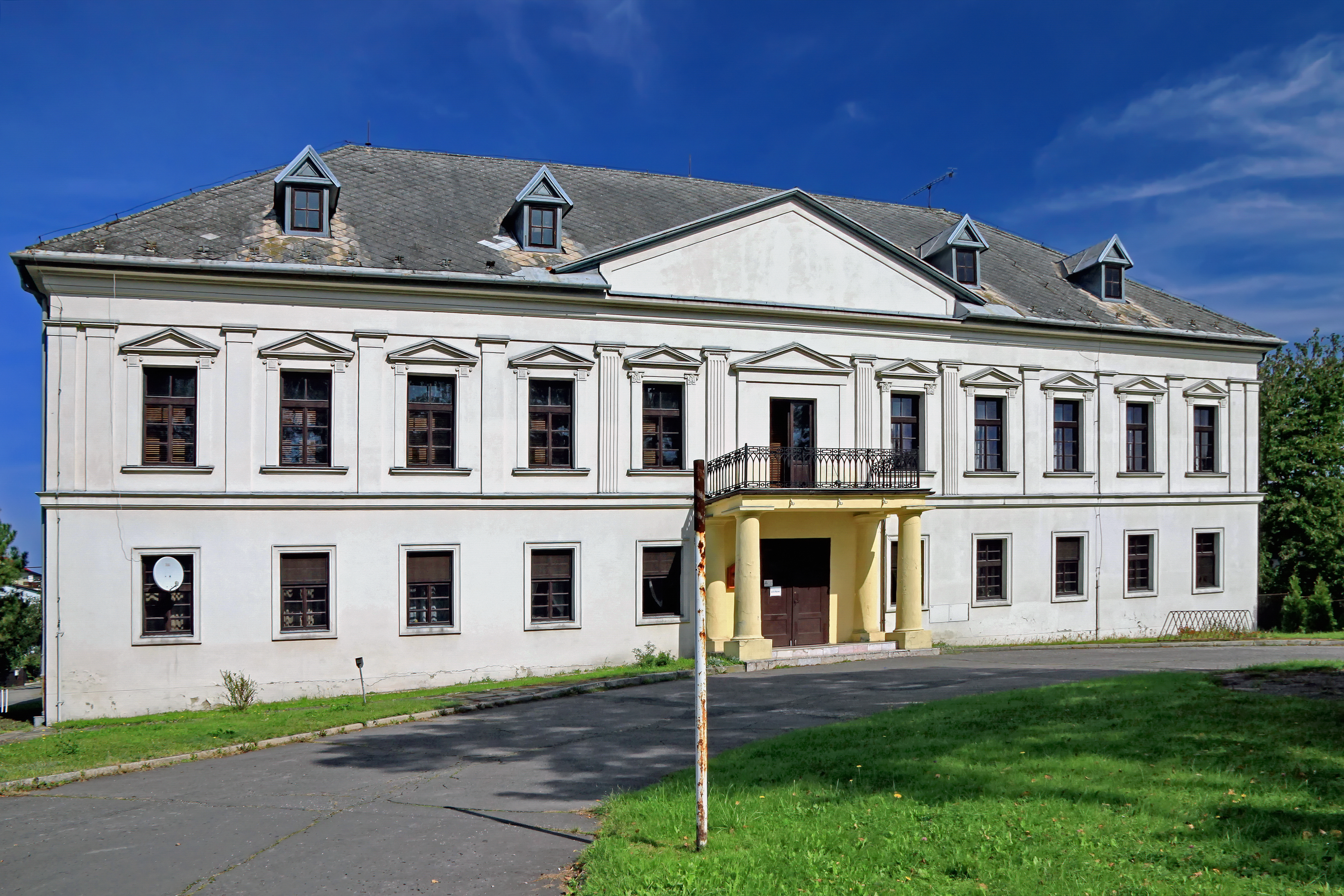
Petrovice Castle

The Church of Saint Martin dates from 1789. It replaced an old wooden church.

The Church of the Assumption of the Lord in Dolní Marklovice is a timbered church from 1739 with a conical gable tower. It is part of an exceptional group of Silesian wooden churches. In the interior is a unique decorative painting from the mid-18th century.

Petrovice Castle is an Empire manor house, built after 1796. It was built in the middle of an English park. Today it is used as a hotel.

== Twin towns – sister cities ==
Petrovice u Karviné is twinned with:

- Godów, Poland
- Zebrzydowice, Poland
