= Dolní Marklovice =

- cadastral area in the Czech Republic, municipal part of the Czech Republic
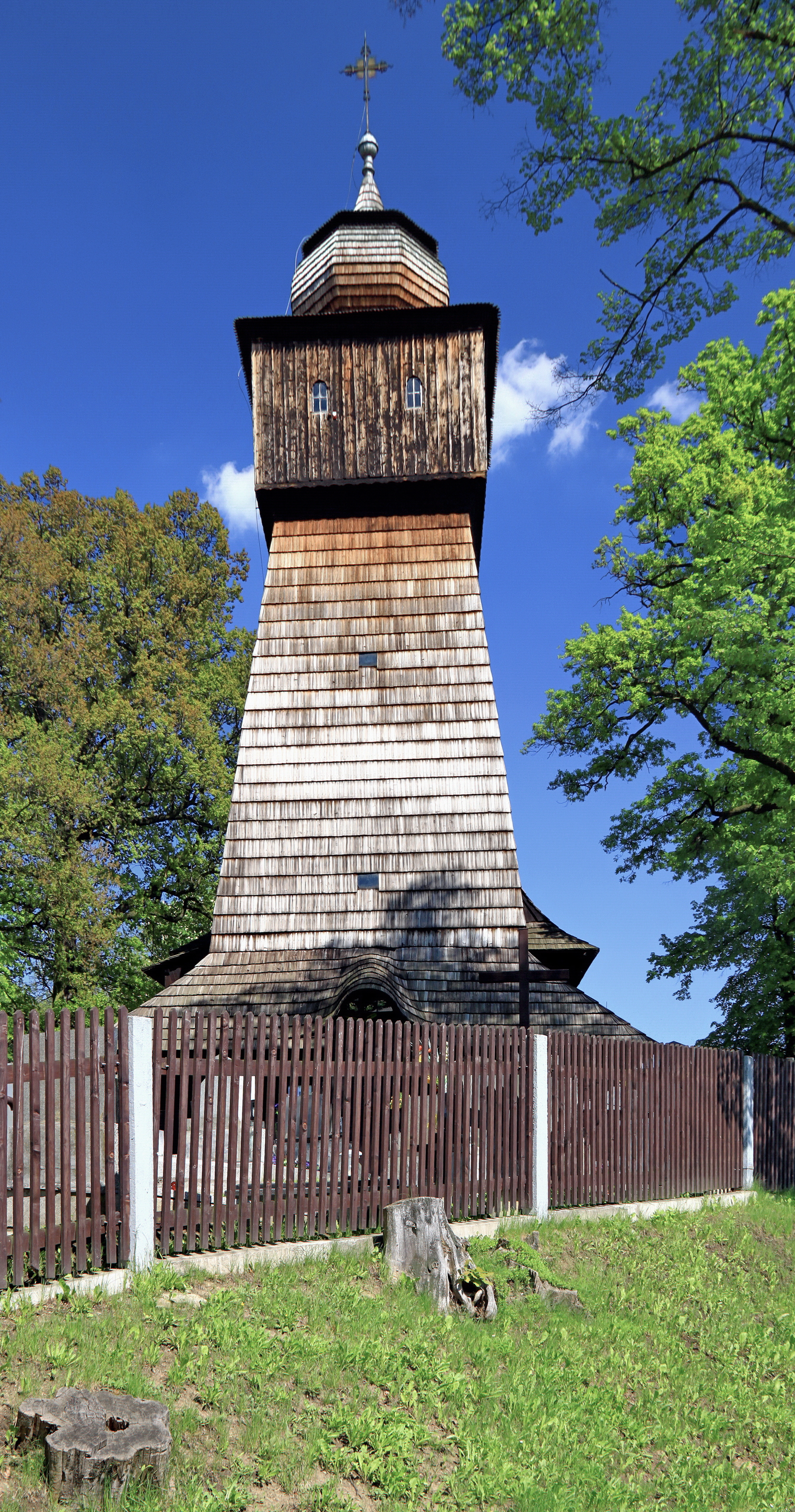

- Coordinates: 49°53′30″N 18°34′00″E
- Country: Czech Republic

Area
  - Total: 4.935 km^{2} (1.905 sq mi)

Population (26 March 2021)
  - Total: 1,476
  - Density: 300/km^{2} (770/sq mi)

Dolní Marklovice (Polish: Marklowice Dolne) is a village in Karviná District, Moravian-Silesian Region, Czech Republic. It was a separate municipality but became administratively a part of Petrovice u Karviné in 1952. Petrůvka River flows through the village.

== Etymology ==
The name of the village is patronymic in origin, derived from the German personal name Mark(e)l (≤ Markwart), whereas the ending -(ow)ice/(ow)itz is typically Slavic. The supplementary adjective Dolní (German: Nieder, Polish: Dolny) means Lower denoting its lower location in comparison to the sister settlement of Marklowice Górne (Czech: Horní Marklovice), in Poland.

== History ==
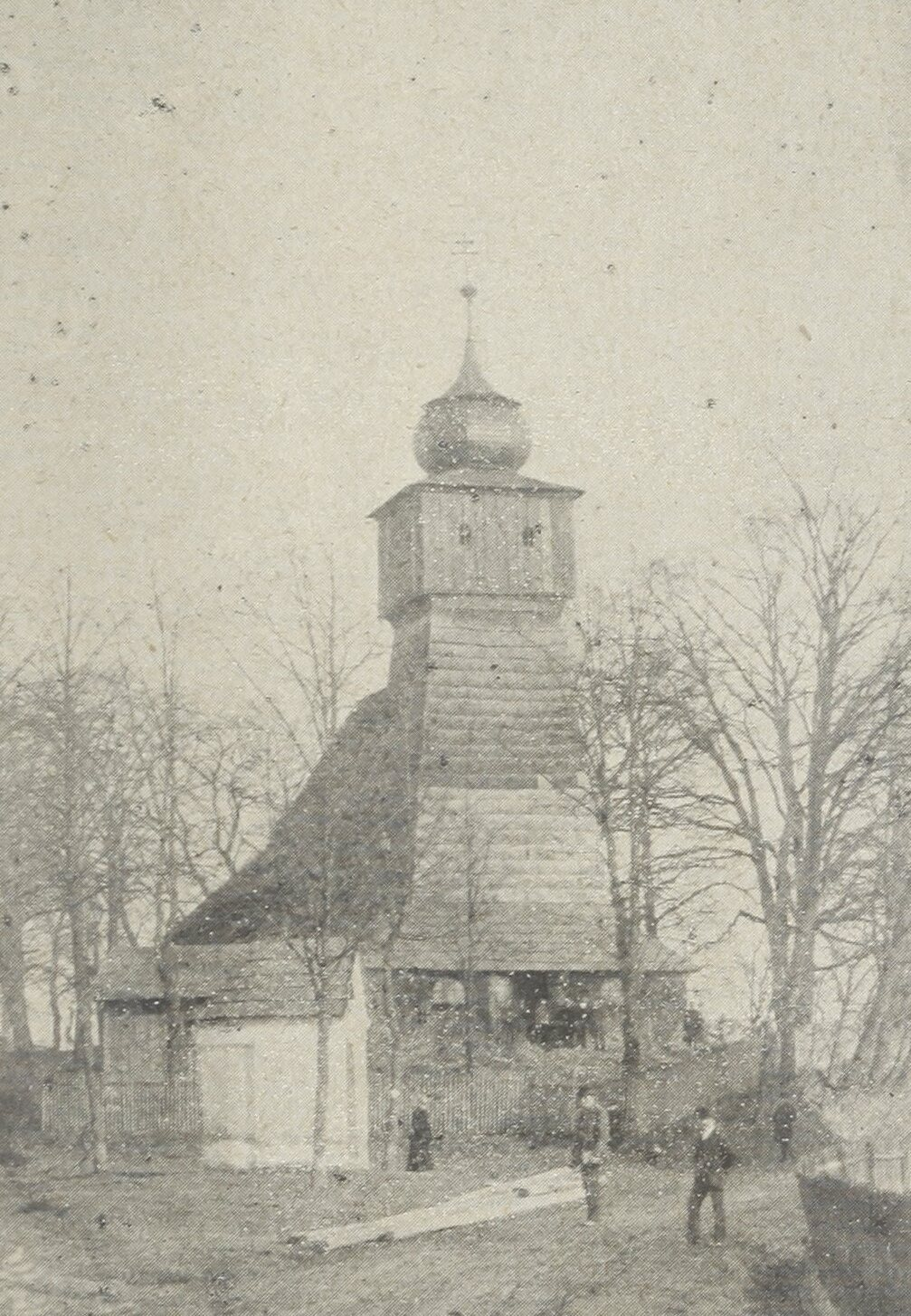
Church of Ascension of Jesus, before 1932

The village of Marklovice/Marklowice was first mentioned in a Latin document of Diocese of Wrocław called Liber fundationis episcopatus Vratislaviensis from around 1305 as item (in) Marklowitz debent esse triginta mansi. It meant that the village was supposed to pay a tithe from 30 smaller lans. The creation of the village was a part of a larger settlement campaign taking place in the late 13th century on the territory of what would later be known as Upper Silesia.

Politically the village belonged initially to the Duchy of Cieszyn, formed in 1290 in the process of feudal fragmentation of Poland and was ruled by a local branch of Silesian Piast dynasty. In 1327 the duchy became a fee of the Kingdom of Bohemia, which after 1526 became part of the Habsburg monarchy. It remained ruled by the Piast dynasty until 1653.

The village became a seat of a Catholic parish. First wooden church was built in 1360. It was mentioned in the register of Peter's Pence payment from 1447 among the 50 parishes of Cieszyn deanery as Merclowicz. After the 1540s Protestant Reformation prevailed in the Duchy of Cieszyn and a local Catholic church consecrated to Saint Nicholas was taken over by Lutherans. It was taken from them (as one from around fifty buildings) in the region by a special commission and given back to the Roman Catholic Church on 14 April 1654.

Differentiation of two parts of the village began in the 15th century. More distinctly they were split in the 17th century. After the Revolutions of 1848 in the Austrian Empire, a modern municipal division was introduced in the re-established Austrian Silesia. The two municipalities were subscribed at least since 1880 to political district and legal district of Freistadt. They were joined again at the end of the 19th century.

According to the censuses conducted in 1880, 1890, 1900 and 1910 the combined population of the two villages grew from 1,1941 in 1880 to 1,512 in 1910. The majority were Polish-speaking (between 98% and 99.6%), accompanied by German-speaking minority (at most 18 or 1.6% in 1880) and Czech-speaking people (at most 11 or 1% in 1890). In terms of religion, in 1910 the majority were Roman Catholics (98.4%), followed by Protestants (13 or 0.9%) and Jews (11 or 0.7%). The villages were also traditionally inhabited by Silesian Lachs, speaking Cieszyn Silesian dialect.

After World War I, the fall of Austria-Hungary, the Polish–Czechoslovak War and the division of Cieszyn Silesia in 1920, it was divided between these two countries, and Dolní Marklovice became a part of Czechoslovakia. Following the Munich Agreement, in October 1938 together with the Zaolzie region it was annexed by Poland, administratively organised in Frysztat County of Silesian Voivodeship. Marklowice Górne stayed in the separate powiat of Cieszyn. The villages was then annexed by Nazi Germany at the beginning of World War II. In 1942–1945, the Germans operated an internment camp in the village. After the war it was restored to Czechoslovakia.

== Church ==
The most important landmark of the village is a wooden Ascension of the Lord Church. It was built in 1739 of larch wood and consecrated to the Ascension of the Lord, as opposed to the earlier patron. There is a Mother of God painting from 1860 in the church. It was painted by Polish painter and publicist Edward Świerkiewicz. Church is under permanent conservationist supervision and systematically conserved. There is a cemetery surrounding the church. The landmark had been depicted in the works of many artists like Franciszek Świder, Rudolf Żebrok and Tadeusz Wratny.

== People ==
- Rudolf Paszek, Polish teacher and politician

== See also ==
- Polish minority in the Czech Republic
- Zaolzie
