= Albrechtice (Karviná District) =

Albrechtice Olbrachcice
- Municipality
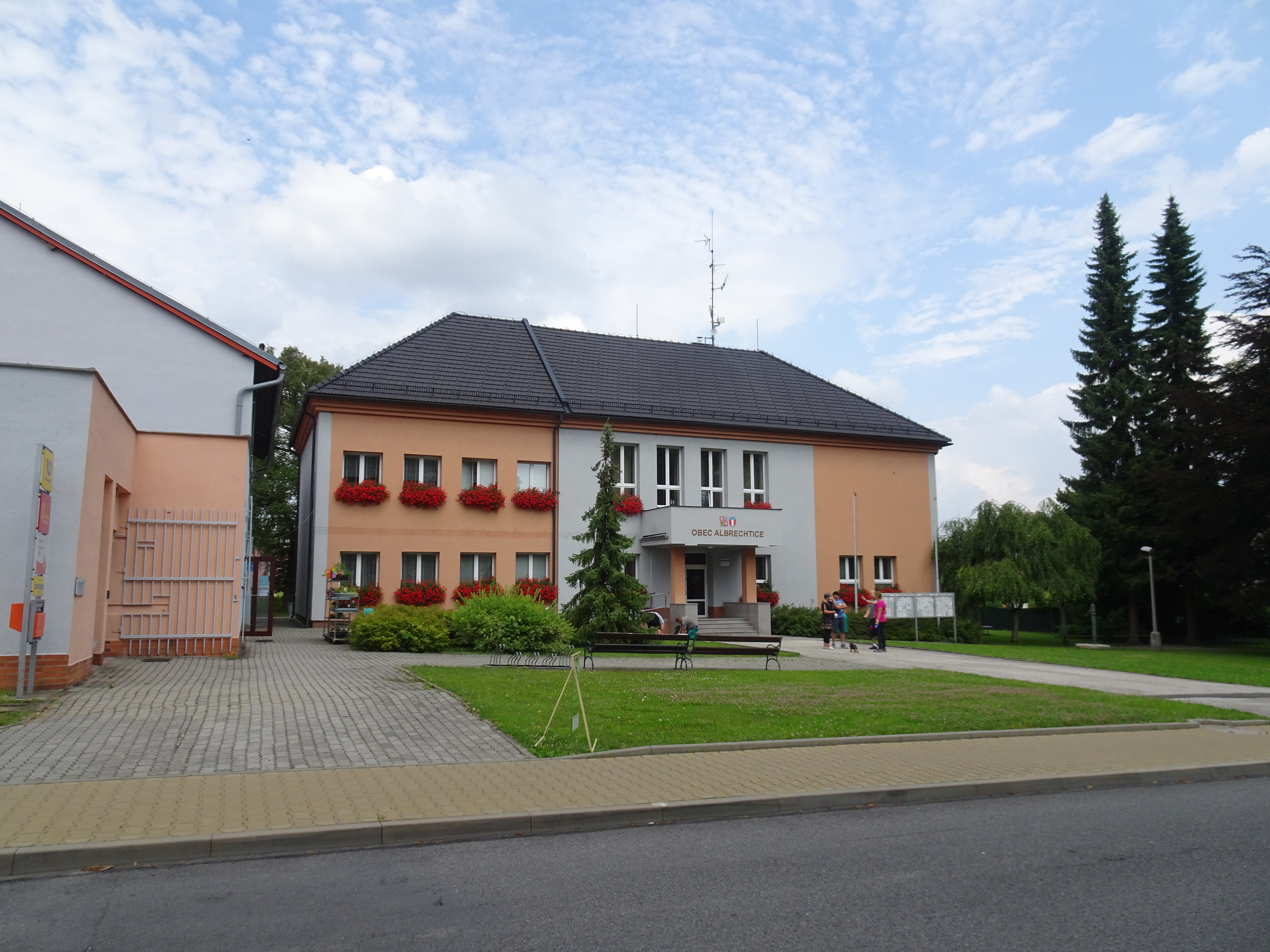
- Municipal office

- Flag Coat of arms

- Location in the Czech Republic
- Coordinates: 49°47′11″N 18°31′28″E
- Country: Czech Republic
- Region: Moravian-Silesian
- District: Karviná
- First mentioned: 1447

Area
  - Total: 12.69 km^{2} (4.90 sq mi)
- Elevation: 258 m (846 ft)

Population (2026-01-01)
  - Total: 3,782
  - Density: 298.0/km^{2} (771.9/sq mi)
- Time zone: UTC+1 (CET)
  - Summer (DST): UTC+2 (CEST)
- Postal code: 735 43
- Website: www.obecalbrechtice.cz

Albrechtice (Czech pronunciation: [albr̩ɛxcɪtsɛ]; Polish: Olbrachcice, German: Albersdorf) is a municipality and village in the Karviná District in the Moravian-Silesian Region of the Czech Republic. It has about 3,800 inhabitants. The municipality has a significant Polish minority.

== Etymology ==
The name of the village is derived from the personal name Albrecht, meaning "Albrecht's village". It could have been the sub-chamberlain of Duchy of Teschen, which is mentioned in 1322.

== Geography ==
Albrechtice is located about 8 kilometres (5 mi) south of Karviná and 15 km (9 mi) east of Ostrava. The municipality lies mostly in the Moravian-Silesian Foothills, only the northern part extends into the Ostrava Basin. The highest point is at 330 m (1,080 ft) above sea level. The Stonávka River flows through the municipality.

== History ==
The village was first mentioned in the register of Peter's Pence payment from 1447 among the 50 parishes of Teschen deanery as Albrothsdorff. Politically the village belonged to the Duchy of Teschen, which was since 1327 a fee of the Kingdom of Bohemia, which after 1526 became part of the Habsburg monarchy.

After the 1540s Protestant Reformation prevailed in the Duchy of Teschen and a local Catholic church was taken over by Lutherans. It was taken from them (as one from around fifty buildings in the region) by a special commission and given back to the Roman Catholic Church on 26 March 1654.

After the Revolutions of 1848 in the Austrian Empire, a modern municipal division was introduced in the re-established Austrian Silesia. The village as a municipality was subscribed at least since 1880 to political and legal district of Freistadt.

According to the censuses from 1880–1910, the population of the municipality grew from 1,070 in 1880 to 1,335 in 1910. In 1880, 96.9% of inhabitants declared being Czech-speaking, followed by 33 or 3.1% German-speakers. In the next censuses, majority were Polish-speaking (growing from 97.9% in 1890 to 99.5% in 1910), followed by diminishing number of German-speakers (from 23 or 2.1% in 1890 to six or 0.5% in 1910). In terms of religion, in 1910 the majority were Roman Catholics (899 or 67.3%), followed by Protestants (424 or 31.8%) and Jews (11 or 0.8%).

After World War I, the Polish–Czechoslovak War and the division of Cieszyn Silesia in 1920, the municipality became a part of Czechoslovakia. Following the Munich Agreement, in October 1938 together with the Trans-Olza region it was annexed by Poland, administratively organised in Frysztat County of Silesian Voivodeship. The municipality was then annexed by Nazi Germany at the beginning of World War II. After the war it was restored to Czechoslovakia.

== Demographics ==
According to the 2021 Census, Polish minority makes up 15.7% of the population.

Historical population

| Year | Pop. | ±% |
|---|---|---|
| 1869 | 1,015 | — |
| 1880 | 1,070 | +5.4% |
| 1890 | 1,102 | +3.0% |
| 1900 | 1,155 | +4.8% |
| 1910 | 1,335 | +15.6% |

| Year | Pop. | ±% |
|---|---|---|
| 1921 | 1,387 | +3.9% |
| 1930 | 1,641 | +18.3% |
| 1950 | 1,602 | −2.4% |
| 1961 | 2,184 | +36.3% |
| 1970 | 2,559 | +17.2% |

| Year | Pop. | ±% |
|---|---|---|
| 1980 | 3,616 | +41.3% |
| 1991 | 3,904 | +8.0% |
| 2001 | 4,071 | +4.3% |
| 2011 | 3,795 | −6.8% |
| 2021 | 3,742 | −1.4% |

Source: Censuses

== Transport ==
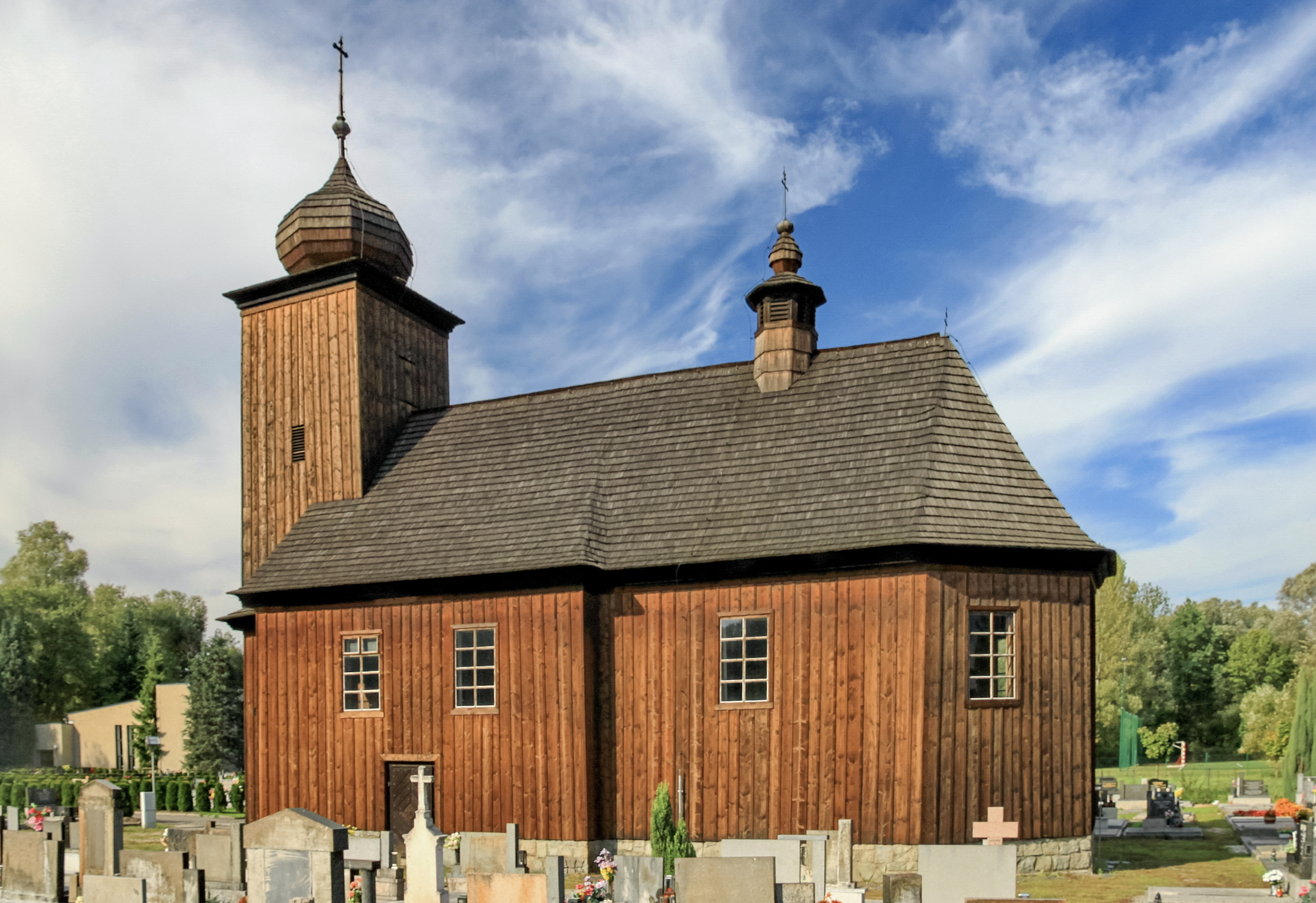
Church of Saints Peter and Paul

Albrechtice is located on the railway line heading from Opava and Ostrava to Český Těšín.

== Sights ==
The most important monument is the Church of Saints Peter and Paul. It is a wooden Baroque building from 1766.

== Notable people ==
- Bruno Matykiewicz (born 1959), Polish weightlifter; lives here
