= Doubrava (Karviná District) =

- Municipality
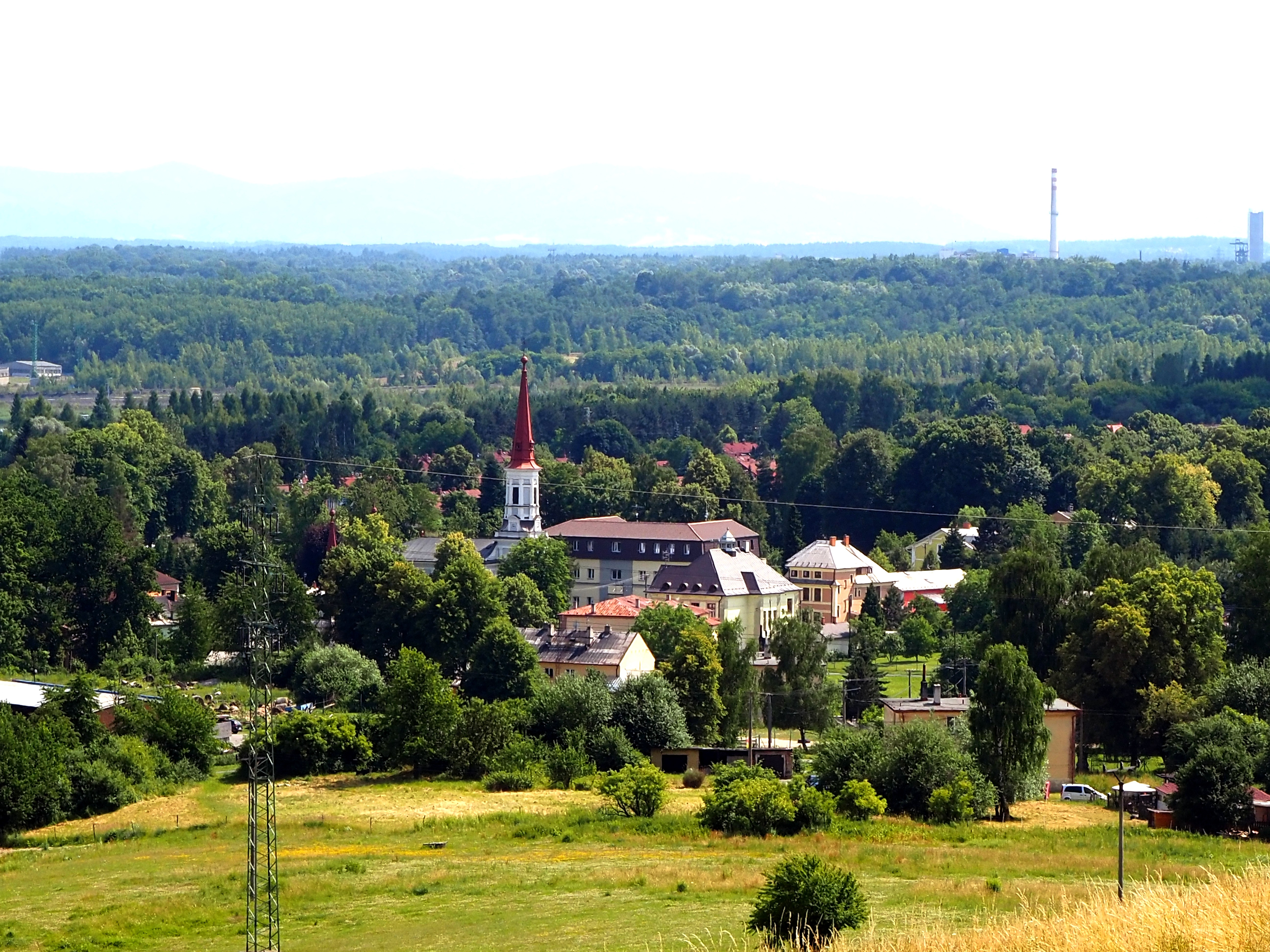
- General view

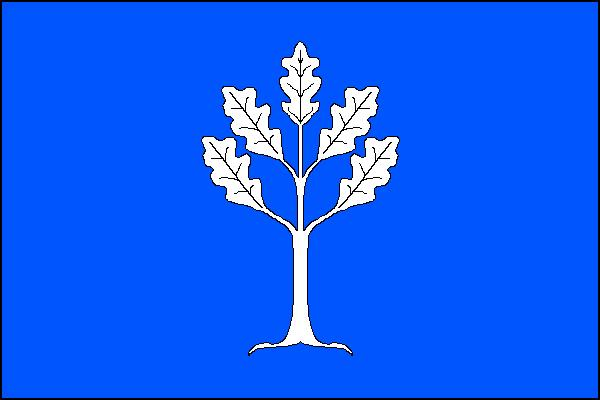
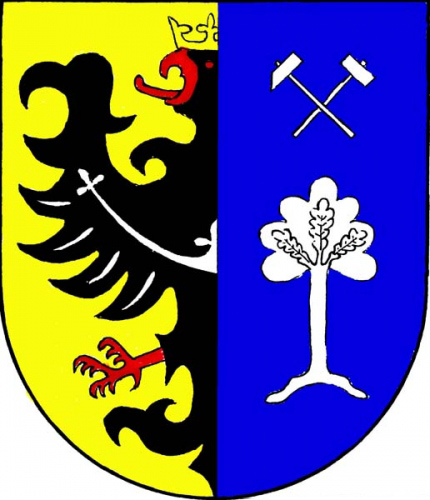
- Flag Coat of arms

- Location in the Czech Republic
- Coordinates: 49°51′31″N 18°28′49″E
- Country: Czech Republic
- Region: Moravian-Silesian
- District: Karviná
- First mentioned: 1229

Area
  - Total: 7.78 km^{2} (3.00 sq mi)
- Elevation: 235 m (771 ft)

Population (2026-01-01)
  - Total: 1,125
  - Density: 145/km^{2} (375/sq mi)
- Time zone: UTC+1 (CET)
  - Summer (DST): UTC+2 (CEST)
- Postal code: 735 33
- Website: www.doubrava.cz

Doubrava (Polish: Dąbrowa, German: Dombrau) is a municipality and village in Karviná District in the Moravian-Silesian Region of the Czech Republic. It has about 1,100 inhabitants.

== Etymology ==
The name comes from the Slavic word dúbrava, which means 'oak forest'. Between 1920 and 1924, the municipality was named Dombrová.

== Geography ==
Doubrava is located about 3 kilometres (2 mi) west of Karviná and 12 km (7 mi) east of Ostrava. It lies in the Ostrava Basin in the historical region of Cieszyn Silesia. There are several fishponds in the municipality.

== History ==
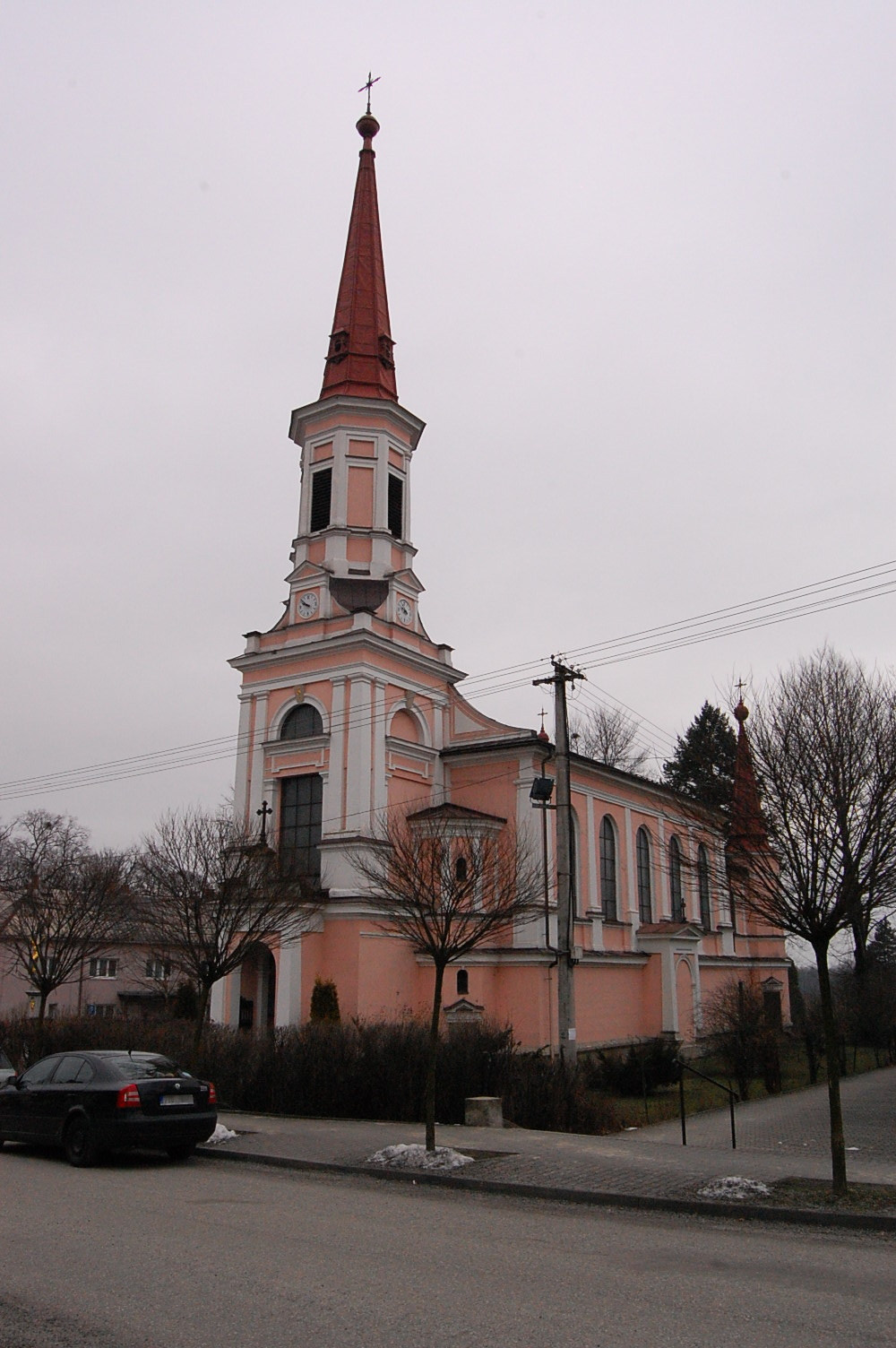
Church of Saint Hedwig

It is not clear when the village was founded, according to historians, it could have been around 1150. The first written mention of Doubrava is in a document of Pope Gregory IX issued in 1229 among villages belonging to Benedictine abbey in Tyniec, as Dubrowa. In 1268 it was bestowed by Władysław Opolski to the newly established Orlová monastery.

Politically it belonged then to the Duchy of Opole and Racibórz and Castellany of Cieszyn, which was ruled by a local branch of Piast dynasty. In 1327 the duchy became a fee of the Kingdom of Bohemia, which after 1526 became part of the Habsburg monarchy. In 1573 it was sold as one of a dozen villages and the town of Freistadt and formed a state country split from the Duchy of Teschen.

An important milestone in the history of the village was the discovery of coal. Mining was started in 1822 by Baron Anton Mattencloit, the then owner of Doubrava. He sold the shaft to Salomon Mayer von Rothschild in 1845, who had second mining pit dug in 1854 and christened the pits Eleonora and Bettina. After World War II, they were merged under one mine called Doubrava Mine and became part of the OKD company.

After Revolutions of 1848 in the Austrian Empire a modern municipal division was introduced in the re-established Austrian Silesia. The village as a municipality was subscribed at first to the political district of Teschen and the legal district of Freistadt, which in 1868 became an independent political district.

According to the censuses conducted in 1880–1910, the population of the municipality grew from 2,382 in 1880 to 5,660 in 1910. According to the native language, at first majority were Czech-speaking (85.6% in 1880 and 66.2% in 1890, then dropping to 19.6% in 1900 and again growing to 34.7% in 1910), later Polish-speaking (at first 12.2% in 1880, then increased to 62.8% in 1910). They were accompanied by a German-speaking minority (4% in 1890, 2.5% in 1910). In terms of religion in 1910, the majority were Roman Catholics (5,159 or 91.1%), followed by Protestants (354 or 6.3%) and Jews (134 or 2.4%).

After World War I, Polish–Czechoslovak War and the division of Cieszyn Silesia in 1920, the village became a part of Czechoslovakia. Following the Munich Agreement, in October 1938 together with the Trans-Olza region it was annexed by Poland, administratively organised in Frysztat County of Silesian Voivodeship. The village was then annexed by Nazi Germany at the beginning of World War II. After the war it was restored to Czechoslovakia.

In 1974, Doubrava was administratively joined to the town of Orlová. Living conditions in Doubrava deteriorated during the Communist era as a result of extensive coal mining. In 1990, it once again became an independent municipality.

The coal mining ended here in 2007. The tower of the Bettina coal mine was detonated in 2006, the tower of Eleonora coal mine was detonated in 2007.

== Demographics ==
Historical population

Year	Pop.	±%
1869	1,752	—
1880	2,382	+36.0%
1890	3,086	+29.6%
1900	4,327	+40.2%
1910	5,660	+30.8%

Year	Pop.	±%
1921	5,220	−7.8%
1930	4,934	−5.5%
1950	4,452	−9.8%
1961	4,341	−2.5%
1970	3,472	−20.0%

Year	Pop.	±%
1980	2,457	−29.2%
1991	1,812	−26.3%
2001	1,811	−0.1%
2011	1,310	−27.7%
2021	1,142	−12.8%

Source: Censuses

== Transport ==
There are no railways or major roads passing through the municipality.

== Sights ==
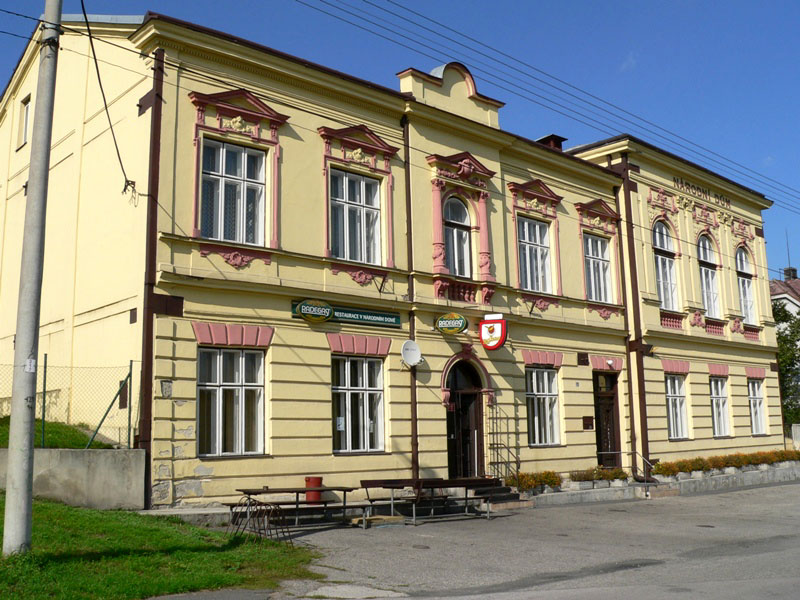
National House

The most important landmark is the Church of Saint Hedwig. This Roman Catholic church was built in the Neo-Romanesque style in 1894–1898. The neighbouring rectory building also dates from 1898.

The Czechoslovak Hussite church was built in 1928. It represents interwar architecture influenced by purism and constructivism.

The National House is an architecturally valuable building. It was built in 1903 to serve cultural and sporting purposes.

== Notable people ==
- Jan Buzek (1874–1940), Polish physician and politician; worked here
- Józef Kiedroń (1879–1932), Polish engineer and politician; worked here
- Waldemar Semelka (1920–1941), flying ace

== Gallery ==
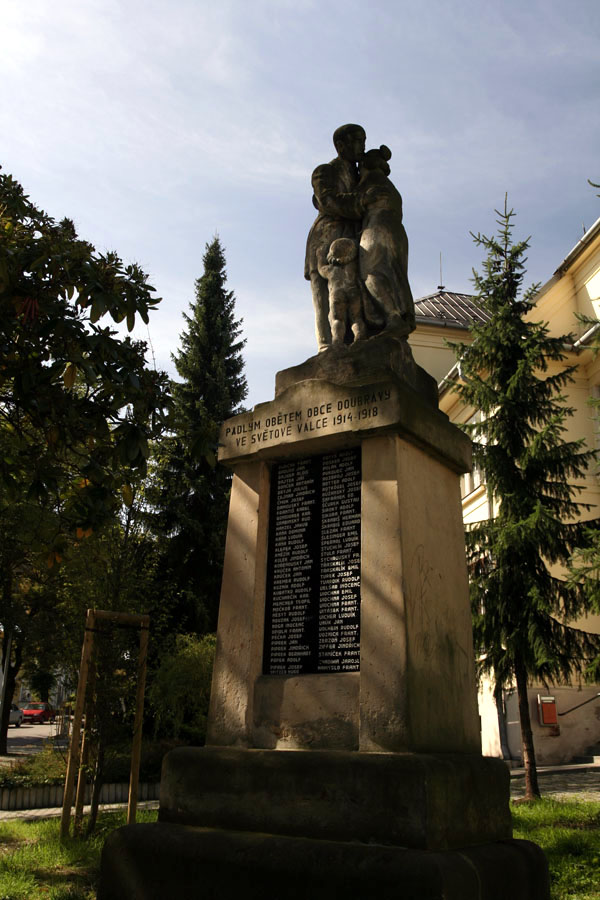
Memorial to local World War I victims

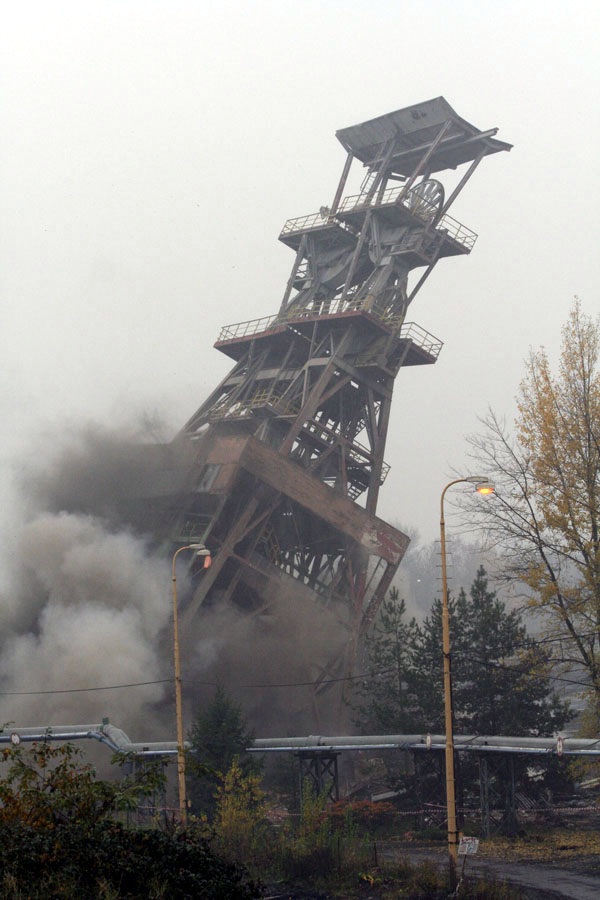
Detonation of the tower of Eleonora coal mine

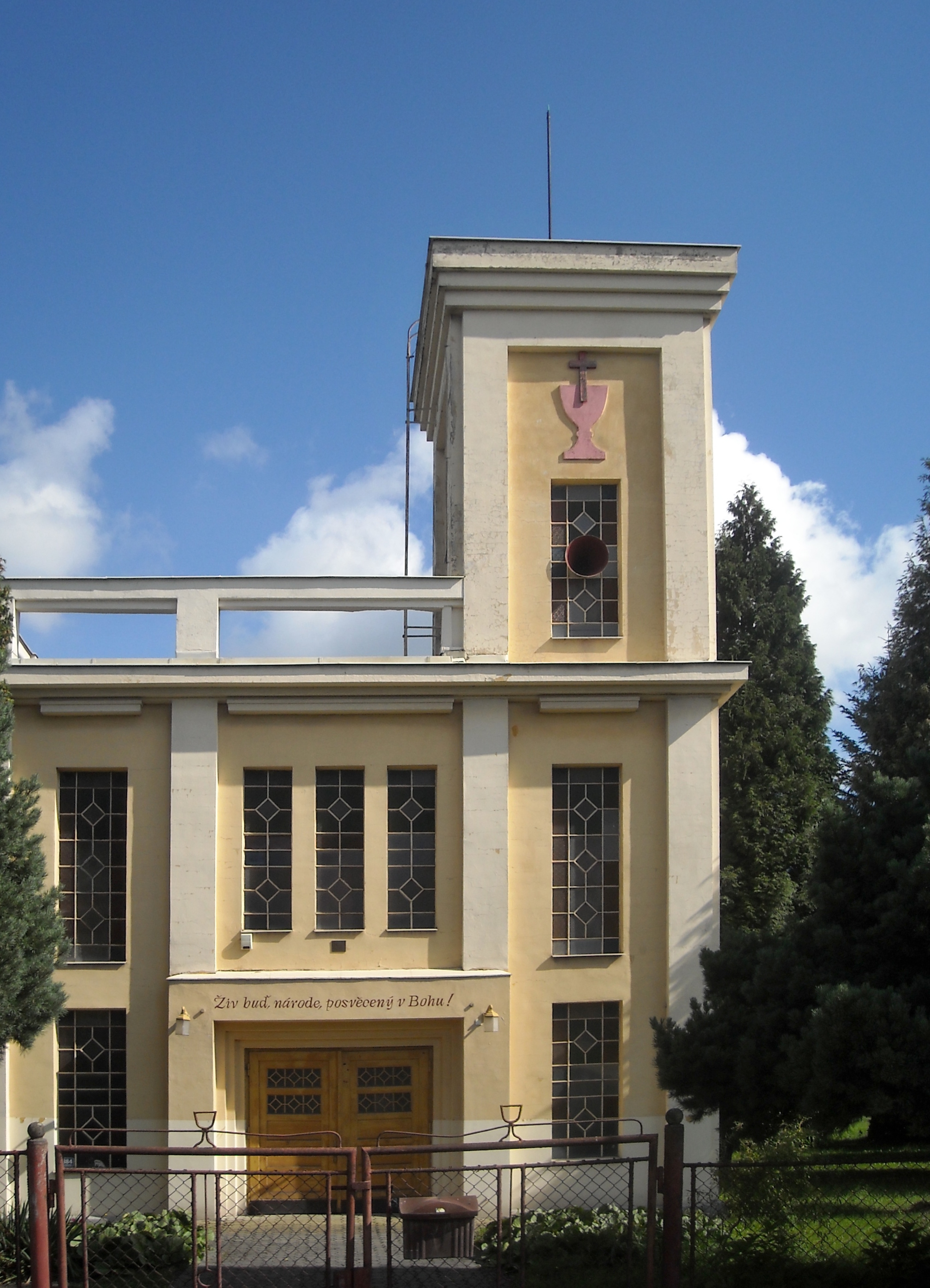
Czechoslovak Hussite church
