= Marklowice Górne =

- Village
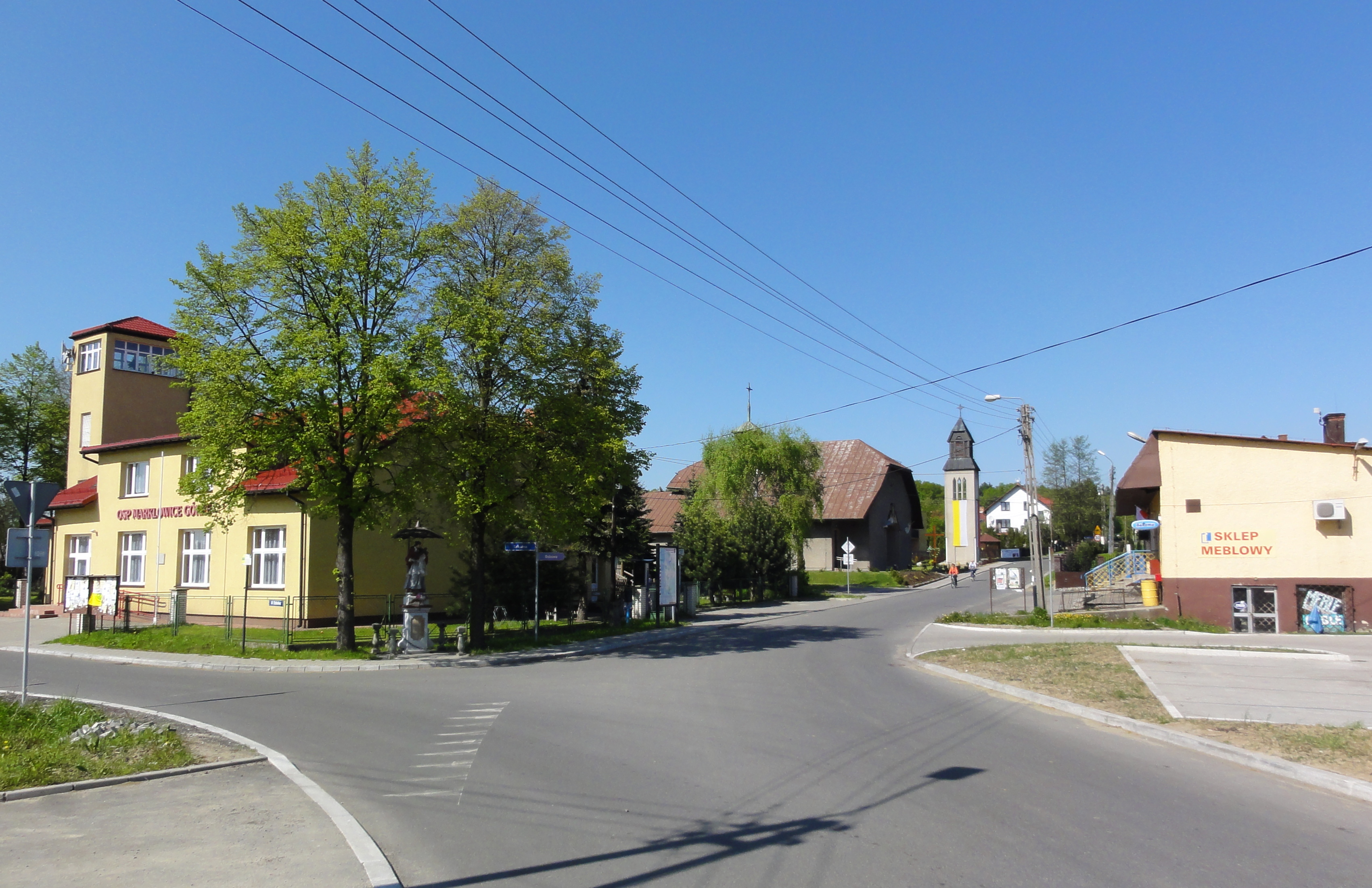
- Village's centre

- Location within Poland
- Coordinates: 49°53′7.52″N 18°35′12.66″E
- Country: Poland
- Voivodeship: Silesian
- County: Cieszyn
- Gmina: Zebrzydowice
- First mentioned: 1305

Government
  - Mayor: Tadeusz Guz

Area
  - Total: 4.64 km^{2} (1.79 sq mi)

Population
  - Total: 920
  - Density: 200/km^{2} (510/sq mi)
- Time zone: UTC+1 (CET)
  - Summer (DST): UTC+2 (CEST)
- Car plates: SCI

Marklowice Górne [marklɔˈvit͡sɛ ˈɡurnɛ] is a village in Gmina Zebrzydowice, Cieszyn County, Silesian Voivodeship, southern Poland. Piotrówka River flows through the village.

== Etymology ==
The name of the village is patronymic in origin, derived from the German personal name Mark(e)l (≤ Markwart), whereas the ending -(ow)ice/(ow)itz is typically Slavic. The supplementary adjective Górne (German: Ober, Czech: Horní) means Upper denoting its upper location in comparison to sister settlement: Dolní Marklovice (Polish: Marklowice Dolne), in the Czech Republic.

== History ==
The village of Marklowice was first mentioned in a Latin document of Diocese of Wrocław called Liber fundationis episcopatus Vratislaviensis from around 1305 as item (in) Marklowitz debent esse triginta mansi. It meant that the village was supposed to pay tithe from 30 smaller lans. The creation of the village was a part of a larger settlement campaign taking place in the late 13th century on the territory of what would later be known as Upper Silesia.

Politically the village belonged initially to the Duchy of Cieszyn, formed in 1290 in the process of feudal fragmentation of Poland and was ruled by a local branch of Silesian Piast dynasty. In 1327 the duchy became a fee of the Kingdom of Bohemia, which after 1526 became part of the Habsburg monarchy. It remained ruled by the Piast dynasty until 1653.

Differentiation of two parts of the village began in the 15th century. Marklowice Górne was first mentioned in 1467 as wes wrchnye Marklowycze and then in 1950 as wes Horny Marklowicze. More distinctly in the 17th century the village was split into the two parts, Marklowice Dolne and Marklowice Górne. After the Revolutions of 1848 in the Austrian Empire, a modern municipal division was introduced in the re-established Austrian Silesia. The two municipalities were subscribed at least since 1880 to political district and legal district of Freistadt. They were joined again at the end of the 19th century.

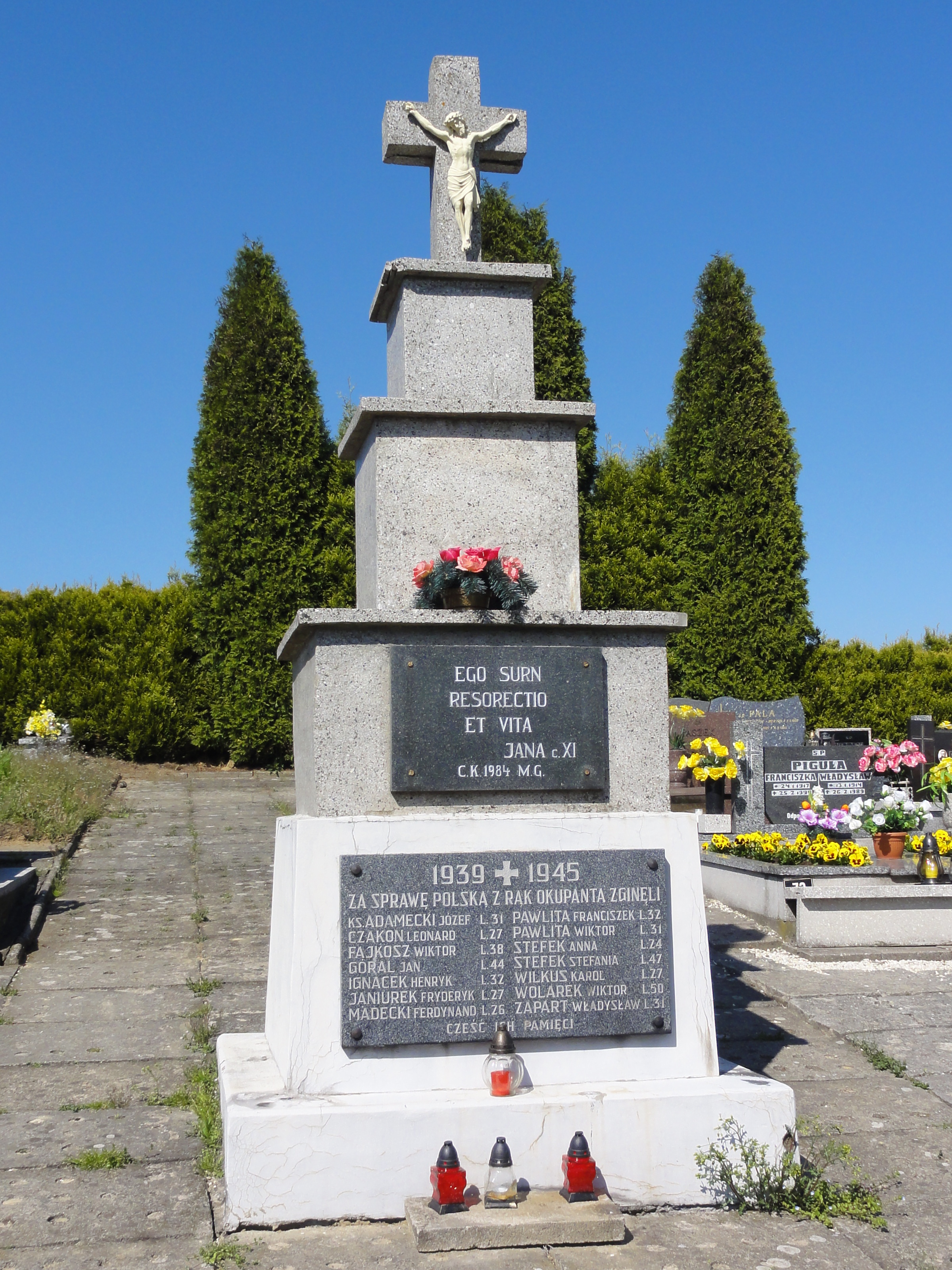
Memorial to local victims of World War II

According to the censuses conducted in 1880, 1890, 1900 and 1910 the combined population of the two villages grew from 1,1941 in 1880 to 1,512 in 1910. The majority were Polish-speaking (between 98% and 99.6%), accompanied by German-speaking minority (at most 18 or 1.6% in 1880) and Czech-speaking people (at most 11 or 1% in 1890). In terms of religion, in 1910 the majority were Roman Catholics (98.4%), followed by Protestants (13 or 0.9%) and Jews (11 or 0.7%). The village was also traditionally inhabited by Silesian Lachs, speaking Cieszyn Silesian dialect.

After division of Cieszyn Silesia between Czechoslovakia and Poland in 1920, it was divided between these two countries. They were briefly reunited in the same country 1938–39 after Poland's annexation of Zaolzie, although as two separate gminas in two different powiats: Cieszyn (Marklowice Górne) and Frysztat (Marklowice Dolne). Today's Marklowice Górne is an eastern part of that village. Western part of the village is now known as Dolní Marklovice and lies in the Czech Republic.

== See also ==
- Zaolzie
