= Rudolf Paszek =

Member of the Silesian Parliament
- In office 1938–1939

Personal details
- Born: 19 March 1894 Marklowice Dolne, Austria-Hungary
- Died: 29 November 1969 (aged 75) Český Těšín, Czechoslovakia
- Resting place: Český Těšín
- Spouse: Ludwika Klement

Rudolf Paszek (19 March 1894 – 29 November 1969) was a Polish teacher, national activist, community organizer and local politician. He was a member of various organizations active amongst the Polish minority in interbellum Czechoslovakia.

== BIography ==
Paszek was born in the family of Mateusz Paszek, a coal miner employed at Gabriela Mine in Karviná. He gained the education as a teacher. When World War I broke out, Paszek was conscripted to the Austro-Hungarian Army. He fought in Albania, where he was wounded. After returning from the war, Paszek continued his teaching career, becoming a principal of a Polish school in Slezská Ostrava in 1921. Five years later he was named a principal of a Polish school in Jablunkov.

Paszek was active in the life of the Polish community of Jablunkov. He was a member of several organizations, including the Association of Silesian Catholics, Sokół and scouting organizations. In 1932, Paszek was elected as a mayor of Jablunkov. He held this function until October 1938.

After the annexation of Trans-Olza region to Poland in 1938, President Ignacy Mościcki named him a deputy of the Silesian Parliament, where Paszek was a deputy until the outbreak of World War II. He was awarded the Knight's Cross of the Order of Polonia Restituta. In November 1938 he entered the local Trans-Olza chapter of the Camp of National Unity.

In October 1939, Paszek was arrested by Nazi Germans and imprisoned. In April 1940 he was moved to the Sachsenhausen concentration camp, and in September subsequently transferred to Dachau concentration camp, where he was incarcerated for the rest of the war.

In 1948, he moved with his family to Český Těšín, where he was named as a principal of Polish school there. Three years later Paszek suffered a heart attack, as a result he retired from his job. He died on 29 November 1969, suffering a fourth stroke.
