= Rychvald =

- Town
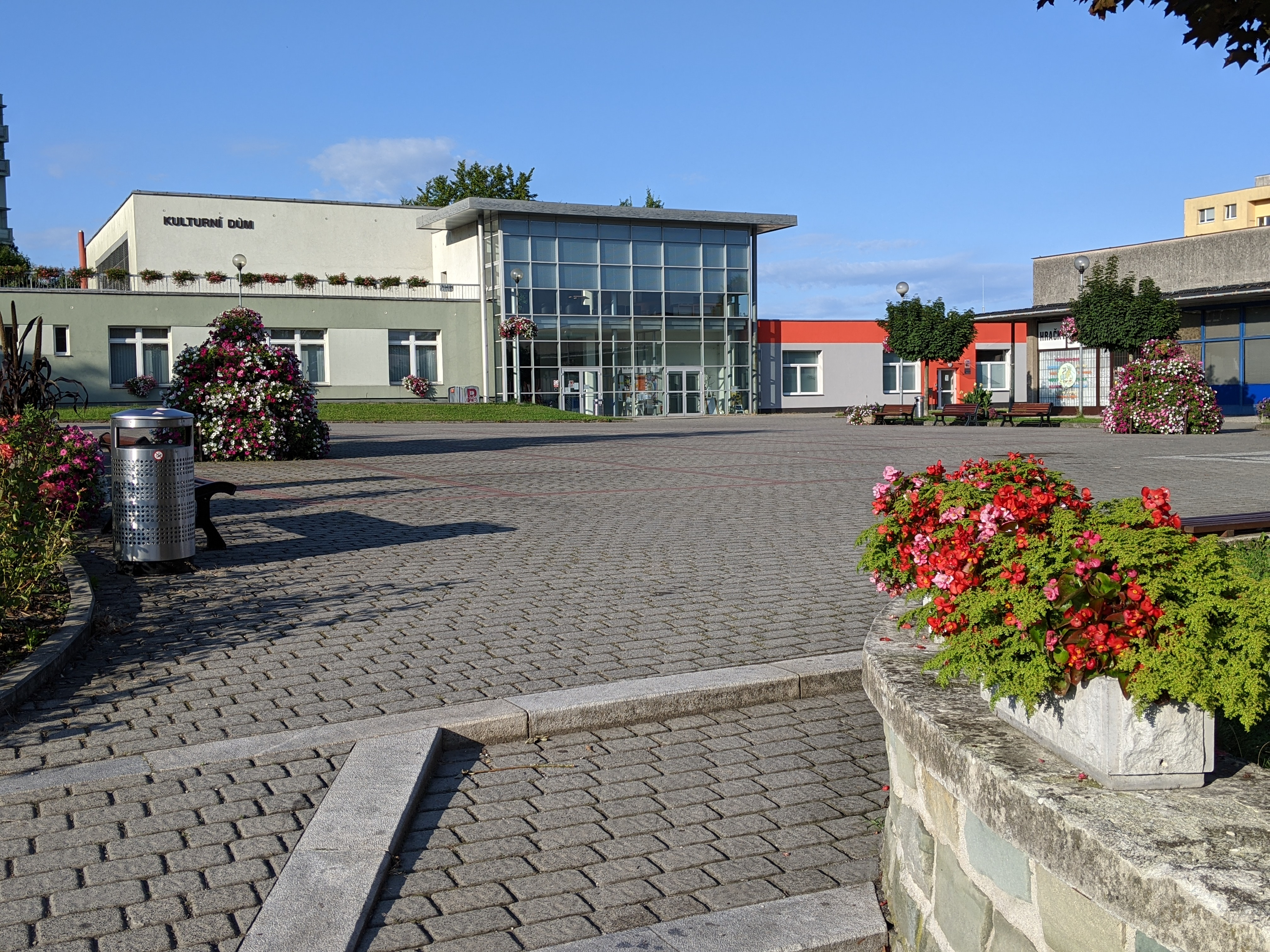
- Town square

- Flag Coat of arms

- Location in the Czech Republic
- Coordinates: 49°51′58″N 18°22′35″E
- Country: Czech Republic
- Region: Moravian-Silesian
- District: Karviná
- First mentioned: 1305

Government
  - Mayor: Dagmar Pížová (ANO)

Area
  - Total: 17.02 km^{2} (6.57 sq mi)
- Elevation: 220 m (720 ft)

Population (2026-01-01)
  - Total: 7,823
  - Density: 459.6/km^{2} (1,190/sq mi)
- Time zone: UTC+1 (CET)
  - Summer (DST): UTC+2 (CEST)
- Postal code: 735 32
- Website: rychvald.cz

Rychvald (Czech pronunciation: [ˈrɪxvalt]; Polish: Rychwałd, German: Reichwaldau) is a town in Karviná District in the Moravian-Silesian Region of the Czech Republic. It has about 7,800 inhabitants.

== Geography ==
Rychvald is located northeast of Ostrava, in its immediate vicinity. It is urbanistically fused with Ostrava-Michálkovice. It lies in the Ostrava Basin, in the historical region of Cieszyn Silesia. The territory of Rychvald is rich in fishponds.

== History ==
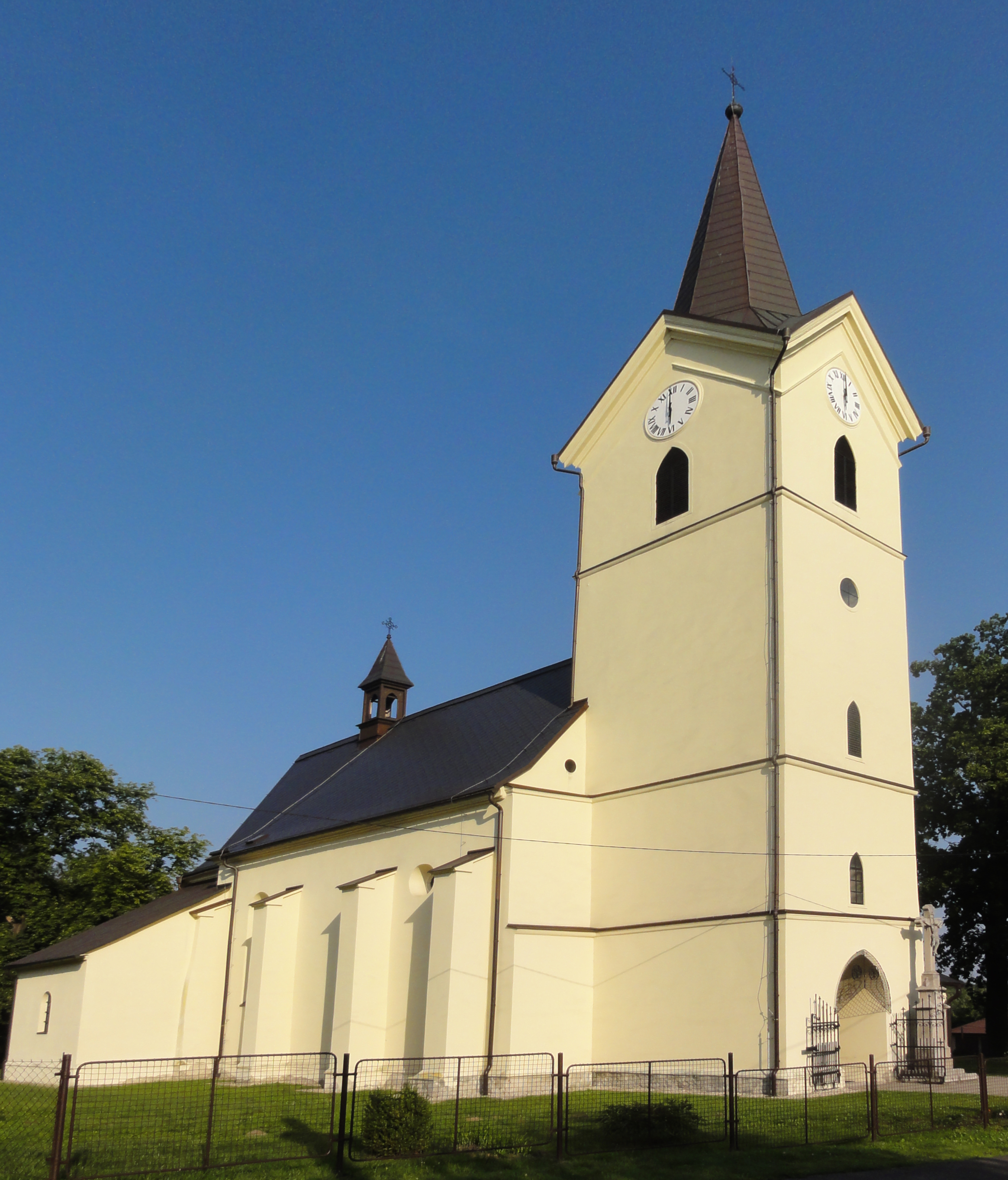
Church of Saint Anne

The village was first mentioned in a Latin document of Diocese of Wrocław called Liber fundationis episcopatus Vratislaviensis from 1305 as Richinwalde. The village could have been founded during the colonisation by Benedictine monks from the Orlová monastery, probably at the end of the 13th century.

Politically the village belonged initially to the Duchy of Teschen, formed in 1290 in the process of feudal fragmentation of Poland and was ruled by a local branch of Piast dynasty. In 1327 the duchy became a fee of Kingdom of Bohemia, which after 1526 became part of the Habsburg monarchy.

The village became a seat of a Catholic parish, mentioned in the register of Peter's Pence payment from 1447 among 50 parishes of Teschen deaconry as Reychenwald.

In 1573, a part of the Duchy of Tetschen with Rychvald was sold to the Barský of Bašť family. Bernard Barský of Bašť had built a castle here in 1575–1577 and chose Rychvald as his family seat. The family owned Rychvald until 1630, then several aristocratic families passed into his ownership. From the mid-18th century to 1898, it was in possession of the Moennich and the Larisch von Moennich family, who were its most notable owners. During their rule, the castle was gradually modified and reconstructed.

For centuries, Rychvald was an agricultural village. In the 19th century, the region saw a boom in coal mining and the character of the village began to change.

After World War I, Polish–Czechoslovak War and the division of Cieszyn Silesia in 1920, it became a part of Czechoslovakia. Following the Munich Agreement, in October 1938 together with the Trans-Olza region it was annexed by Poland, administratively organised in Frysztat County of Silesian Voivodeship. It was then annexed by Nazi Germany at the beginning of World War II. After the war it was restored to Czechoslovakia.

In 1935, Rychvald was promoted to a market town. In 1985 Rychvald became a town.

== Demographics ==
According to the 2021 Census, the previously numerous Polish minority made up only 1.3% of the population.

Historical population

Year	Pop.	±%
1869	2,277	—
1880	2,603	+14.3%
1890	3,149	+21.0%
1900	4,556	+44.7%
1910	6,163	+35.3%

Year	Pop.	±%
1921	6,406	+3.9%
1930	7,190	+12.2%
1950	5,963	−17.1%
1961	6,610	+10.9%
1970	7,051	+6.7%

Year	Pop.	±%
1980	7,149	+1.4%
1991	6,645	−7.0%
2001	6,769	+1.9%
2011	7,093	+4.8%
2021	7,456	+5.1%

Source: Censuses

== Transport ==
There are no major roads passing through the municipality. The railway that runs through the territory is not used for passenger transport.

== Sights ==
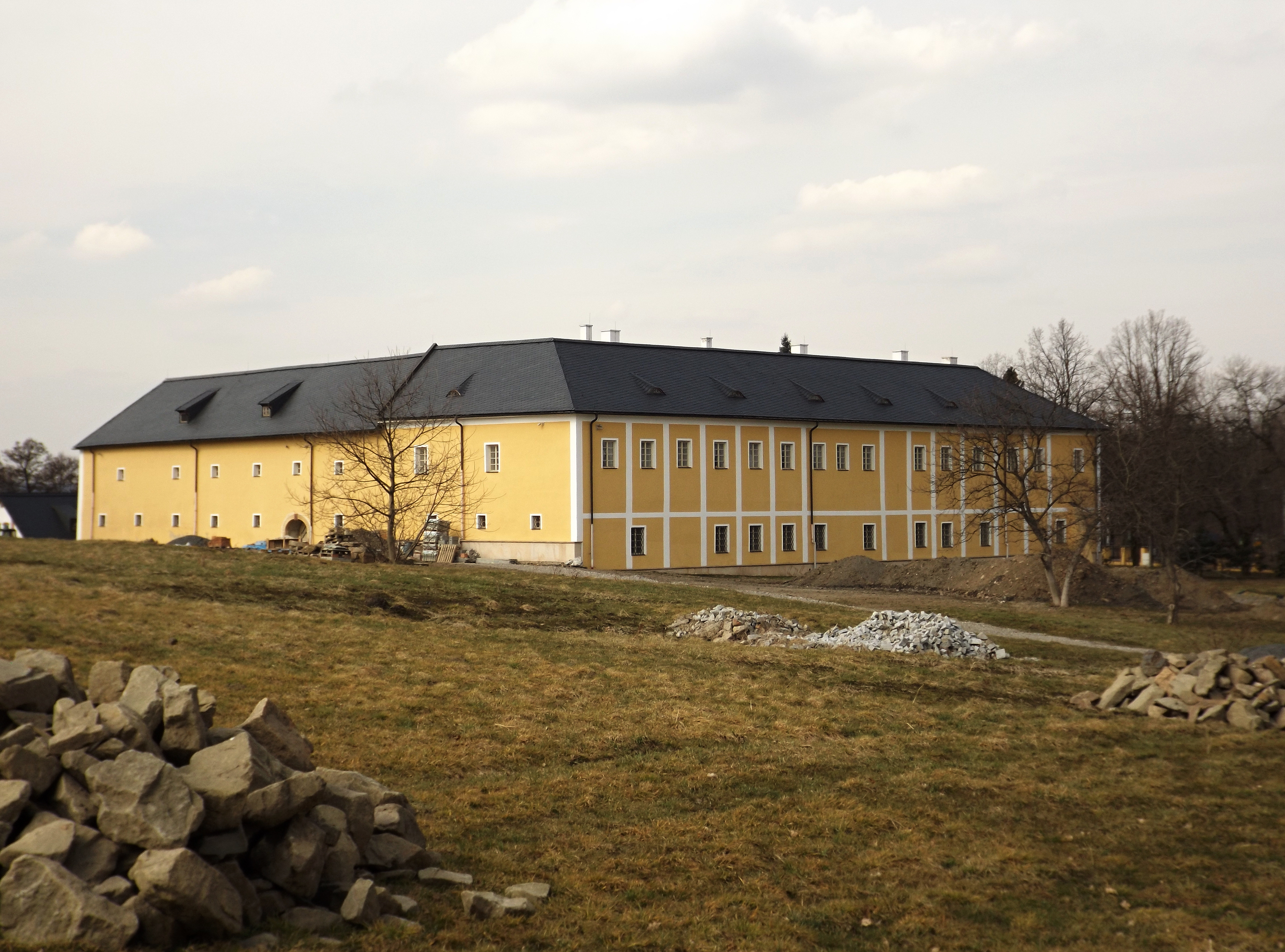
Starý Dvůr Castle

The Starý Dvůr Castle is the oldest building in Rychvald. This Renaissance castle was built in 1575–1577. Today it is in private ownership and inaccessible.

The main landmark of the town centre is the Church of Saint Anne. It dates from 1595.

== Notable people ==
- Přemysl Kočí (1917–2003), opera singer, actor and stage director
