= Karviná District =

Karviná District Okres Karviná
- District
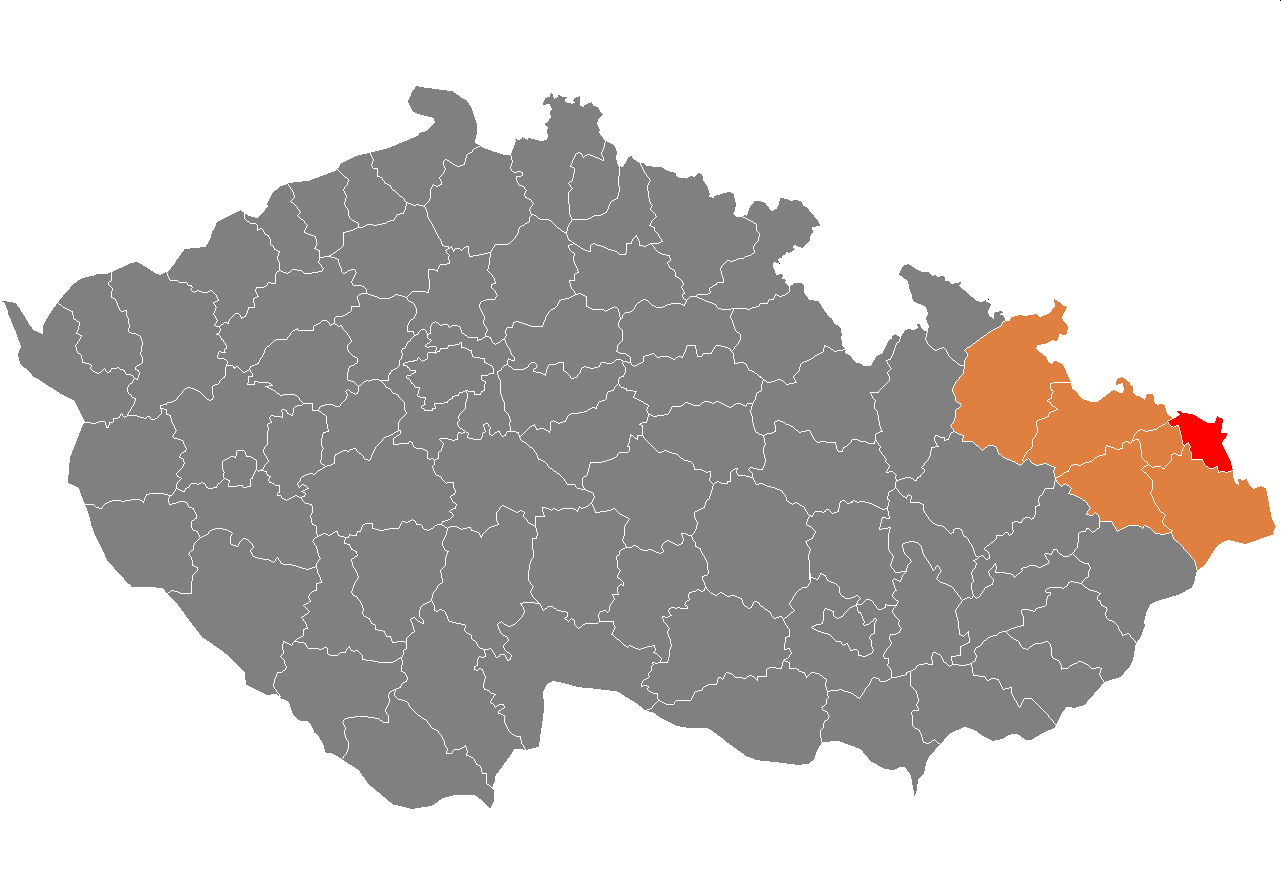
- Location in the Moravian-Silesian Region within the Czech Republic
- Coordinates: 49°50′N 18°29′E
- Country: Czech Republic
- Region: Moravian-Silesian
- Capital: Karviná

Area
  - Total: 356.22 km^{2} (137.54 sq mi)

Population (2026)
  - Total: 237,040
  - Density: 665.43/km^{2} (1,723.5/sq mi)
- Time zone: UTC+1 (CET)
  - Summer (DST): UTC+2 (CEST)
- Municipalities: 17
- * Cities and towns: 7
- * Market towns: 0

Karviná District (Czech: okres Karviná) is a district in the Moravian-Silesian Region of the Czech Republic. Its capital is the city of Karviná, but the most populous city is Havířov.

== Administrative division ==
Karviná District is divided into five administrative districts of municipalities with extended competence: Karviná, Bohumín, Český Těšín, Havířov and Orlová.

=== List of municipalities ===
Cities and towns are marked in bold:

Albrechtice – Bohumín – Český Těšín – Chotěbuz – Dětmarovice – Dolní Lutyně – Doubrava – Havířov – Horní Bludovice – Horní Suchá – Karviná – Orlová – Petrovice u Karviné – Petřvald – Rychvald – Stonava – Těrlicko

== Geography ==
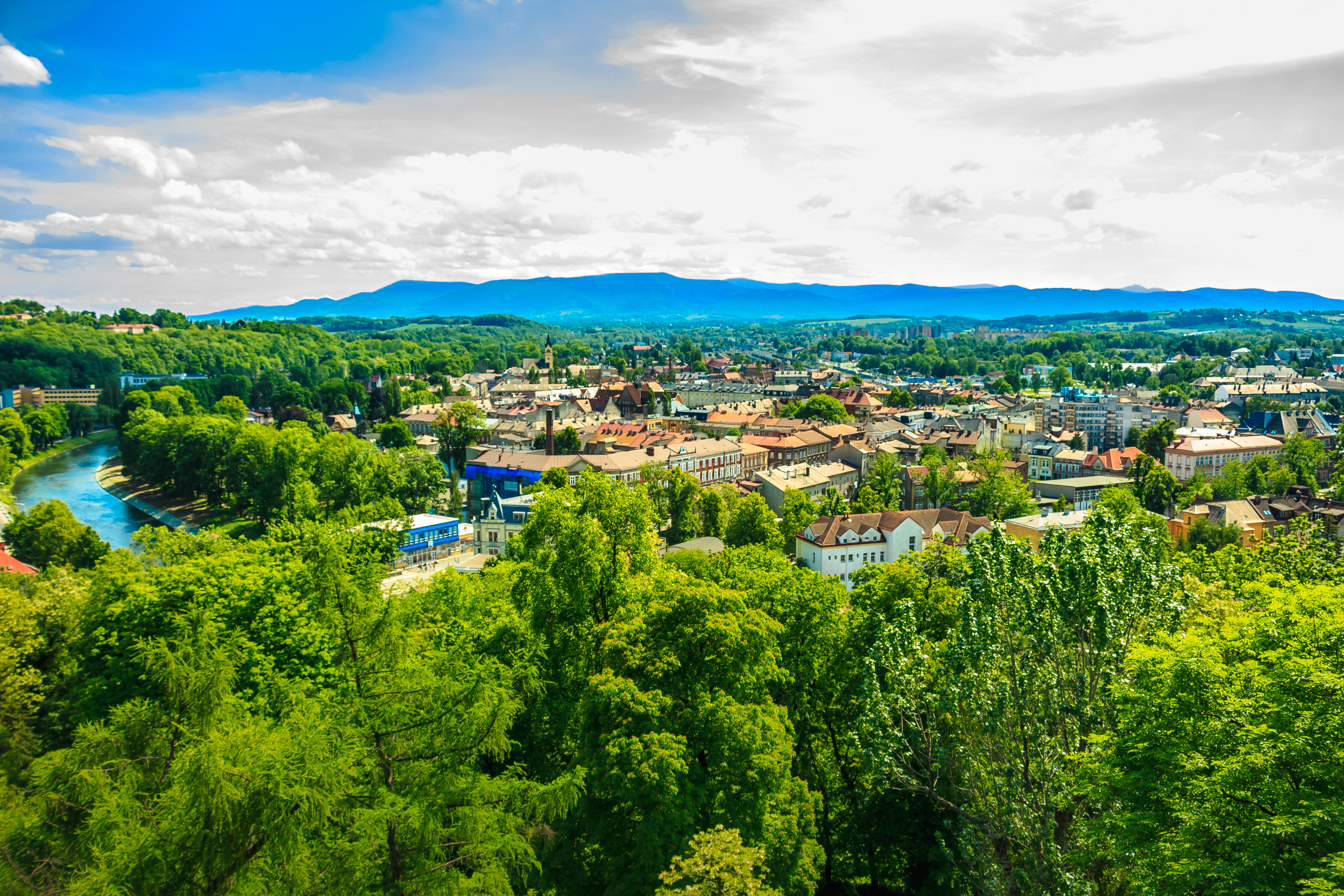
Landscape around Český Těšín

Karviná District borders Poland in the east and north. Part of the historic Trans-Olza region lies within the district. The terrain is flat and slightly undulating, without significant hills. The territory extends into two geomorphological mesoregions: Ostrava Basin (north and centre) and Moravian-Silesian Foothills (south). The highest point of the district is the hill Šachta in Český Těšín with an elevation of 427 m (1,401 ft). The lowest point of the district is the riverbed of the Oder in Bohumín at 191 m (627 ft).

From the total district area of 356.2 km^{2} (137.5 sq mi), agricultural land occupies 177.4 km^{2} (68.5 sq mi), forests occupy 52.0 km^{2} (20.1 sq mi), and water area occupies 22.6 km^{2} (8.7 sq mi). Forests cover 14.6% of the district's area.

The territory is rich in both rivers and bodies of water. The most important river of the district is the Olza, which partly forms the Czech–Polish border and partly crosses the territory. It flows to the Oder River, which flows along the northwestern district border. Other notable rivers are the Stonávka, Petrůvka and Lučina. The largest body of water is the Těrlicko Reservoir.

There are no large-scale protected areas.

== Demographics ==
Historical population

Year	Pop.	±%
1869	49,326	—
1880	61,358	+24.4%
1890	73,253	+19.4%
1900	106,842	+45.9%
1910	138,605	+29.7%

Year	Pop.	±%
1921	156,492	+12.9%
1930	171,090	+9.3%
1950	160,847	−6.0%
1961	213,699	+32.9%
1970	274,220	+28.3%

Year	Pop.	±%
1980	286,289	+4.4%
1991	285,998	−0.1%
2001	281,000	−1.7%
2011	256,394	−8.8%
2021	235,579	−8.1%

Source: Censuses

=== Most populous municipalities ===
Name	Population	Area (km^{2})
Havířov	67,998	32
Karviná	48,684	58
Orlová	27,383	25
Český Těšín	22,870	34
Bohumín	20,234	31
Rychvald	7,823	17
Petřvald	7,350	13
Dolní Lutyně	5,350	25
Petrovice u Karviné	4,973	20
Těrlicko	4,876	25

== Economy ==
The largest employers with headquarters in Karviná District and at least 1,000 employees are:

Economic entity	Location	Number of employees	Main activity
Havířov Hospital	Havířov	1,500–1,999	Health care
Karviná-Ráj Hospital	Karviná	1,500–1,999	Health care
Bonatrans Group	Bohumín	1,000–1,499	Manufacture of rolling stock parts
Slezská diakonie	Český Těšín	1,000–1,499	Field social work activities
Transdev Slezsko	Havířov	1,000–1,499	Urban and suburban passenger land transport

== Transport ==
The D1 motorway from Brno to the Czech-Polish border crosses the northern part of the district. The southern part is crossed with the D48 motorway (part of the European routes E75 and E462), which connects Frýdek-Místek with Czech-Polish border near Cieszyn.

== Sights ==
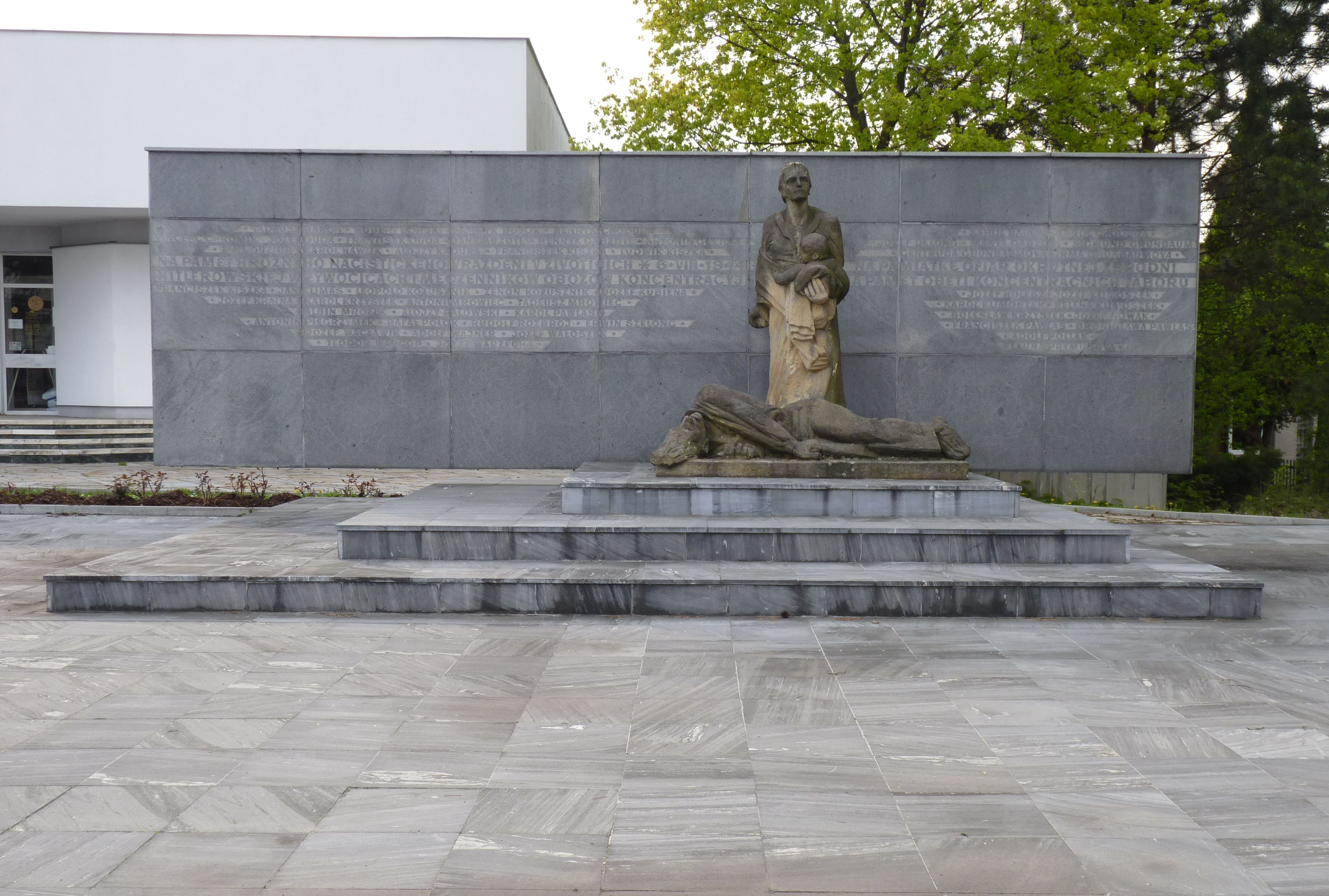
Memorial to the victims of Nazi terror

The most important monument in the district and the only one protected as a national cultural monument is the memorial to the victims of Nazi terror in Havířov.

The best-preserved settlements, protected as monument zones, are:

- Český Těšín
- Karviná

The most visited tourist destinations are the DinoPark Ostrava amusement park in Doubrava, Muzeum Těšínska and Chotěbuz-Podobora Archeopark.
