= Dan Gawrecki =

Czech historian (1943–2025)

Dan Gawrecki (23 December 1943 – 3 March 2025) was a Czech historian who focused mostly on Silesian history and worked as a professor from 2006.

== Life and career ==
After graduating from the secondary school in Ostrava-Poruba (1957–1960), he studied at the Faculty of Arts of the University of Olomouc (history-Russian). In 1969, he received his PhD (for his thesis Bund der Deutschen und Sudetendeutsche Partei) and in 1977 he defended his thesis German Defence Associations in the Habsburg Monarchy and Czechoslovakia from 1880 to 1938 and received the degree of CSc. He was employed at the Silesian Institute of the Academy of Sciences of the Czech Republic (1968–1993), where he was director from 1987 to 1991. From 1993, he worked at the Institute of History and Museology of the Faculty of Arts of the University of Opava, where he was the head of the Institute from 1994. In 1997, he received his habilitation at the Faculty of Philosophy of Comenius University in Bratislava with the thesis Political and national conditions in Těšín Silesia from 1918 to 1938. In 2006, he was appointed professor in Warsaw. Gawrecki died on 3 March 2025, at the age of 81.

== Books ==
- Politické a národnostní poměry v Těšínském Slezsku 1918–1938. Český Těšín 1999
- Dějiny Českého Slezska I–II. Opava 2003 (co-author)
- Historia Górnego Śląska. Gliwice 2011 (co-author)
- Jazyk a národnost ve sčítáních lidu na Těšínsku v letech 1880–1930. Český Těšín: Muzeum Těšínska, 2017.

== Articles ==
- Der Schlesische Landtag. In: Die Habsburgermonarchie 1848–1918. Band VII. Verfassung und Parliamentarismus. Vienna 2000, pp. 2105–2130.
- Mečislav Borák – historik Těšínska. Těšínsko, 43, 2005, Vol. 1, pp. 29–32.
- Polské politické strany. In: Politické strany 1861–1865. Vývoj politických stran a hnutí v českých zemích a Československu. Brno 2005, pp. 495–510.
- Politické strany polské menšiny. In: Politické strany 1861–1865. Vývoj politických stran a hnutí v českých zemích a Československu. Brno 2005, pp. 943–956.
- Józef Chlebowczyk a česká historiografie. In: Józef Chlebowczyk – badacz procesów narodotwórczych XIX i XX wieku. Katowice 2007, pp. 75–91.
- Těšínsko o letech 1783–1938. Těšínsko 2007, Vol. 4, pp. 11–17.
- Tschechische Historiker und ihr Anteil an den Vorbereitungsarbeiten am Buch Geschichte Oberschlesiens. Germanoslavica, Zeitschrift für germano-slawische Studien, 18, 2007, Vol. 1-2, pp. 181–187.
- Granice i zmiany przynależności Śląska Cieszyńskiego. In: Śląsk Cieszyński – granice, przynależność – tożsamość. Cieszyn, Muzeum Śląska Cieszyńskiego 2008, pp. 15–24.
