= Idzi Panic =

Polish historian (born 1952)

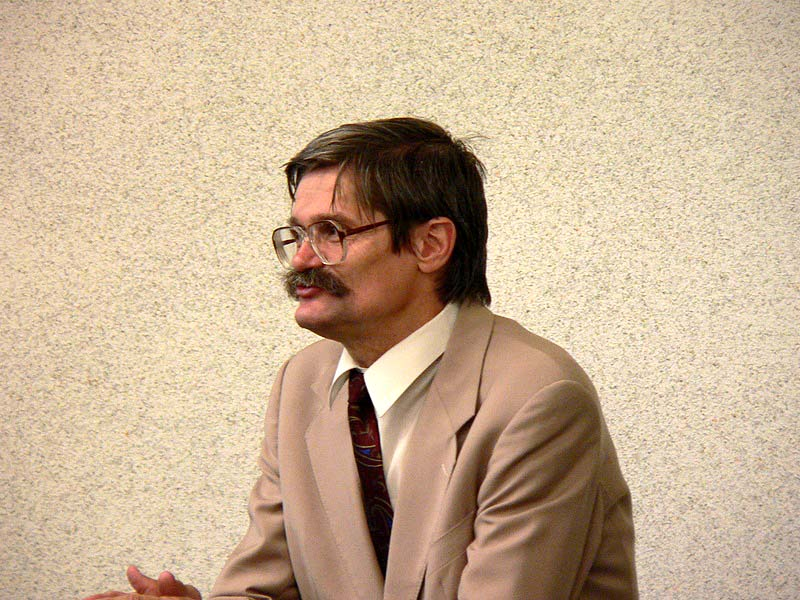
- Portrait of Panic, 2006
- Born: Idzi Jan Panic; 1952 (age 73–74); Wodzisław Śląski, Katowice Voivodeship, Poland
- Occupation: Scholar

Academic background
- Education: University of Silesia
- Thesis: (1980)

Academic work
- Discipline: History
- Sub-discipline: Medieval studies
- Main interests: History of Silesia

Idzi Jan Panic (born 1952 in Wodzisław Śląski) is a Polish historian, and professor at the University of Silesia. He specialises in the history of Cieszyn Silesia and medieval Poland.

He graduated from the University of Silesia in Katowice in 1976 and gained a Ph.D. from this there in 1980. In 1999 Panic gained the title of professor.

His articles have been published in Studia Historyczne, Śląski Kwartalnik Historyczny Sobótka, Pamiętnik Cieszyński and Těšínsko.

== Works ==
- Księstwo Cieszyńskie w średniowieczu. Studia z dziejów politycznych i społecznych (1988)
- Historia osadnictwa w księstwie opolskim we wczesnym średniowieczu (1992)
- Początki Węgier. Polityczne aspekty formowania się państwa i społeczeństwa węgierskiego w końcu IX i w pierwszej połowie X wieku (1995)
- Książę cieszyński Przemysław Noszak (* ok. 1332/1336 - + 1410) (1996) - political biography
- Ostatnie lata Wielkich Moraw (2000)
- Poczet Piastów i Piastówien cieszyńskich (2002)
- Żory w czasach Przemyślidów i Habsburgów. Z badań nad historią miasta w latach 1327-1742 (2002)
- Dzieje Górek Wielkich i Małych (2005)
- Studia z dziejów Skoczowa w czasach piastowskich (2005)
- Zachodniosłowiańska nazwa "Niemcy" w świetle źródeł średniowiecznych (2007)
- Dzieje Cieszyna od pradziejów do czasów współczesnych (2010) - editor
- Tajemnica Całunu (2010)
- Jak my ongiś godali: język mieszkańców Górnego Śląska od średniowiecza do połowy XIX wieku (2015)
- Język mieszkańców Śląska Cieszyńskiego od średniowiecza do połowy XIX wieku (2016)
- Cieszyn 1223-2023 w osiemsetlecie uzyskania praw miejskich. Uwagi na temat czasu i okoliczności lokacji miasta (2023)
