= Těšínsko (disambiguation) =

Těšínsko, also known as Cieszyn Silesia, is a historical region in south-eastern Silesia.

Těšínsko may also refer to:

- Těšínsko (magazine), a Czech magazine
- 38674 Těšínsko, asteroid
