= Gmina Brenna =

Gmina Brenna Brenna Commune
- Gmina
- Coat of arms

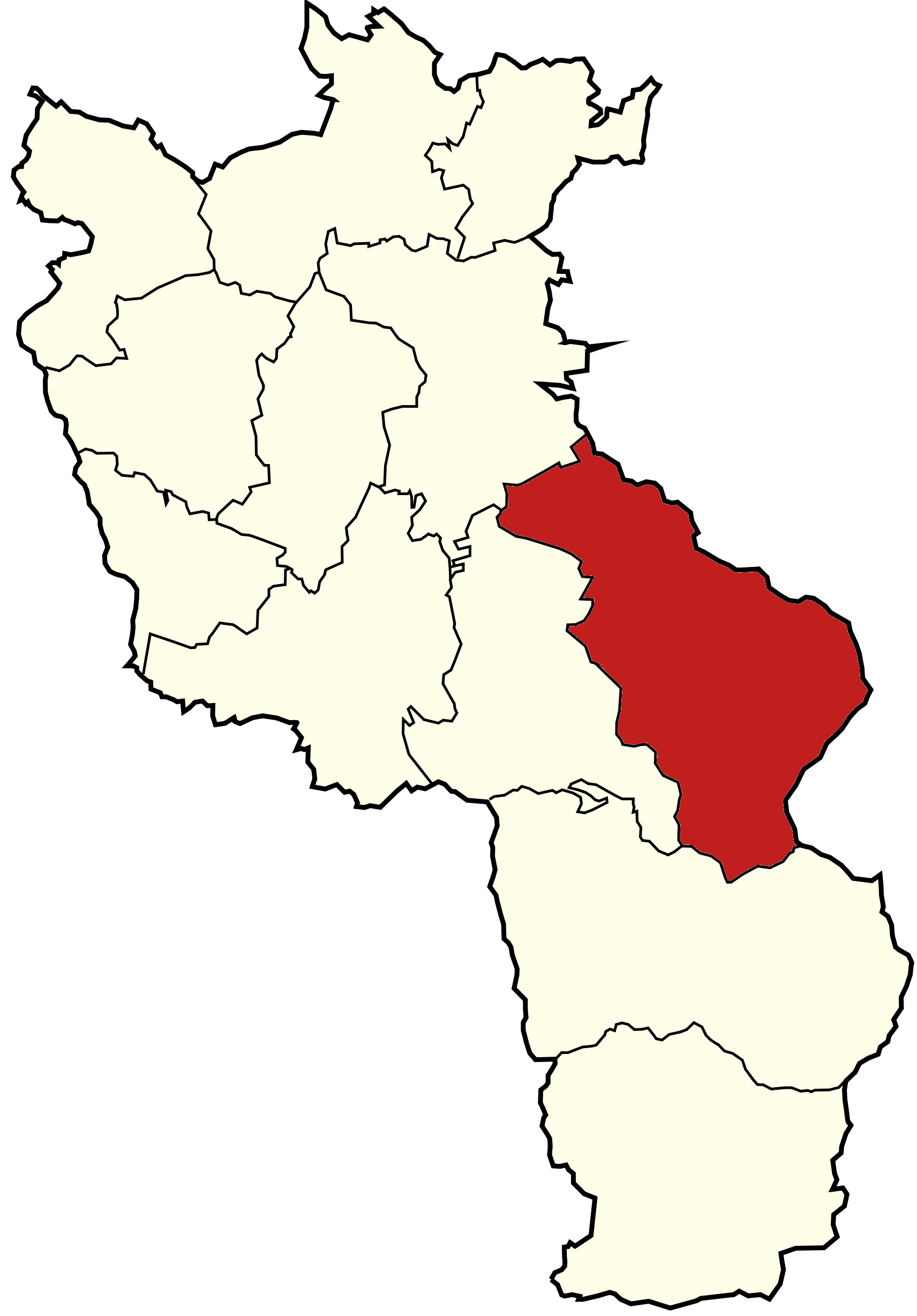
- Gmina Brenna within the Cieszyn County
- Coordinates (Brenna): 49°43′34.39″N 18°54′20.64″E
- Country: Poland
- Voivodeship: Silesian
- County: Cieszyn
- Seat: Brenna

Government
  - Mayor: Jerzy Pilch

Area
  - Total: 95.54 km^{2} (36.89 sq mi)

Population (2019-06-30)
  - Total: 11,222
  - Density: 117.5/km^{2} (304.2/sq mi)
- Website: http://www.brenna.org.pl/

Gmina Brenna is a rural gmina (administrative district) in Cieszyn County, Silesian Voivodeship, in southern Poland, in the historical region of Cieszyn Silesia. Its seat is the village of Brenna.

The gmina covers an area of 95.54 square kilometres (36.9 sq mi), and as of 2019 its total population is 11,222.

== Villages ==
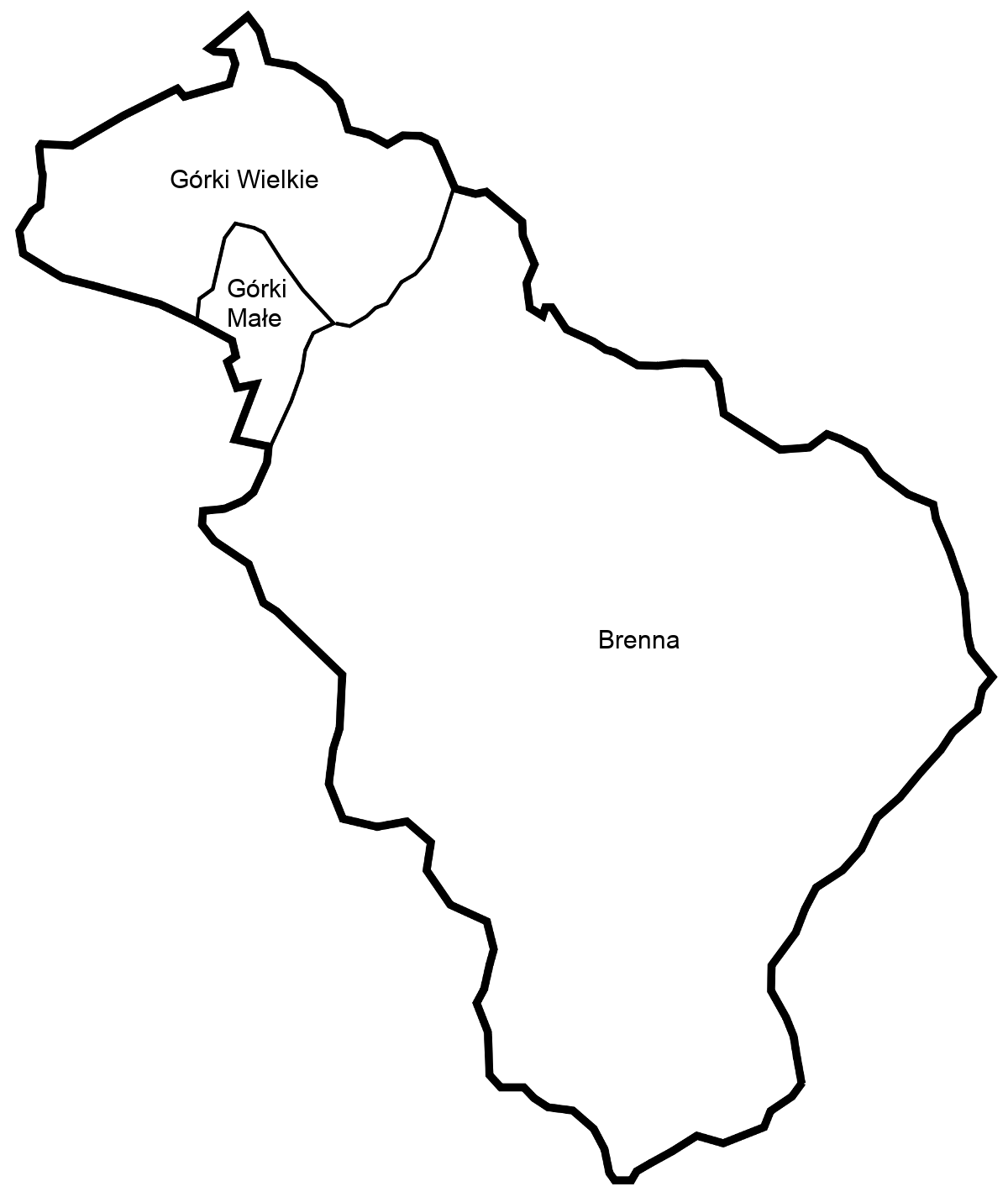
Division of the gmina

Gmina Brenna contains villages of Brenna, Górki Małe and Górki Wielkie.

== Neighbouring gminas ==
Gmina Brenna is bordered by the gminas of Skoczów, Jasienica, Jaworze, Bielsko-Biała, Szczyrk, Wisła and Ustroń.

== Twin towns – sister cities ==
Gmina Brenna is twinned with:

- Baiersdorf, Germany
- Fleurbaix, France
- Główczyce, Poland
