= Brenna, Poland =

Brenna
- Village
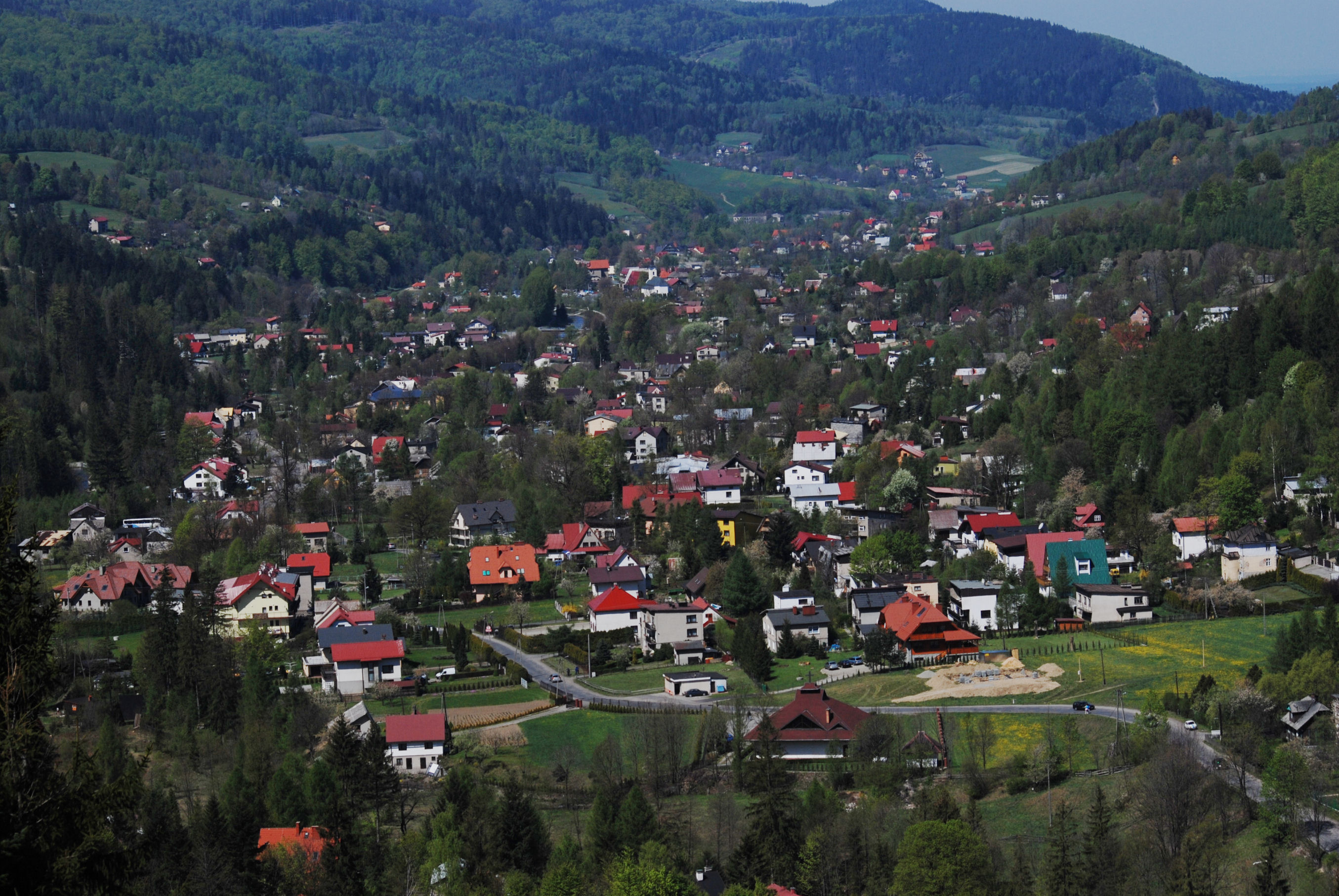
- View of Brenna

- Coat of arms

- Location within Silesian Voivodeship Location within Poland
- Coordinates: 49°43′34.39″N 18°54′20.64″E
- Country: Poland
- Voivodeship: Silesian
- County: Cieszyn
- Gmina: Brenna
- First mentioned: 1490

Area
  - Total: 78.3 km^{2} (30.2 sq mi)
- Elevation: 420 m (1,380 ft)

Population (2016)
  - Total: 6,134
  - Density: 78.3/km^{2} (203/sq mi)
- Time zone: UTC+1 (CET)
  - Summer (DST): UTC+2 (CEST)
- Postal code: 43-438
- Car plates: SCI
- Website: http://www.brenna.org.pl

Brenna is a village in and the seat of Gmina Brenna, Cieszyn County, Silesian Voivodeship, southern Poland, located in the historical region of Cieszyn Silesia. It is located in the Silesian Beskids mountain range, along the river Brennica, right tributary of the Vistula river.

== History ==
The village was first mentioned in 1490 as z Brennej (from Brenna). Politically the village belonged then to the Duchy of Teschen, a fee of the Kingdom of Bohemia, which after 1526 became part of the Habsburg monarchy.

In years 1573/1577–1594 it belonged to Skoczów-Strumień state country that was split from the Duchy of Teschen but was later purchased back. Since 1653 it belonged to Teschener Kammer.

After Revolutions of 1848 in the Austrian Empire a modern municipal division was introduced in the re-established Austrian Silesia. The village as a municipality was subscribed to the political district of Bielsko and the legal district of Skoczów. According to the censuses conducted in 1880, 1890, 1900 and 1910 the population of the municipality dropped from 2986 in 1880 to 2963 in 1910, with majority of the inhabitants being native Polish-speakers (97.7–99.4%) and a dwindling minority of German speakers (62 or 2.1% in 1880 and 18 or 0.6% in 1910) and rising Czech-speaking (7 or 0.2% in 1880 and 24 or 0.8% in 1910), most of the citizens were Roman Catholics (2520, 85.1% in 1910), followed by Protestants (419, 14.1%) and Jews (24, 0.8%). The village was also traditionally inhabited by Silesian Gorals, speaking Cieszyn Silesian dialect.

After World War I, fall of Austria-Hungary, Polish–Czechoslovak War and the division of Cieszyn Silesia in 1920, it became a part of Poland. It was then annexed by Nazi Germany at the beginning of World War II. After the war it was restored to Poland.

== Landmarks ==
- Saint John Church built in the 18th century, with a rectory from 1789.

== People ==
Karol Holeksa, Polish politician, was born here.

== Twin towns and sister cities ==
- Siófok, Hungary
