= Muzeum Těšínska =

Museum in Český Těšín, Czech Republic

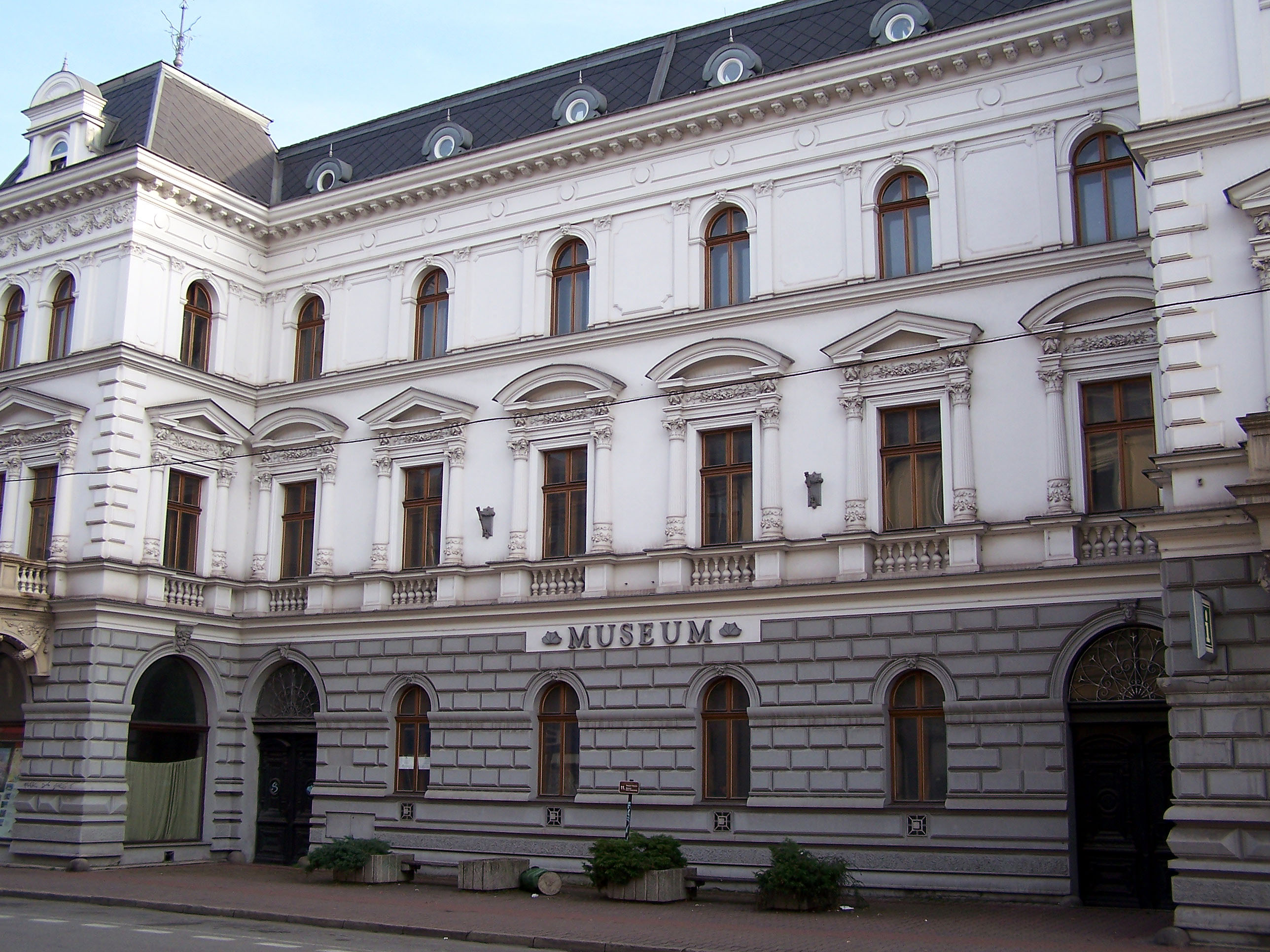
- Main building of the Muzeum Těšínska
- Established: 1948
- Location: Český Těšín, Czech Republic
- Coordinates: 49.747222°N 18.624111°E
- Type: Regional
- Director: Zbyšek Ondřeka
- Website: http://www.muzeumct.cz/

Muzeum Těšínska (Polish: Muzeum Ziemi Cieszyńskiej, English: Museum of Cieszyn Silesia) is a regional museum in Český Těšín, Czech Republic. It focuses on the history and traditions of the region of Cieszyn Silesia. The museum was founded in 1948 by teacher Ladislav Báča.

It has 12 regional branches and show rooms. Thanks to its regional branch in Jablunkov it is the easternmost professional museum in the Czech Republic. The museum cooperates with Muzeum Śląska Cieszyńskiego and Książnica Cieszyńska in the neighbouring Cieszyn in Poland.

Since 1957 the museum publishes the Těšínsko magazine. Current director is Zbyšek Ondřeka.
