= Museum of Cieszyn Silesia =

Museum in Cieszyn, Poland

Muzeum Śląska Cieszyńskiego
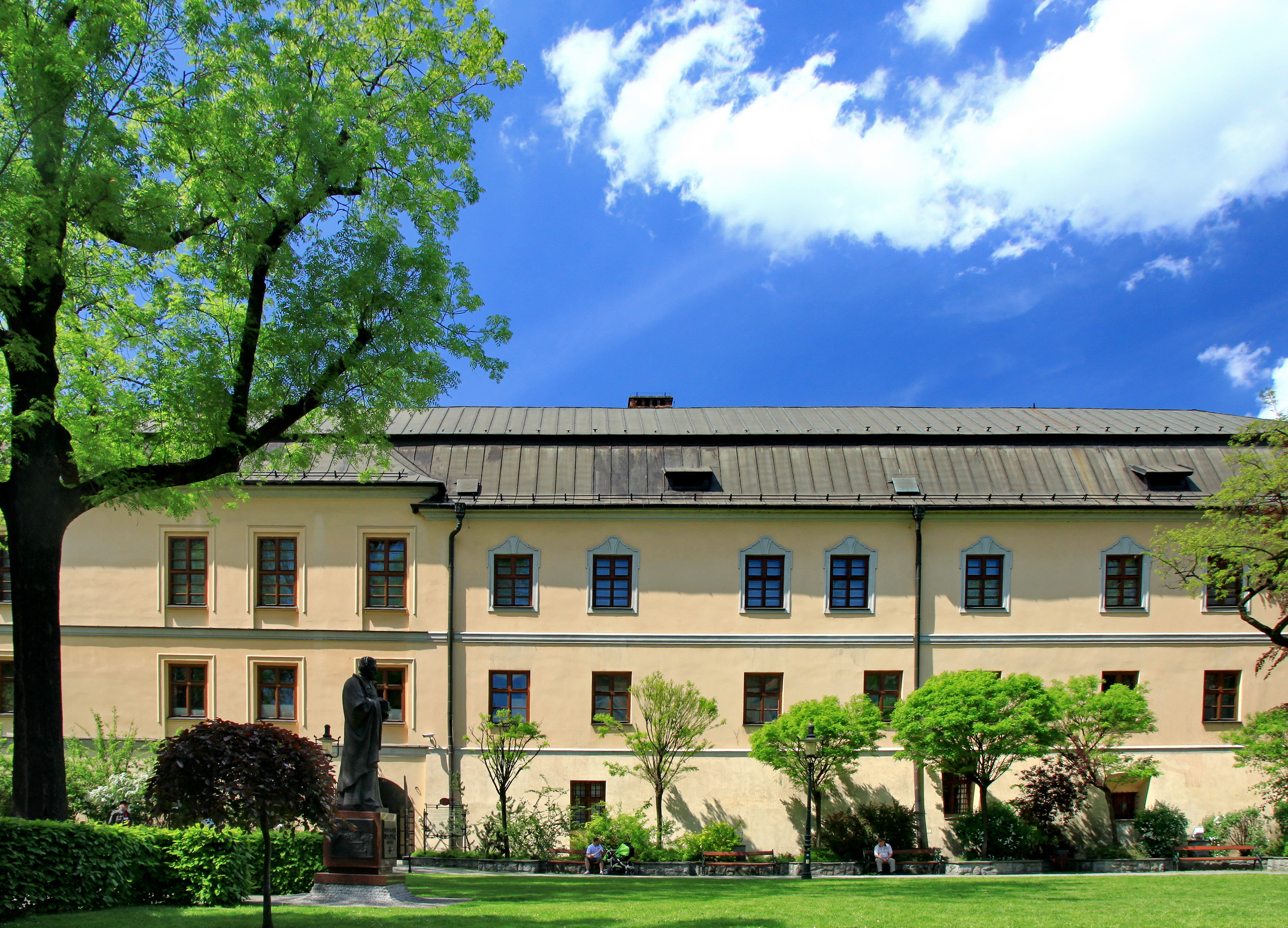
- Muzeum Śląska Cieszyńskiego
- Established: 1802
- Location: Cieszyn, Poland
- Coordinates: 49.7479°N 18.6339°E
- Type: Regional
- Director: Marian Dembiniok
- Website: http://www.muzeumcieszyn.pl/

The Museum of Cieszyn Silesia (Polish: Muzeum Śląska Cieszyńskiego) in Cieszyn is one of the oldest public museums in Central Europe and the oldest public museum in Poland, set up by father Leopold Jan Szersznik in 1802.

== History ==
The town palace of the Counts of Larisch was built after the great fire of Cieszyn in 1789. Jan Józef Antoni count Larisch von Mönnich - founder of the residence, decided to build for himself a seat that would reflect his social status and property. In 1796 count Jan Larisch bought a small bourgeois house neighbouring with a gentry house at the then Konwiktowa Street - currently Tadeusza Regera Street) that was owned by the Larisch family since the 18th century. Combining the two properties allowed him to start the planned project and build the elegant residence of counts Larisch in 1790-1796.

In 1805 the emperor Francis I invited to Cieszyn his two allies – tsar Alexander I, the grand duke Constantine, marshal Kutuzov and duke Biron of Courland. This was the time when in the Palace of the Larisch family, especially in the so-called Egyptian Hall, concerts and balls were organised for the guests of emeperor Francis. In 1809 the palace became the seat of Albert Duke of Saxony and Teschen, and then the archduke Karl Ludwig Habsburg. In 1817 the palace hosted the emperor Francis I and his wife Caroline Augusta and their retinue. In 1831 the palace was sold to duke Philip Ludwig Saint Genois d’Anneaucourt, who in 1839 sponsored the construction of the third wing of the palace designed by a Vienesse architect Joseph Kornhäusel. In this wing a circular stable was designed (currently a café) over which a ballroom called a Roman Hall was located.

In 1840 the palace was purchased by a barrister dr Antoni Demel (from this moment the palace was called Demel's tenement house), later on it was assigned to subsequent mayors of Cieszyn - Johann Demel von Elswehr (Antoni's son) and Leonard Demel von Elswehr (Antoni’ grandson). The Demel's tenement house was sold to the town in 1918 and on 21 June 1931 became the seat of the City Museum. The new institution was created from the collection of the public museum of father Leopold Jan Szersznik (founded in 1802), ethnographic Silesian Museum (founded in 1903 by the Polish Ethnographical Association in Cieszyn), the municipal Town Museum and private collections.

In 1942 a fire broke out in the Roman Hall that destroyed the entire roof and damaged rooms on the second floor. On 24 January 1966 the museum was closed pursuant to a post-inspection requisition of the Work Inspector of the Culture and Art Officers Trade Union. After an overhaul the museum reopened on 1 May 1969. Due to poor technical condition of the building, museum exhibitions were closed in 1983 and a general overhaul was initiated that included adjustments to modern needs of the museum. The overhaul was finished in 2002. In 2004, the museum received the Wojciech Korfanty Award from the Upper Silesian Union.

== Architecture ==
The building bears traces of Baroque-neoclassical style. The two storey and three wing building is made of brick and broken stone in cellars. It is plastered. The cellars of the palace are partially bricked up and vaulted in line with a barrel style. The interior design is based on two tracts. On the ground floor there are two arterial hallways: the first one with a cross-barrel vaulting and a barrel one with a lunette, the second one with a barrel vaulting with lunettes. Most of the rooms in plinth have barrel and sail vaulting.

In the south wing there is a former stable (currently a café) based on a circular plan, two storeys high, crowned by a domed vault with lunettes, based on a Tuscan stone column.

The rooms on the first floor located in the front tract of the north wing have cross-barrel and barrel vault with lunettes, with four fields of sail vault with corners. A room in the east wing has a barrel vault. A room on the second floor of the north and south wing have hollow vault (the Egyptian Hall), the remaining rooms have ceilings.

Stairways on the second floor are equipped with forged railings from the eighteenth century.

The front façade has seven axes. The ground floor part is bossaged and is separated from the first floor by a profiled moulding. The first and the second floor are separated by vertical pairs of slender panels. On the axis of the building there is a stone portal with cones, which is crowned by a triangle pediment with a semi-circular arch. A two wing stave gate leading to the courtyard comes from the end of the 18th century. Rectangular windows have profiled frames. The windows on the second floor of the middle part are extended and topped with a basket arch. Between the columns of the windows there are fluted panels with the themes of tears and rosettes.

The side façade (as seen from the Park of Peace) has twelve axes. The ground floor part is buttressed, based on the remains of defence walls and separated from the first floor by a mould. The windows of the second floor are decorated by long-eared envelope-shaped frames. The palace is covered by a saddle, mansard and shingled roof with dormer-windows.

The rooms on the second floor are of a representative character. Some of them (eight front ones and a corridor of the second floor) are decorated with neo-classical polychrome. The notable rooms are: The Chinese Study, decorated with oriental themes (dragons, a paradise bird) and the Egyptian Hall being a ballroom. The painting decoration of the latter hall is composed of six landscapes with themes of ancient Egyptian architecture and genre scenes located on the Egyptian columns. The landscapes include the interwoven and repeated theme of the Piast Tower and the Rotunda of St. Nicholas in Cieszyn. One of landscapes has polychrome dating back to 1796 placed there by its creator - "an academic painter" Joseph Mayer. A suite of apartments located on the second floor of the Palace has been enhanced by a set of neoclassical and eclectic furnaces located in semicircular niches.

A small French garden with an octagonal pavilion (currently the Park of Peace) was attached to the palace.

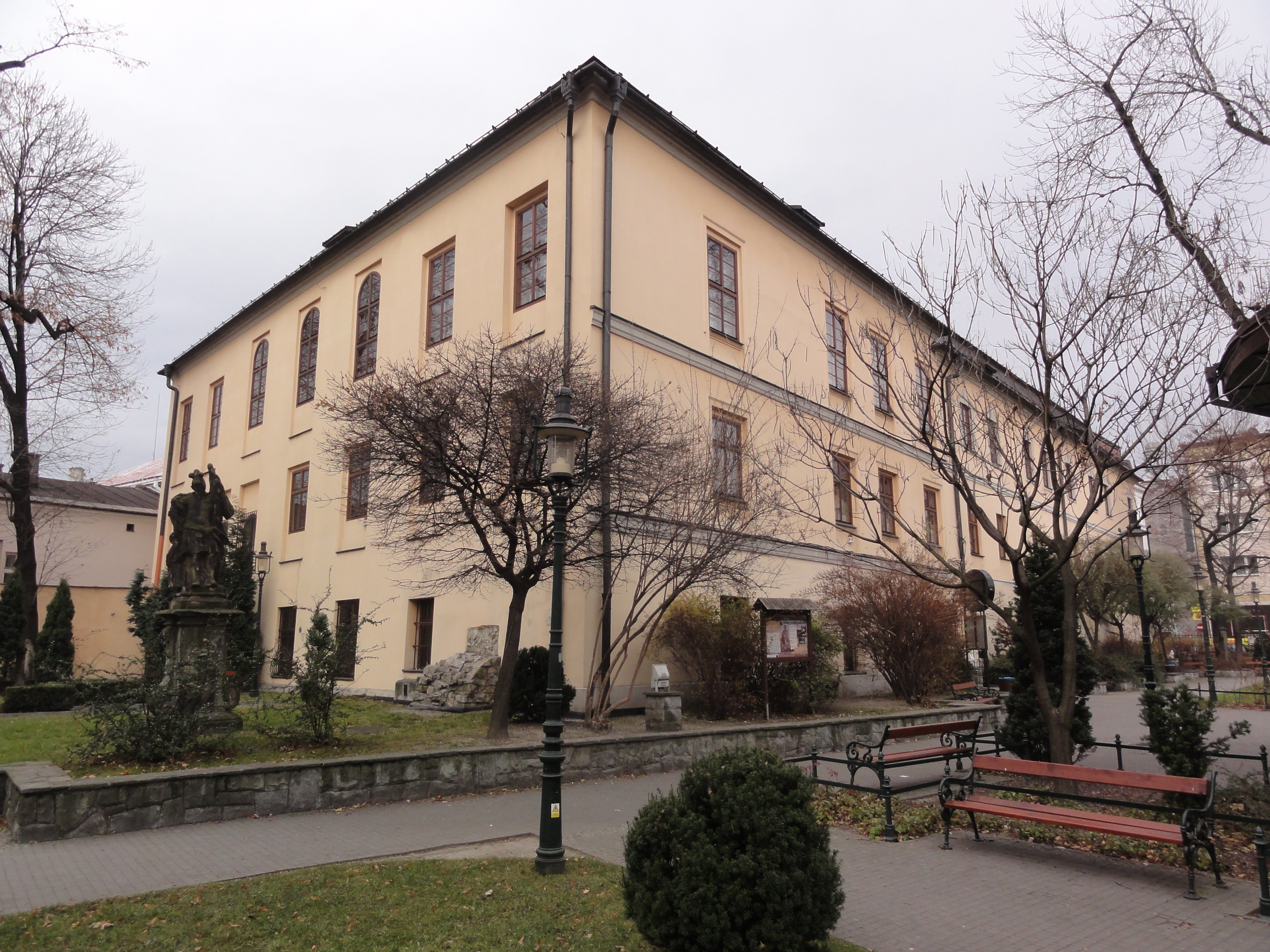
Museum - view from Park of Peace

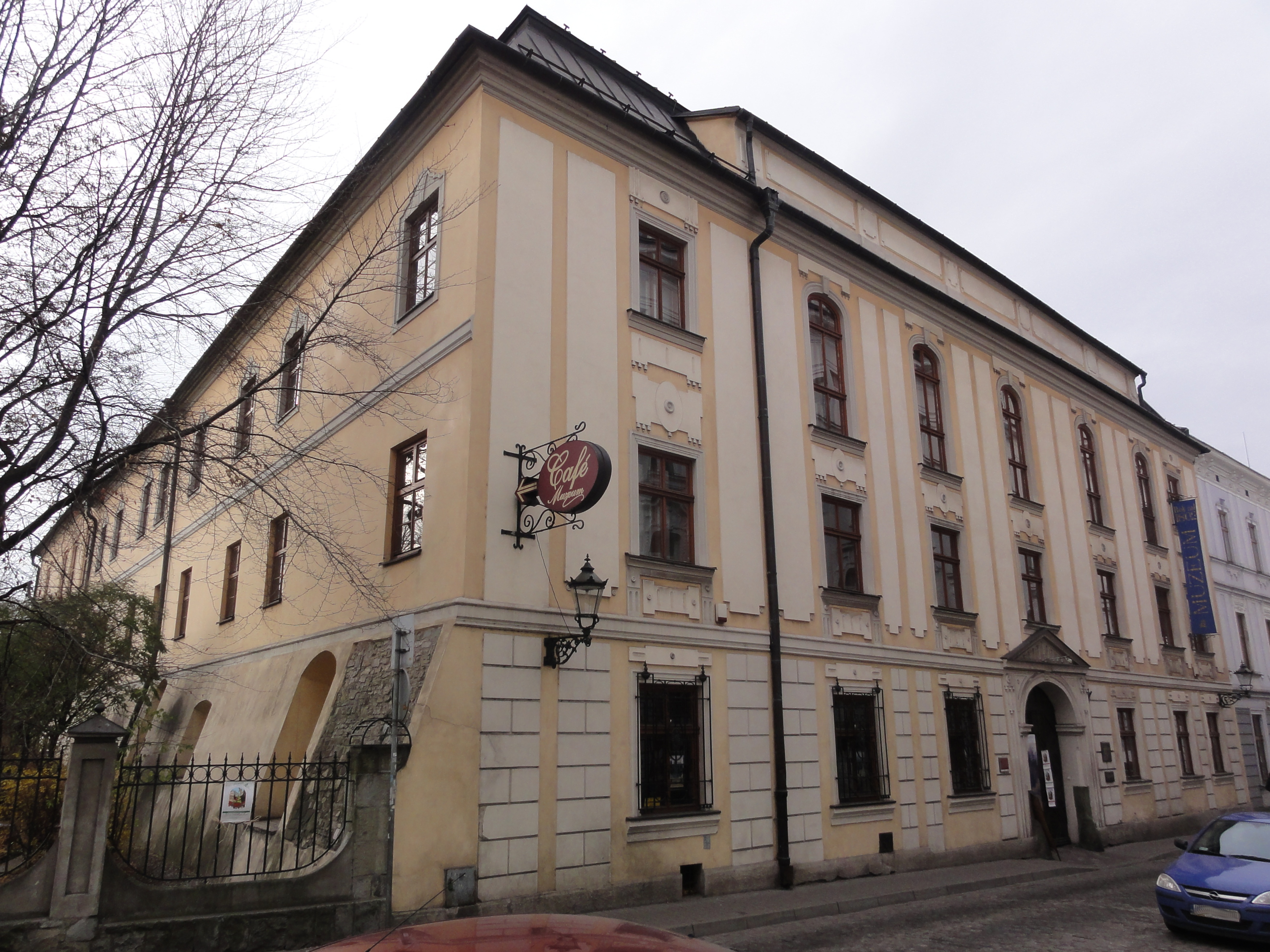
Museum - view from Tadeusz Reger Street

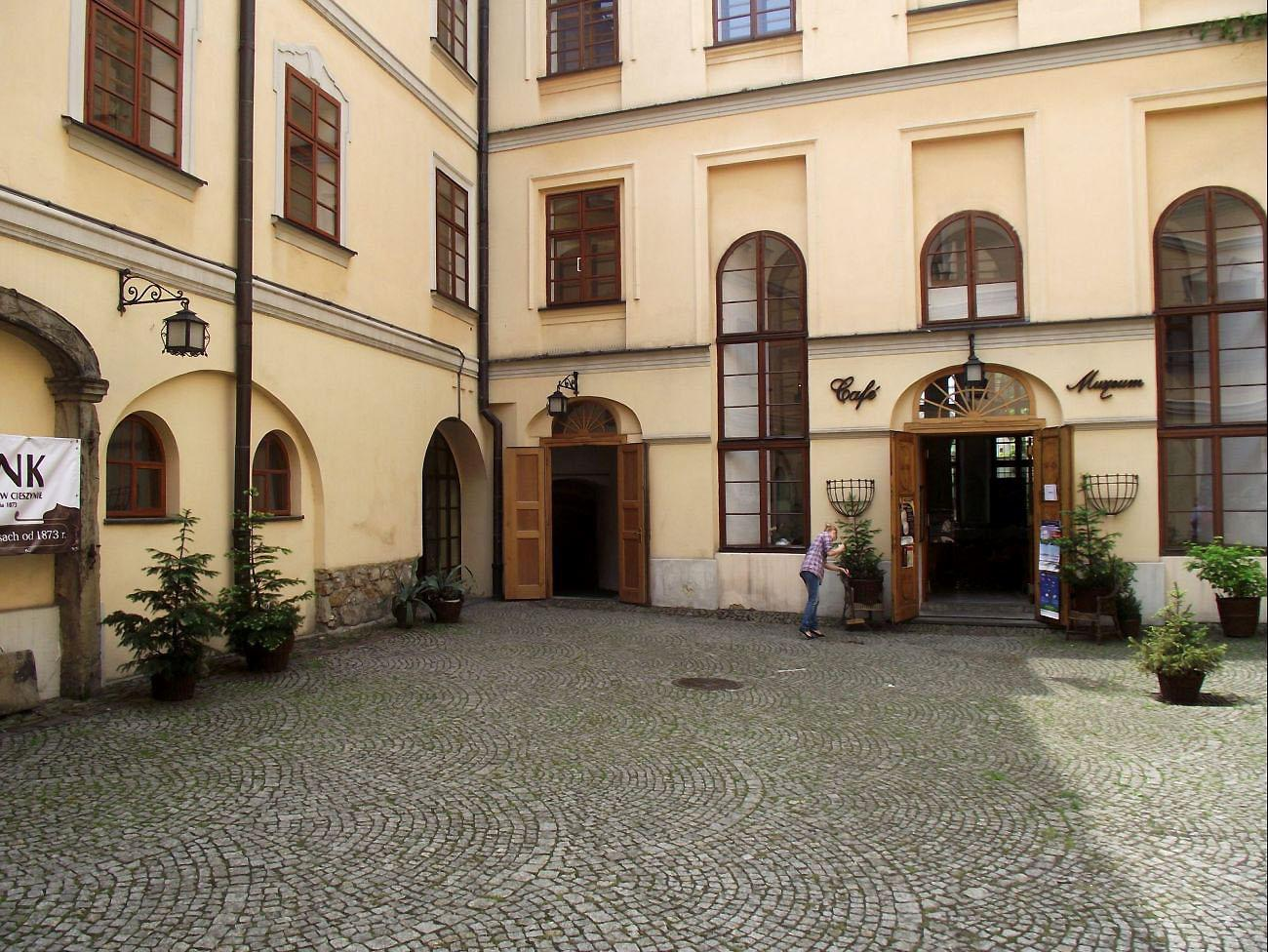
Courtyard of the Museum

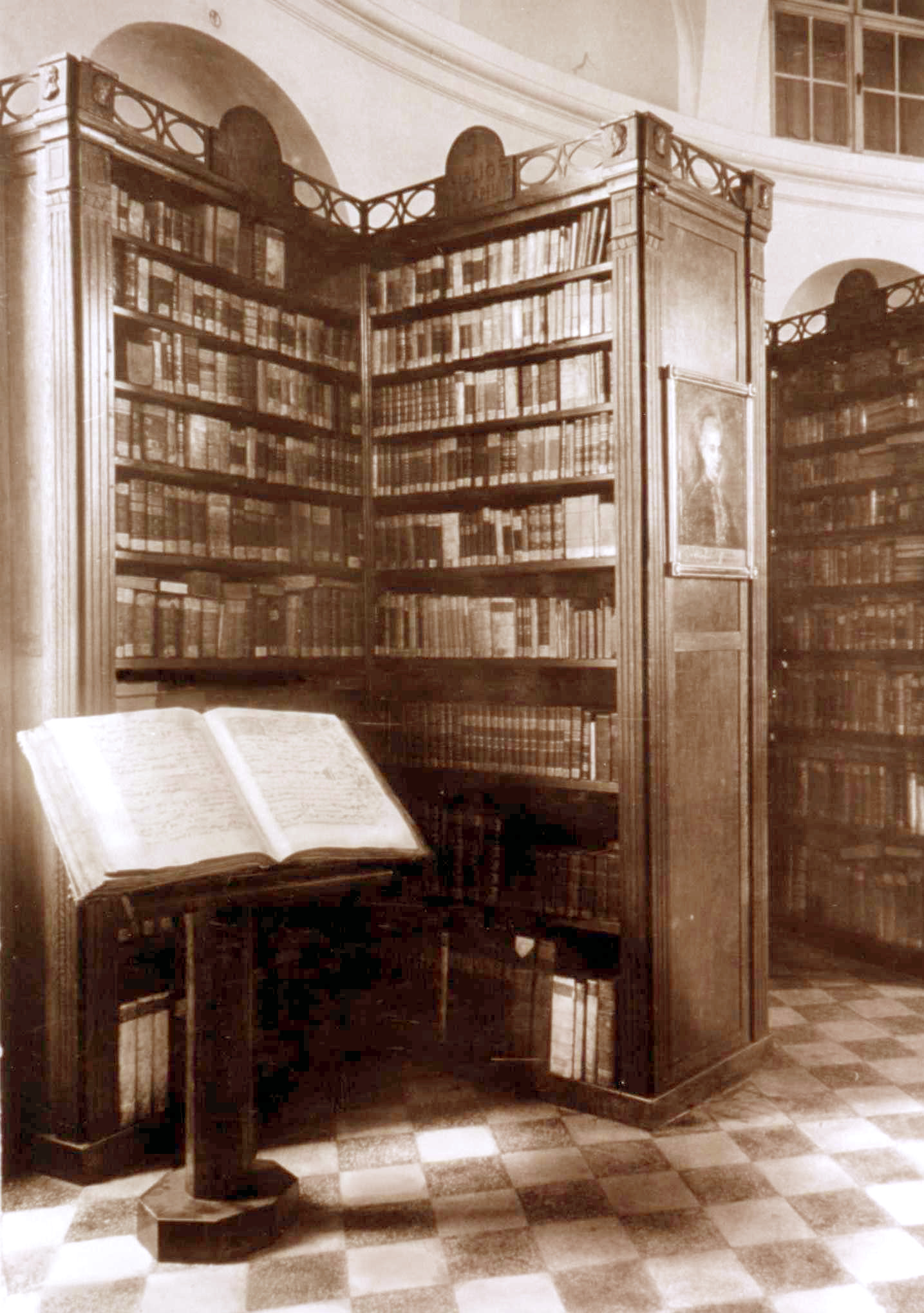
Father Szersznik Library (1935)

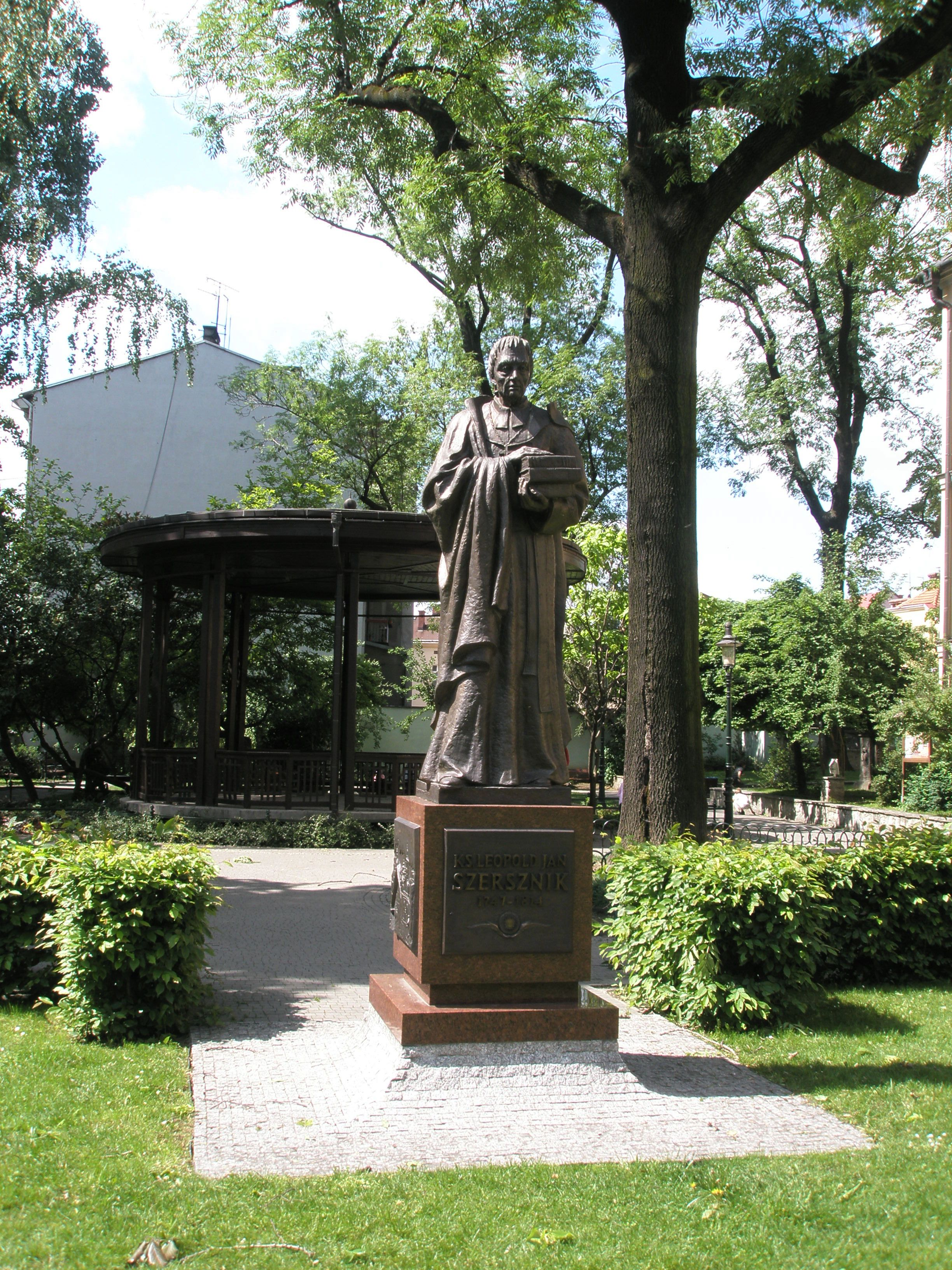
Leopold Jan Szersznik statue in Park of Peace

== Sections of the museum ==
The museum has the following sections:

- archaeology (and medieval monuments discovered in the centre of the town) - based on the collection of Leopold Szersznik, the so-called antiquity collection (archaeological sites); Roman coins and clay vessels of the Lusatian Culture (1800-1750 BC) including: Ashes urns with ashes of the deceased, painted vessels of ancient Greece and Rome, the collection of father Berger (being a part of Szersznik's collection); spearheads of spears, tools and ornaments mainly from Silesia. The collection is also based on antiques gathered by the Town Museum in Cieszyn and antiques gathered by the Polish Ethnographical Association (incorporated to the collection of the museum in 1930). The Archaeological Section was founded in 1969, inspired by the Region's Enthusiasts Association that brought into being the so-called Association of Gravediggers and Other Hole-explorers. Members of this association contributed to numerous archaeological discoveries in the area of the Old Town. Other materials came from excavations at Castle Hill in Cieszyn, as well as the settlements in Międzyświeć and Old Bielsko.
- ethnography - consists of 6415 items, the majority of which are inherited from the Polish Ethnographical Association that has operated since 1901 and the Polish Association of Folk and Domestic Industry in Cieszyn that has operated since 1931. Among the exhibits there are boxes and painted drawers, pictures on glass, parish feast art, elements of folk costumes and jewellery, folk ceramics and everyday use objects.
- photography - separated in 1981 with approx. 20000 items that include photographic iconography of Cieszyn and Cieszyn Silesia, portraits of burgher citizens, artistic photography of Cieszyn, glass negatives, stereoscope pictures, postcards and photographic equipment, photographic frames and albums. The collection of the Photography Section of the Cieszyn Silesia Museum shows a broad, over sixty year long, panorama of the history of photography in Cieszyn Silesia. It illustrates the landscape, culture, human stories and the transition in this part of Europe. The set comes from the collection initiated by Oskar Weismann, the creator of the Town Museum set up in 1901. Another sets came from donations of citizens of Cieszyn and collectors and comprised daguerreotypes, ambrotypes, ferrotypes, pannotypes and contemporary pictures as a documentary of the past. An equally interesting collection is 1500 photographic portraits of almost all social and professional groups of Cieszyn taken between 1860 and 1900. Part of the collection are illustrations of the ethnographic collection of the Silesian Museum, derived from the Polish Ethnographical Society in Cieszyn. Another part of the collection is approx. 400 catalogue-museum photos that document development of the museum exhibition. In the inter-war period the Museum received a set of photograms from the Museum of School Association in Orlová that documented the Polish educational system, cultural and educational life as well as folk culture on Trans-Olza.
- history - comprises almost 14 thousand articles. It was set up at the beginning of the 20th century and in the seventies and focused on the history of Cieszyn Silesia on the basis of the collection of the founder of the museum - father Leopold Szersznik, as well as other exhibits from the last two hundred years. The collection includes, inter alia: pistons and seals of Cieszyn and other towns (starting from Medieval times), badges of various associations, medals and military distinctions, commemorative medals, posters and placards, uniforms, collections of banknotes, militaria, a collection of historic banners.
- cartography - composed of 3456 items which are maps and plans created from the second half of the 16th century until contemporary times. The section was set up on the basis of father Szersznik and the collection of the Ethnographic Society, the Town Museum and a bibliophile from Cieszyn Wincenty Zając. The oldest objects include chalcographic maps of, inter alia, sky, world, Europe, the countries of the Austrian monarchy, Silesia and Poland. Moreover, the collection includes 19th century cadastral maps of Cieszyn, hand-painted and printed maps of particular parts of Cieszyn Silesia as well as Polish, Austrian, German and Czech maps and atlases of Poland and Europe.
- scientific - education section - created in the 1980s. The section organises broadly understood educational events, which are, inter alia: co-operation with schools and educational centres in Cieszyn and outside the city, preparation and giving museum classes, organisation of lectures and discussions concerning operations of the museum and presented exhibitions.
- art - comprises 9000 items - mainly the collection of father L.J. Szersznik, the Town Museum, Brunon Konczakowski, the Polish Ethnographic Association (and exhibits obtained and purchased by the Museum) which are: paintings, sculptures, prints, drawings and artistic crafts. The collection of father Szersznik contributed books, minerals and objects related to nature, which are regarded as the most valuable ones. During the interwar period the Museum obtained sacral exhibits from churches located in Cieszyn and the surroundings: altar pictures and sculptures from Ogrodzona, Kisielów, Puńców, Ochaby, Leszna and Stonawa.
- technology - comprises over 800 exhibits, such as kitchen tools, musical instruments, typewriters, lamps, etc. One of the most interesting exhibit is an English bicycle, manufactured in cca. 1880. Most of the exhibits come from the collection of father L.J. Szersznik. Some of them had been used by the clergymen (the musical instruments and astronomical equipment - e.g. Dutch globe dated 1602).
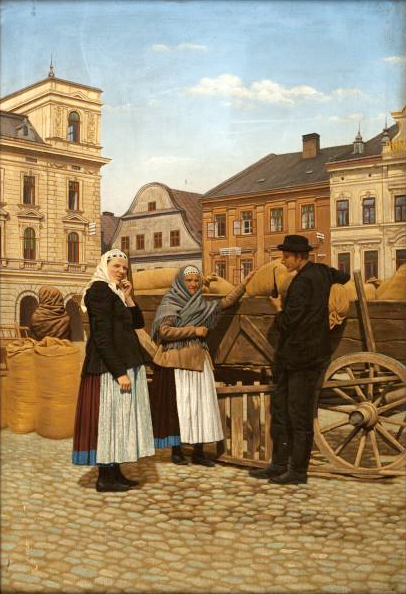
Józef Raszka, Peasants on the Main Square in Cieszyn, early 20th century

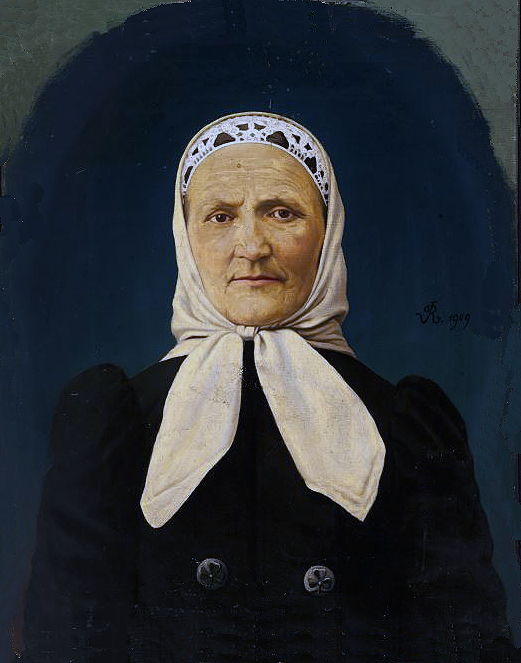
Józef Raszka, Anna Raszka in Cieszyn costume, 1909

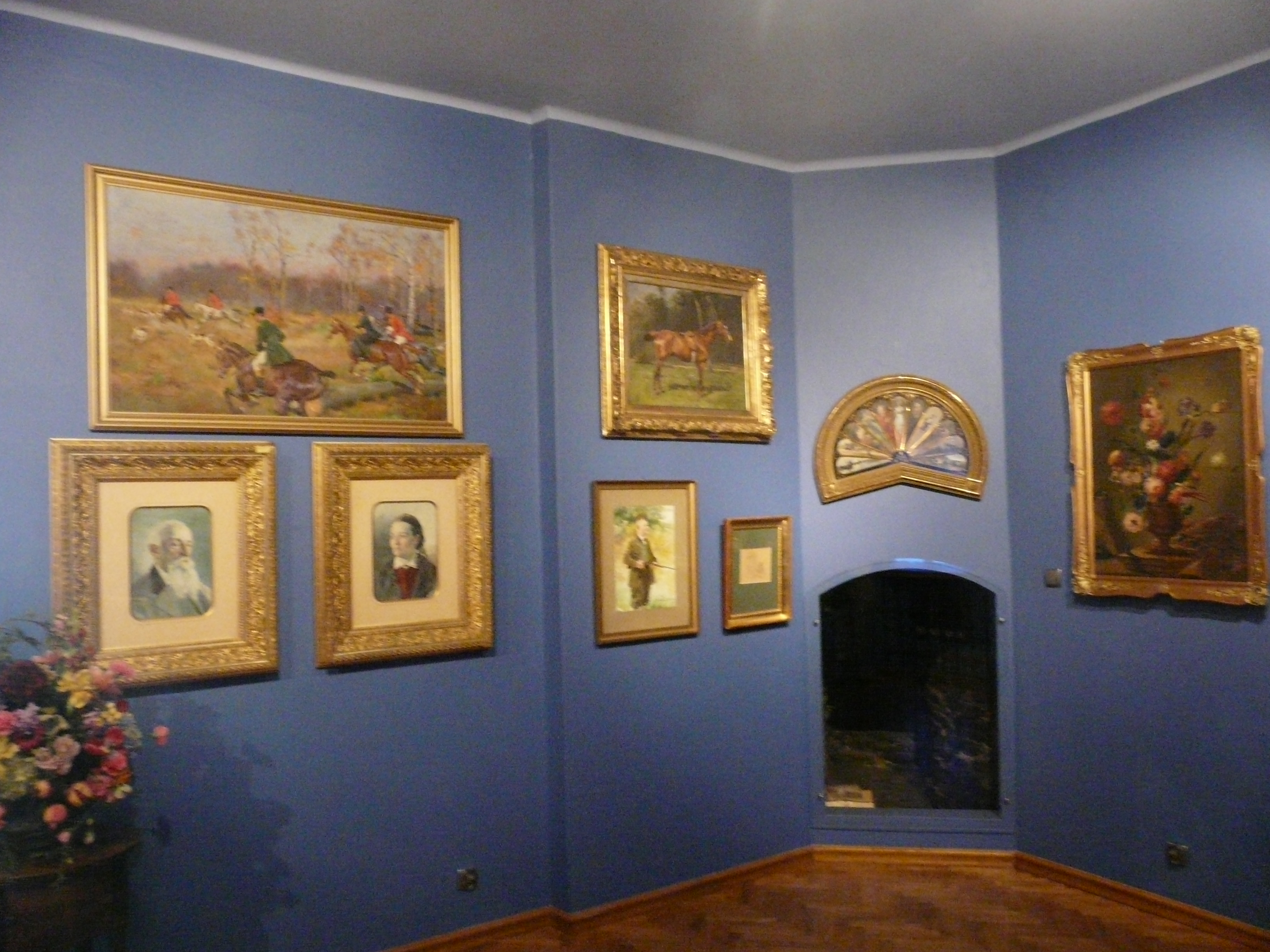
Fragment of the exhibition

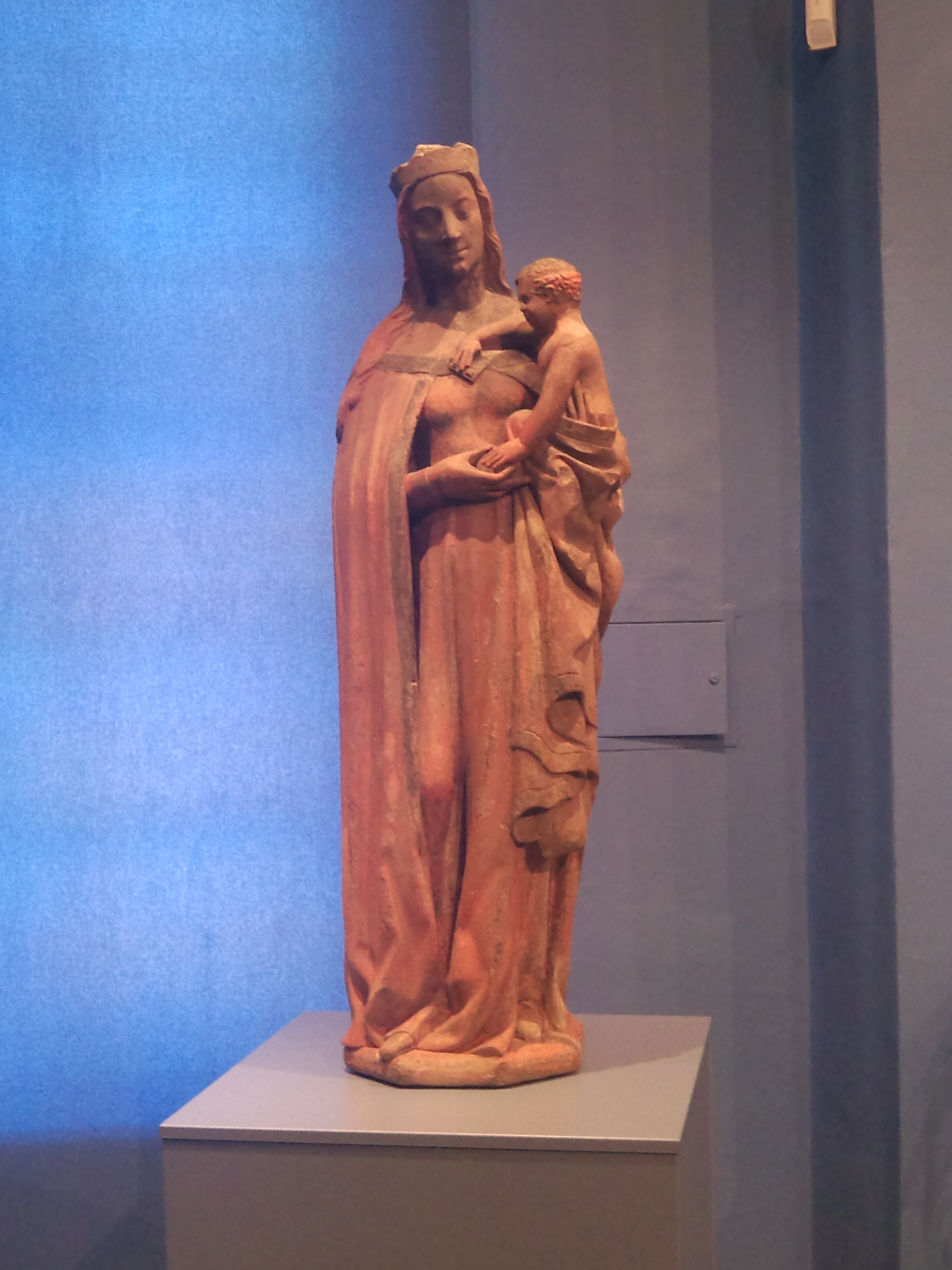
Madonna from Stary Targ, c. 1380

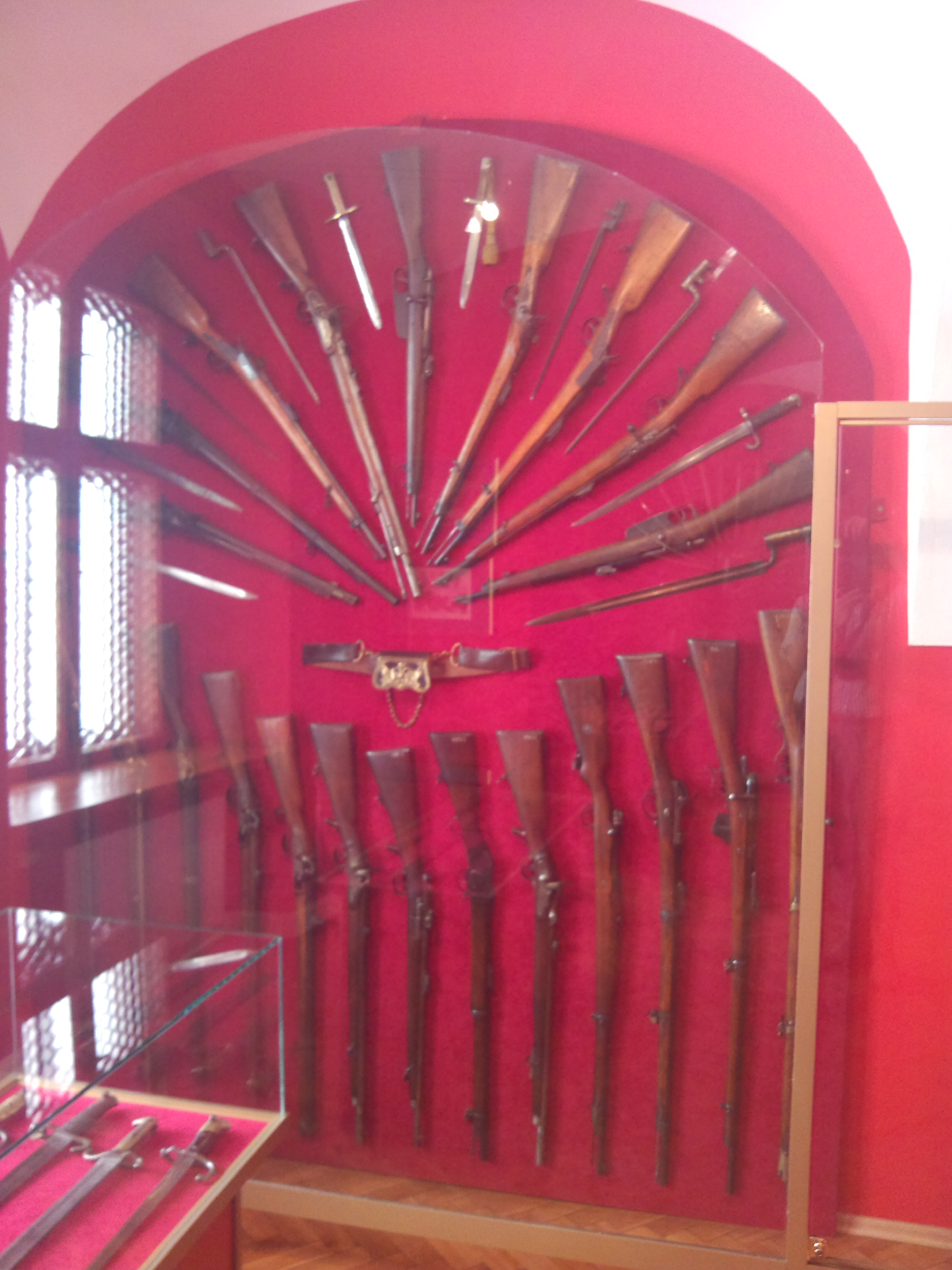
Exhibition of firearms

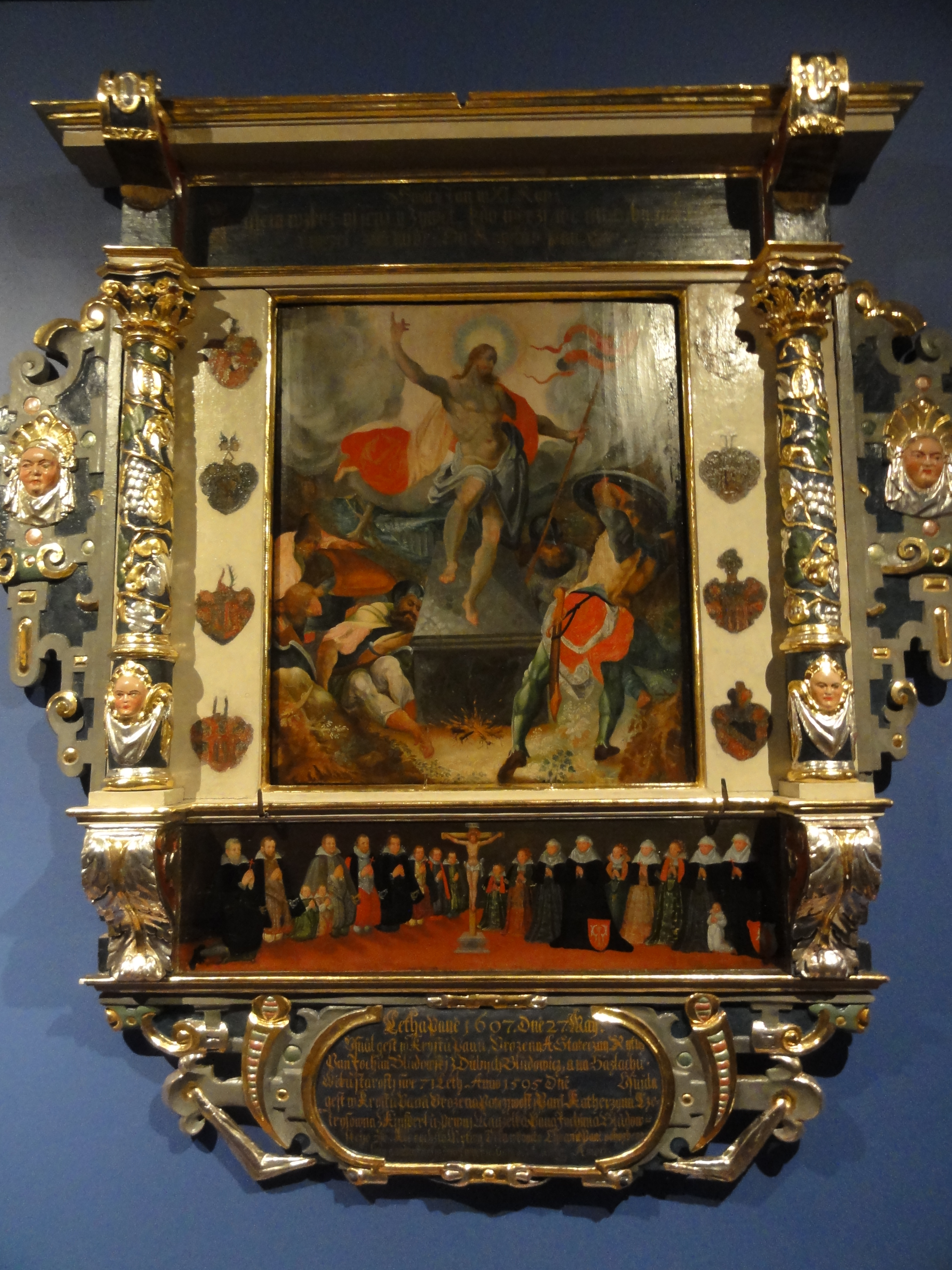
Epitaph of Bludowski family, 1620

== Permanent exhibitions ==
One of the permanent exhibitions is Art of Gothic and Renaissance composed of monuments of painting and sculpture from the 14th century to the middle of the 17th century. The collection had been a part of the décor of the local churches. These are, inter alia: altarpieces from Puńców, Ogrodzona, Kamienica, pictures from the castle of Cieszyn, a church in Leszna, the Holy Trinity Church, epitaphs of Bludowski family and Jan Żywiecki, stone and wooden sculptures. Most of the exhibits had not been exhibited due to conservation requirements. This exhibition was opened on 22 May 2016.

A permanent exhibition entitled "At the crossroads of history and cultures" located on the second floor of the Museum occupies a space of over 1000 m^{2}. It covers the period from prehistory to the end of World War II. The exposition is opened by archaeological collection depicting the oldest history of Cieszyn and Cieszyn Silesia. Another part of the collection is related to the period of the Piast dynasty and the reign of the Habsburg family. A part of the exhibition is related to the evolution of the role of the nobility and bourgeoisie over the centuries and the importance of guilds and the development of industry in the 19th century and the beginning of the 20th century. Another part of the collection fits in the chronology of the exhibition, inter alia creation of the National Council of the Duchy of Cieszyn, Polish-Czechoslovak War, the split of the town in 1920, the events of 1938 and World War II. A separate section of the exhibition is devoted to father Jan Leopold Szersznik – the founder of the Museum, and militaria located in the armoury on the first floor.

== The Scientific Library of the Museum of Cieszyn Silesia ==
The Scientific Library of the Museum of Cieszyn Silesia was set up as a museum library along with the creation of the museum in 1901. In 1960 the Museum donated a part of its collection to a newly set up branch of the Silesian Library (currently Książnica Cieszyńska). The most precious items of the collection are incunabula and old prints - part of a book collection of a famous collector from Cieszyn, Brunon Konczakowski, and the book collection of a teacher, Wincenty Zając. The museum library is meant to be of a reference character for specific departments of the Museum; archaeology, history, technology, history of art, photography. It also includes papers concerning the history of Silesia and Cieszyn Silesia. The library comprises: over 24,000 books, 370 old prints (including 21 incunabula), and several hundred magazines.

== Operations of the museum ==
The Museum organises museum classes related to the following areas of science:

- Ethnography: folk pottery - production and decoration techniques, costumes of Cieszyn and highlanders of Silesian Beskids, painted and carved cases - decoration techniques used in folk furniture production, rituals and habits.
- Art: the oldest art on the Cieszyn Silesia, father J.L. Szersznik Museum, burghers of Cieszyn - everyday life, art techniques, European decorative art - on the basis of the collection of B. Konczakowski, residences of the nobility of Cieszyn over the centuries.
- History: The Duchy of Cieszyn in the Middle Ages, rulers of Cieszyn: Piasts and Habsburgs, nobility and its role in the history of Cieszyn Silesia, the golden era of Cieszyn or urban economic and social development of the town at the beginning of the 20th century, the split of Cieszyn and Cieszyn Silesia in 1920, from euphoria to tragedy - Cieszyn Silesia in the first half of the 20th century, Cieszyn and Cieszyn Silesia in old photographs.

The Museum of Cieszyn Silesia is the main organiser of the Cieszyn Night of Museums. The Cieszyn Night of Museums takes place in May, a week after the Kraków and Katowice edition.

Once a year, the curator of the Museum of Cieszyn Silesia - Mariusz Makowski, gives a guided tour on the Trail of Blooming Magnolia Trees. The trail was created in 2001 thanks to the initiative of the curator. The walk takes place in spring (a specific date depending on the flowering period of the plants) and takes approx. 1 kilometre, along 11 stops. According to Mariusz Makowski the tradition of walks from magnolia tree to magnolia tree is related to town dwellers who left Cieszyn but used to come back to take this stroll.

Since 2003 in the courtyard of the Museum of Cieszyn Silesia and inside the cafeteria Cafe Muzeum (located in the former palace stable) so-called artistic fairs have been organised. They take place a few times per month before Christmas.

In September in the courtyard of the Museum and the Park of Peace a cyclical outdoor event is organised. It is called: Cieszyn layer cake – that is to say what is this tradition all about? The event is directed to children and young people and informs them about some traditions of Cieszyn Silesia.

== Branches of the museum ==
Apart from the permanent exhibition At the Crossroads of History and Culture, the Museum offers temporary exhibitions of varied themes. The branches of the Museum are located in the following places:

- Zofia Kossak-Szatkowska Museum in Górki Wielkie
- Gustaw Morcinek Museum in Skoczów
- Beskids Museum of Andrzej Podżorski in Wisła
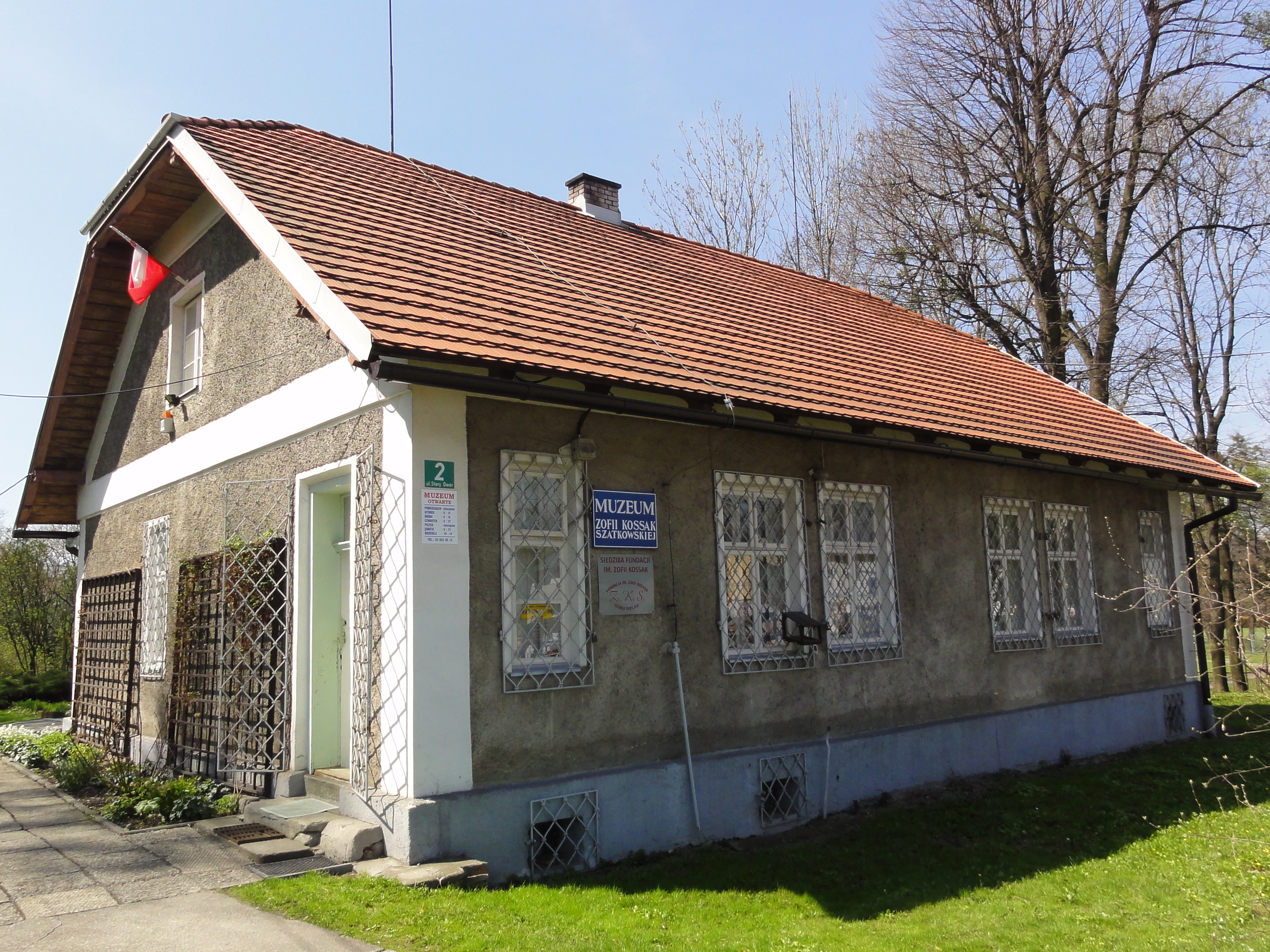
Zofia Kossak-Szatkowska Museum in Górki Wielkie

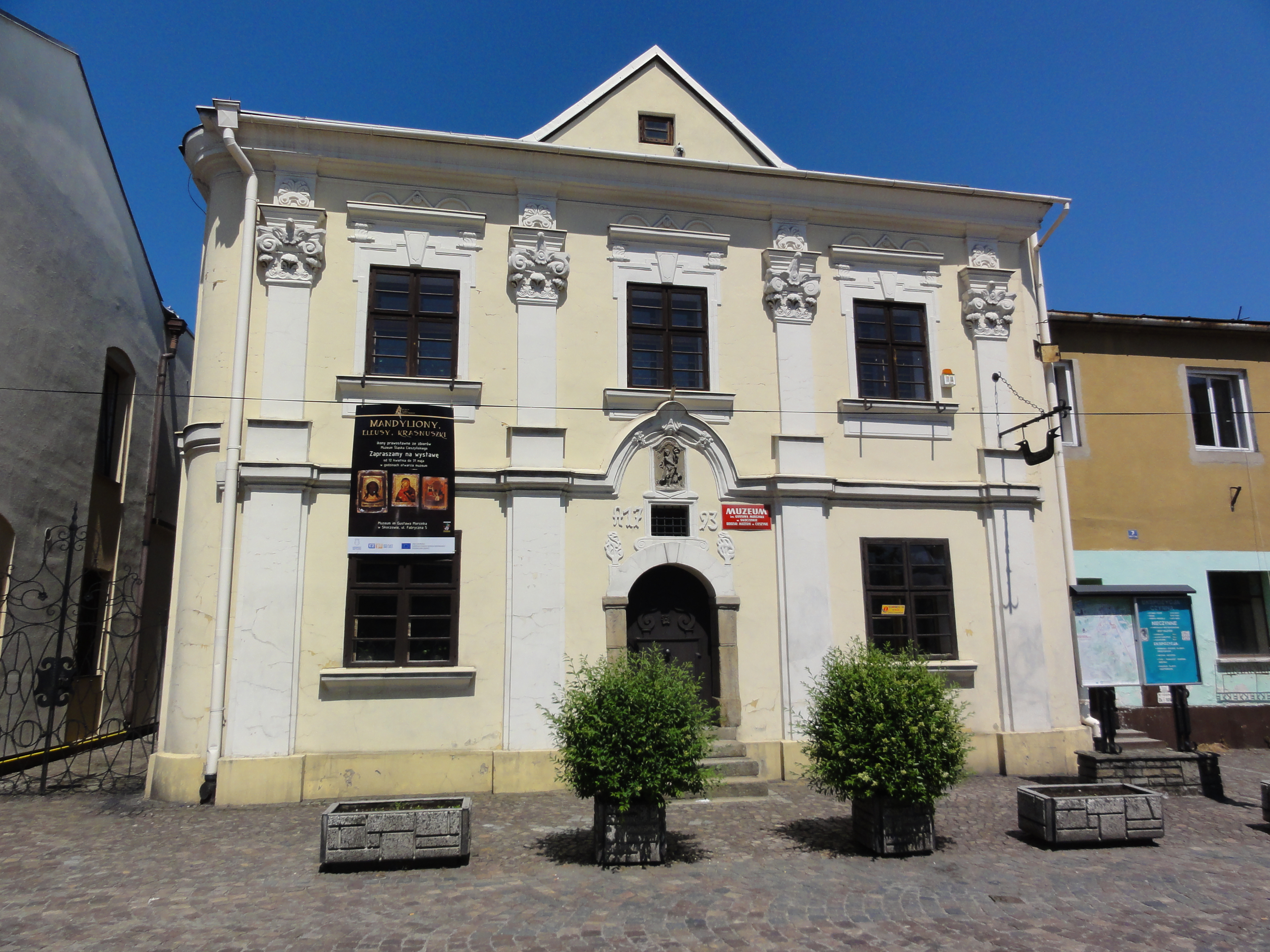
Gustaw Morcinek Museum in Skoczów

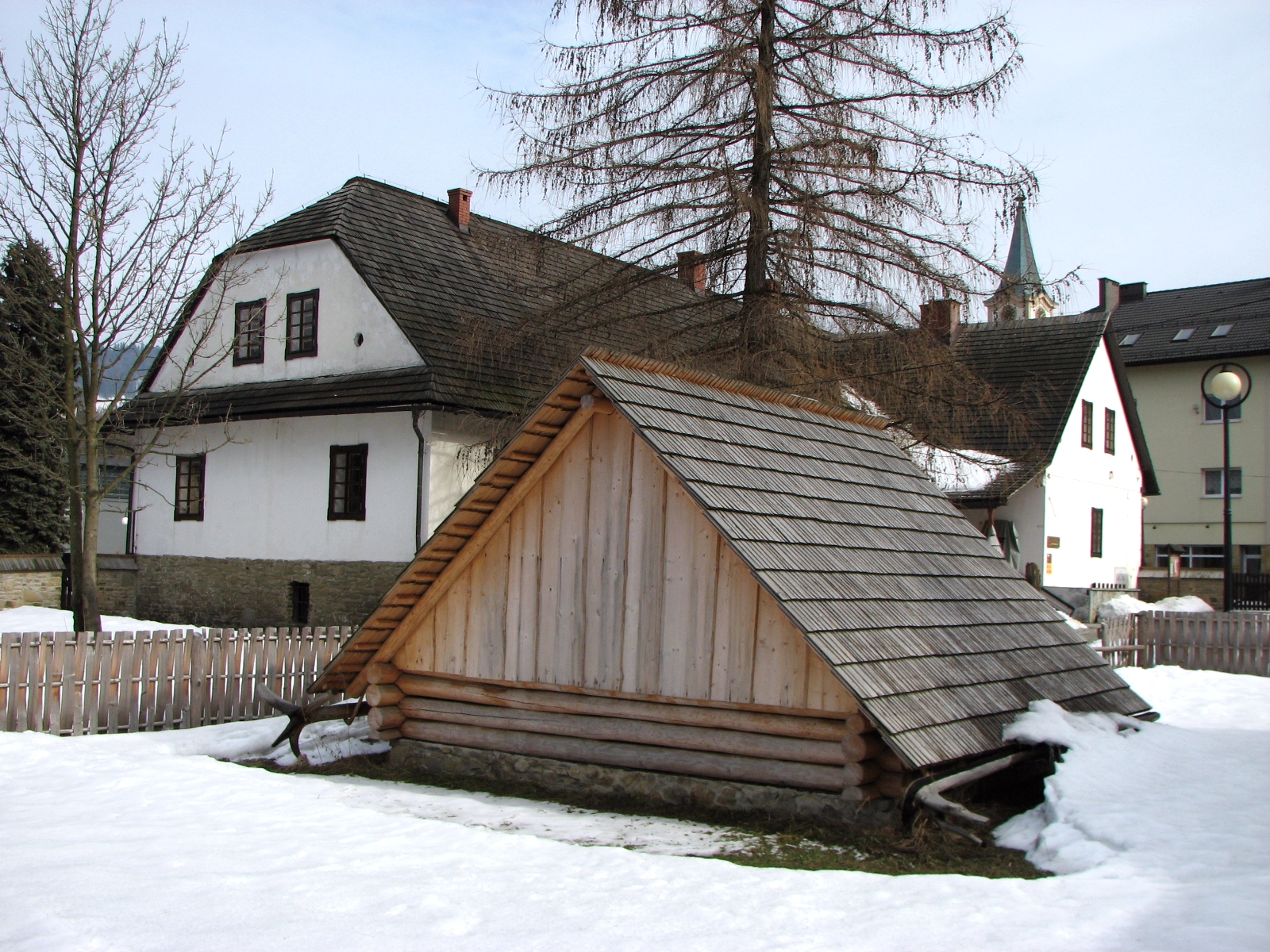
Beskids Museum, at the forefront a reconstruction of a shepherd's shelter in Wisła
