= Górki Małe, Silesian Voivodeship =

Górki Małe
- Village
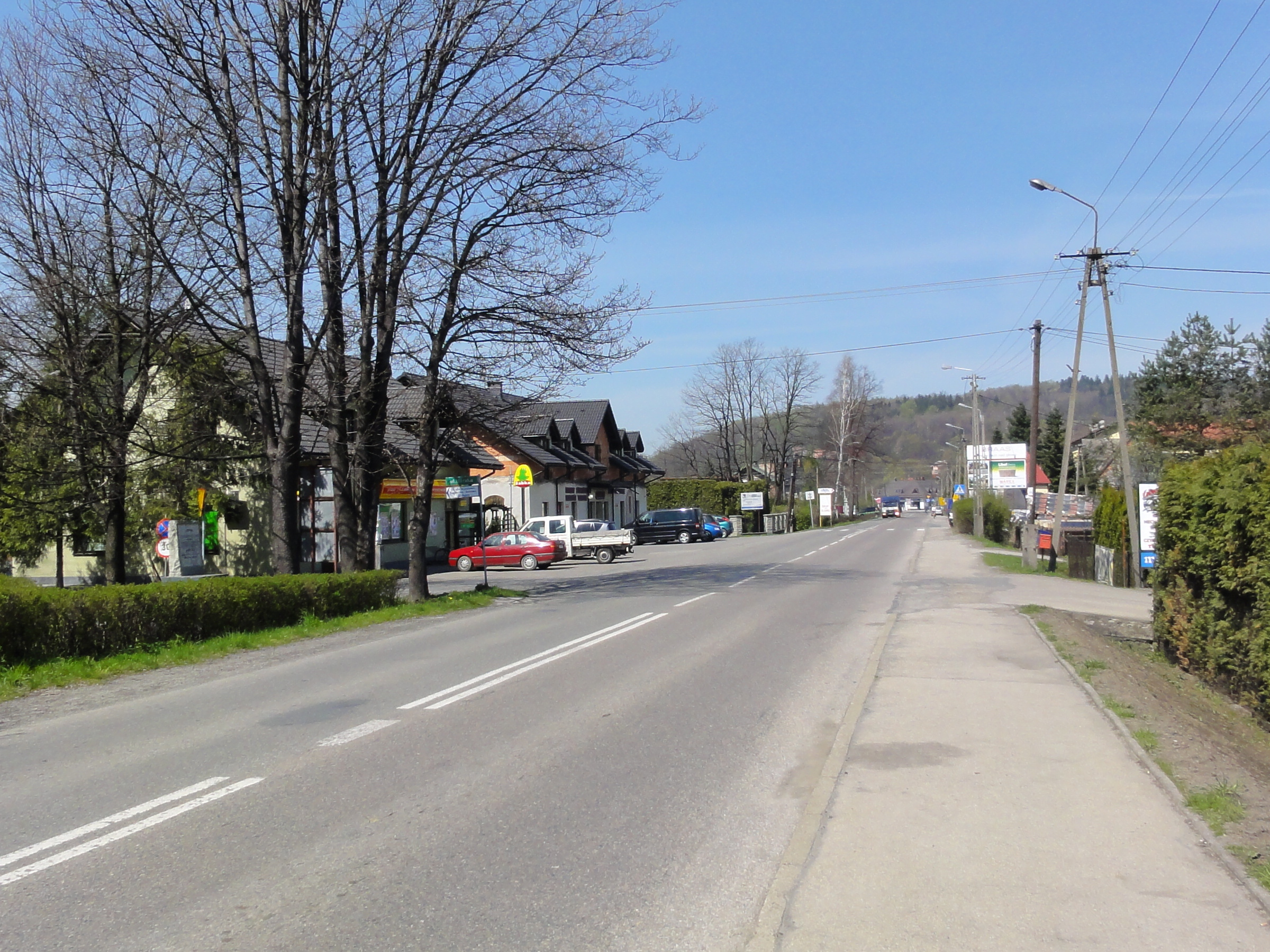
- Village centre

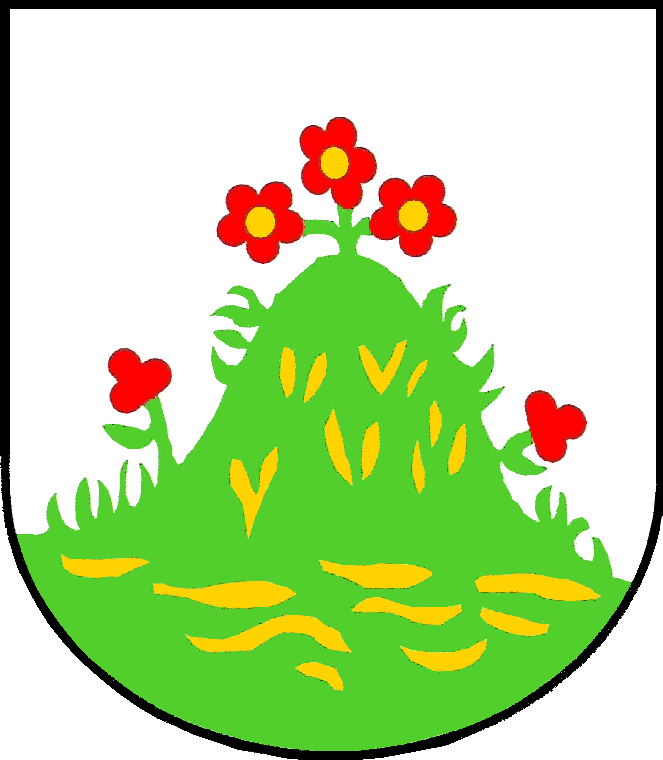
- Coat of arms

- Location within Poland
- Coordinates: 49°45′22.20″N 18°52′6.54″E
- Country: Poland
- Voivodeship: Silesian
- County: Cieszyn
- Gmina: Brenna
- First mentioned: 1305

Area
  - Total: 2.75 km^{2} (1.06 sq mi)

Population (2016)
  - Total: 819
  - Density: 298/km^{2} (771/sq mi)
- Time zone: UTC+1 (CET)
  - Summer (DST): UTC+2 (CEST)
- Postal code: 43-436
- Car plates: SCI

Górki Małe is a village in Gmina Brenna, Cieszyn County, Silesian Voivodeship, southern Poland. It lies in the historical region of Cieszyn Silesia.

== Etymology ==
The name of the village is of Polish origin and comes from the word góra, which means "hill".

== History ==
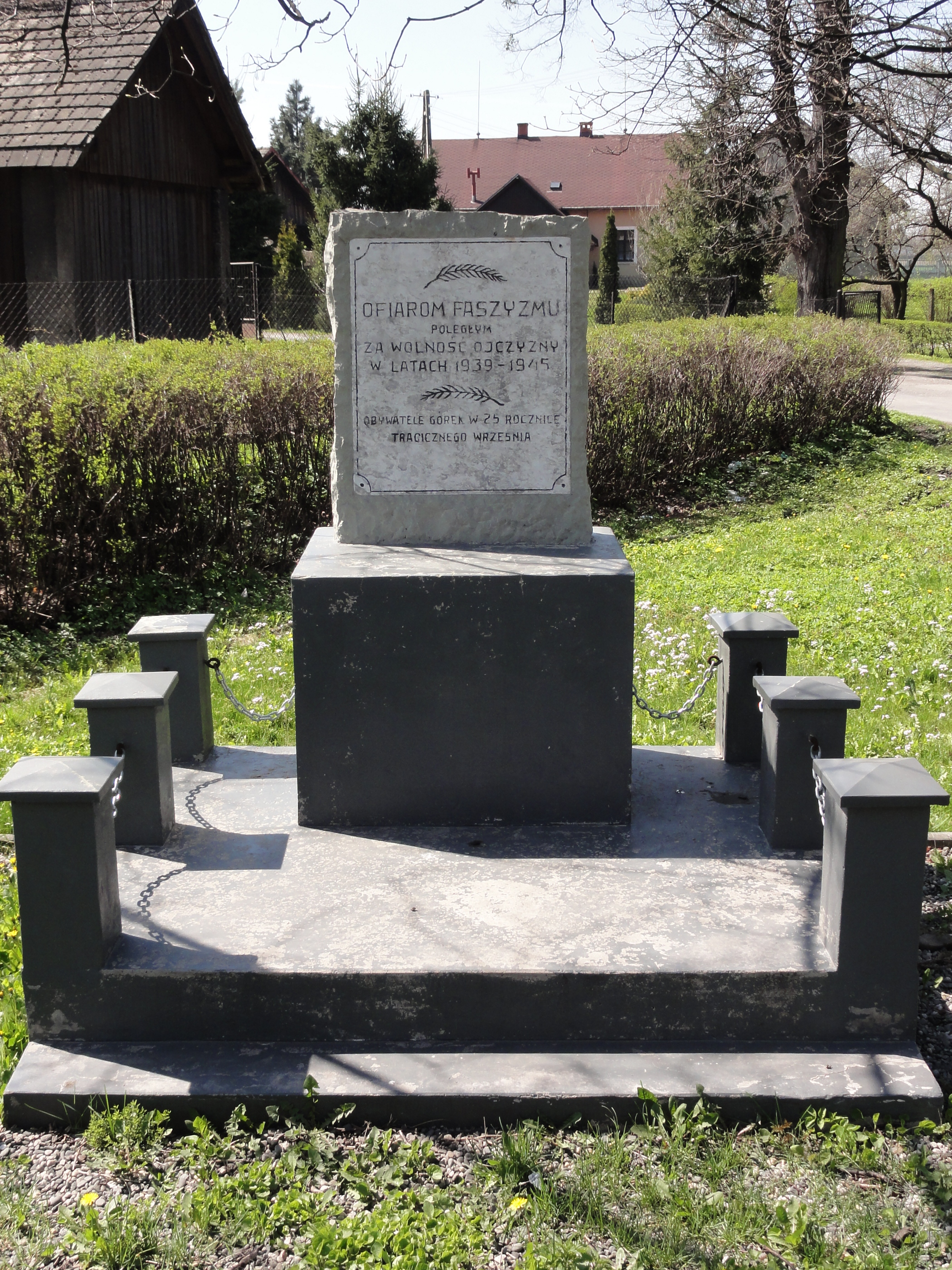
Memorial to victims of Nazi Germany during World War II

A Latin document of Diocese of Wrocław called Liber fundationis episcopatus Vratislaviensis from around 1305 lists Gorki villa vlodari thus mentioning what is now Górki Wielkie for the first time. However, it was written in an atypical form and suggests that a village was much older. The reason why it was inscribed to the document was connected to a process of extracting of a part of the village, which belonged wholly to dukes, to form a new village given to a knight. The part which remained in dukes hand was later called Górki Małe, while a knight's part Górki Wielkie. As so a village of Górki (Małe) functioned probably before 1290, when the Duchy of Cieszyn was formed (where both belonged ever since). From it was extracted a knights' villages which was then first mentioned in Liber fundationis... Explicitly it was later mentioned as [from] malych Gurek in 1566.

Politically both villages belonged initially to the Duchy of Cieszyn, formed in 1290 in the process of feudal fragmentation of Poland and was ruled by a local branch of Piast dynasty. In 1327 the duchy became a fee of the Kingdom of Bohemia, which after 1526 became part of the Habsburg monarchy.

In years 1573/1577–1594 it belonged to Skoczów-Strumień state country that was split from the Duchy of Cieszyn but was later purchased back. Since 1653 it belonged to Teschener Kammer.

After Revolutions of 1848 in the Austrian Empire a modern municipal division was introduced in the re-established Austrian Silesia. The village as a municipality was subscribed to the political district of Bielsko and the legal district of Skoczów. According to the censuses conducted in 1880, 1890, 1900 and 1910 the population of the municipality dropped from 351 in 1880 to 329 in 1910, with majority of the inhabitants being native Polish-speakers (98.3%-100%) and mostly Roman Catholics (90.6% in 1910), followed by Protestants (9.4% in 1910). The village was also traditionally inhabited by Cieszyn Vlachs, speaking Cieszyn Silesian dialect.

After World War I, fall of Austria-Hungary, Polish–Czechoslovak War and the division of Cieszyn Silesia in 1920, it became again part of Poland. It was then annexed by Nazi Germany at the beginning of World War II. After the war it was restored to Poland.
