= Těšínsko (magazine) =

- Executive editor: Rudolf Žáček
- Categories: Magazine
- Frequency: biyearly
- Publisher: Muzeum Těšínska
- First issue: November 1957
- Country: Czechoslovakia, Czech Republic
- Language: Czech
- Website: Official website
- ISSN: 0139-7605

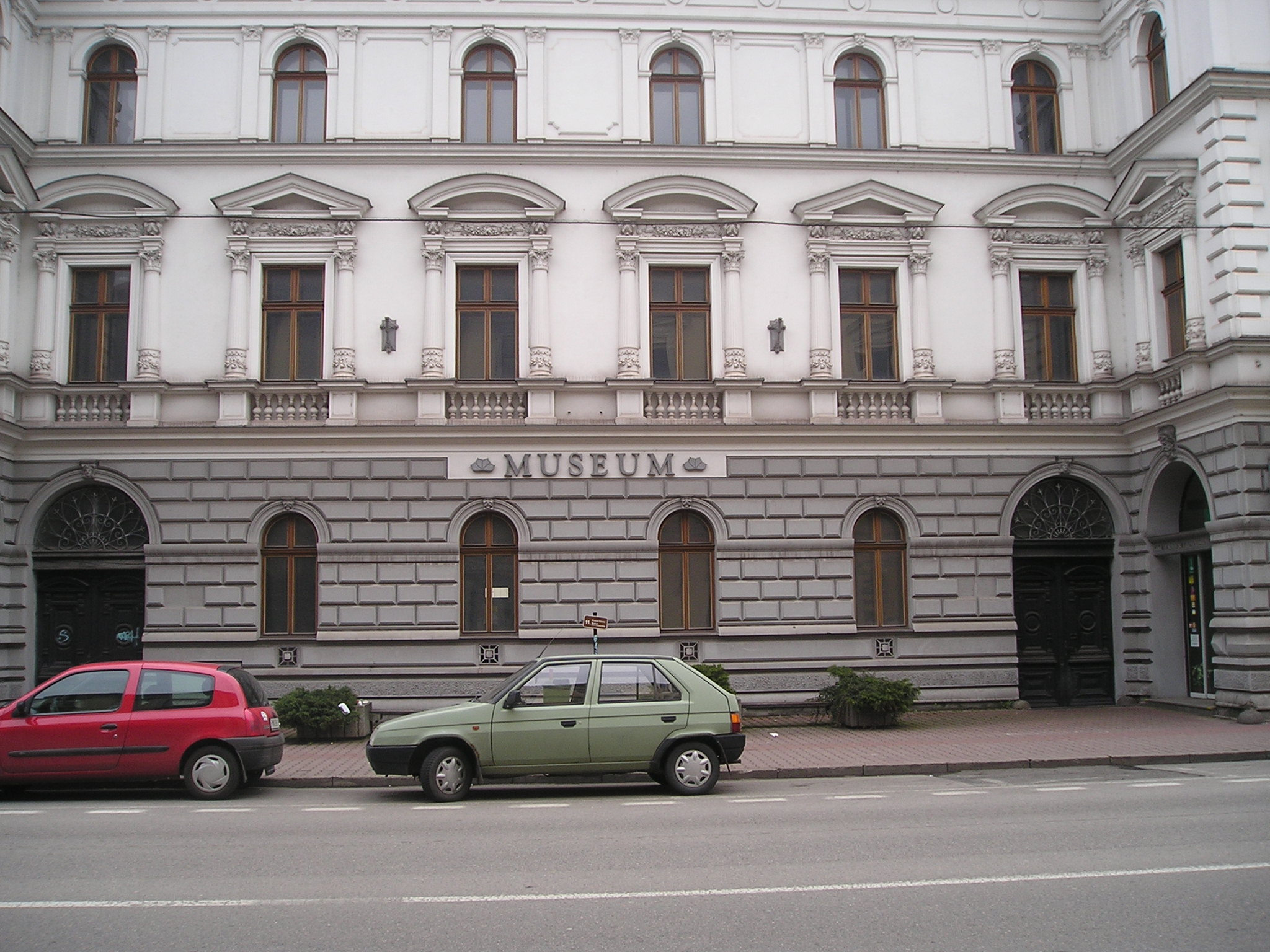
Former building of the Museum of the Cieszyn Region.

Těšínsko (meaning the "Cieszyn Silesia") is a regional magazine, published originally quarterly, currently twice a year by the Muzeum Těšínska in Český Těšín, Czech Republic. It focuses on the history and culture of the Czech part of Cieszyn Silesia.

== History and profile ==
The first issue appeared in November 1957 and since then the magazine appears in black and white A4 format. The publisher is Muzeum Těšínska.

In the 1990s more Polish authors contributed to the magazine, as a consequence the prestige of the magazine grown and it gained more readers.

Many regional historians and researchers contributed to the magazine, e.g. Mečislav Borák, Andělín Grobelný, Bedřich Havlíček, Karol Daniel Kadłubiec, Óndra Łysohorsky, Idzi Panic, Janusz Spyra, Miloš Trapl, Jaroslav Valenta, Rudolf Žáček, Stanisław Zahradnik and others.
