= Górki Wielkie =

- Village
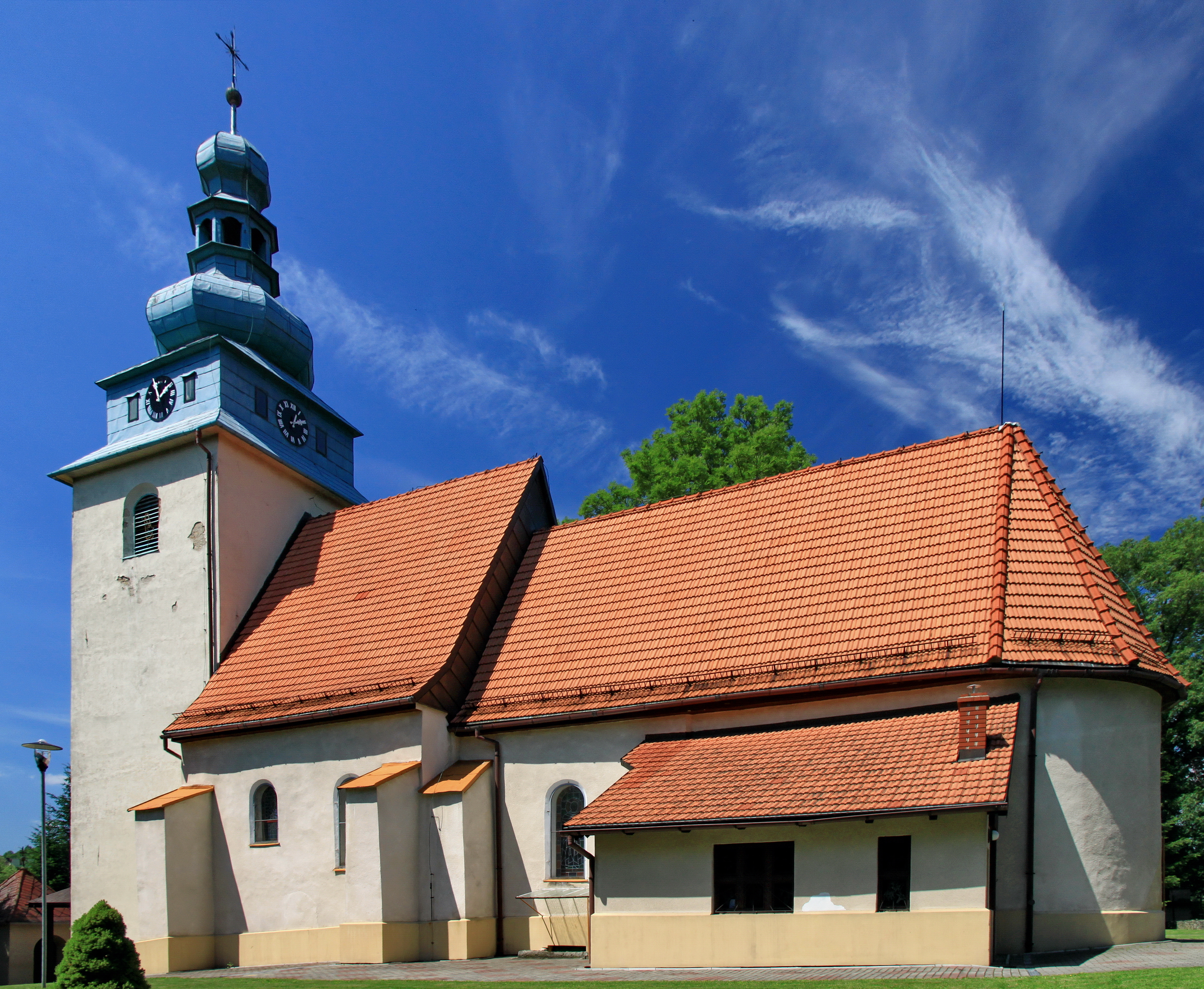
- All Saints parish church

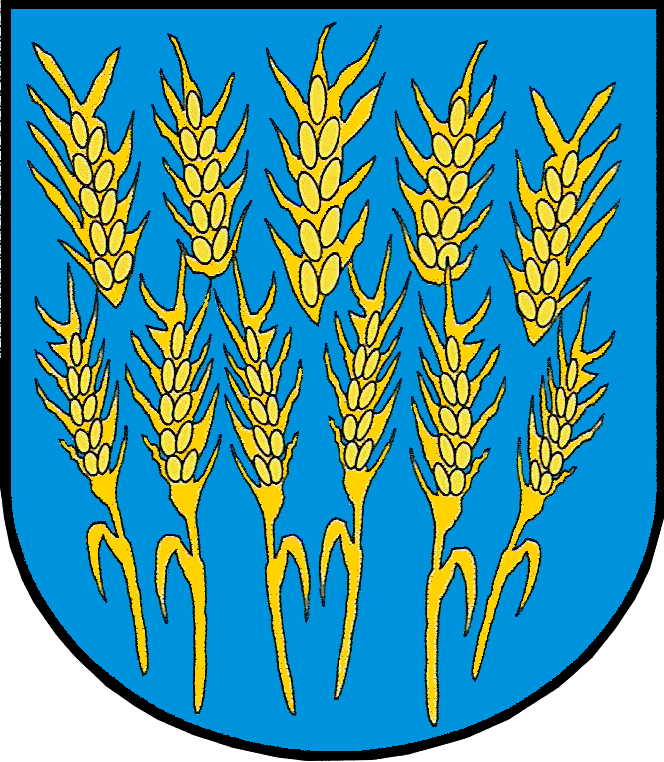
- Coat of arms

- Location within Poland
- Coordinates: 49°46′22.10″N 18°51′14.42″E
- Country: Poland
- Voivodeship: Silesian
- County: Cieszyn
- Gmina: Brenna
- First mentioned: 1305

Area
  - Total: 14.67 km^{2} (5.66 sq mi)

Population (2016)
  - Total: 3,950
  - Density: 269/km^{2} (697/sq mi)
- Time zone: UTC+1 (CET)
  - Summer (DST): UTC+2 (CEST)
- Postal code: 43-436
- Car plates: SCI

Górki Wielkie [ˈɡurki ˈvjɛlkʲɛ] is a village in Gmina Brenna, Cieszyn County, Silesian Voivodeship, southern Poland. It lies in the historical region of Cieszyn Silesia.

== Etymology ==
The name of the village is of Polish origin and comes from the word góra, which means "hill".

== History ==
The village was first mentioned in a Latin document of Diocese of Wrocław called Liber fundationis episcopatus Vratislaviensis from around 1305 as Item in Gorki villa vlodari. It was written in an atypical form and suggests that a village was much older. The reason why it was inscribed to the document was connected to a process of extracting of a part of the village, which belonged wholly to dukes, to form a new village given to a knight. The part which remained in dukes hand was later called Górki Małe, while a knights' part Górki Wielkie. As so a village of Górki (Małe) functioned probably before 1290, when the Duchy of Cieszyn was formed (where both belonged ever since). From it was extracted a knights' villages which was then first mentioned in Liber fundationis...

Politically the village belonged initially to the Duchy of Cieszyn, formed in 1290 in the process of feudal fragmentation of Poland and was ruled by a local branch of Piast dynasty. In 1327 the duchy became a fee of Kingdom of Bohemia, which after 1526 became part of the Habsburg monarchy.

The village became a seat of a Catholic parish, mentioned in the register of Peter's Pence payment from 1447 among 50 parishes of Cieszyn deanery as Gorky.

After the 1540s Protestant Reformation prevailed in the Duchy of Cieszyn and a local Catholic church was taken over by Lutherans. It was taken from them (as one of around fifty buildings) in the region by a special commission and given back to the Roman Catholic Church on 18 April 1654.

After Revolutions of 1848 in the Austrian Empire a modern municipal division was introduced in the re-established Austrian Silesia. The village as a municipality was subscribed to the political district of Bielsko and the legal district of Skoczów. According to the censuses conducted in 1880, 1890, 1900 and 1910 the population of the municipality dropped from 1036 in 1880 to 1034 in 1910, with majority of the inhabitants being native Polish-speakers (98%-100%) and mostly Roman Catholics (83.4% in 1910), followed by Protestants (15.8% in 1910) and Jews (9 people). The village was also traditionally inhabited by Cieszyn Vlachs, speaking Cieszyn Silesian dialect.

After World War I, fall of Austria-Hungary, Polish–Czechoslovak War and the division of Cieszyn Silesia in 1920, it became again part of Poland. It was then annexed by Nazi Germany at the beginning of World War II. After the war it was restored to Poland.

== People ==
Polish writer Zofia Kossak-Szczucka lived here from 1924 and is buried here. There is also a museum dedicated to her in Górki Wielkie.

== Gallery ==
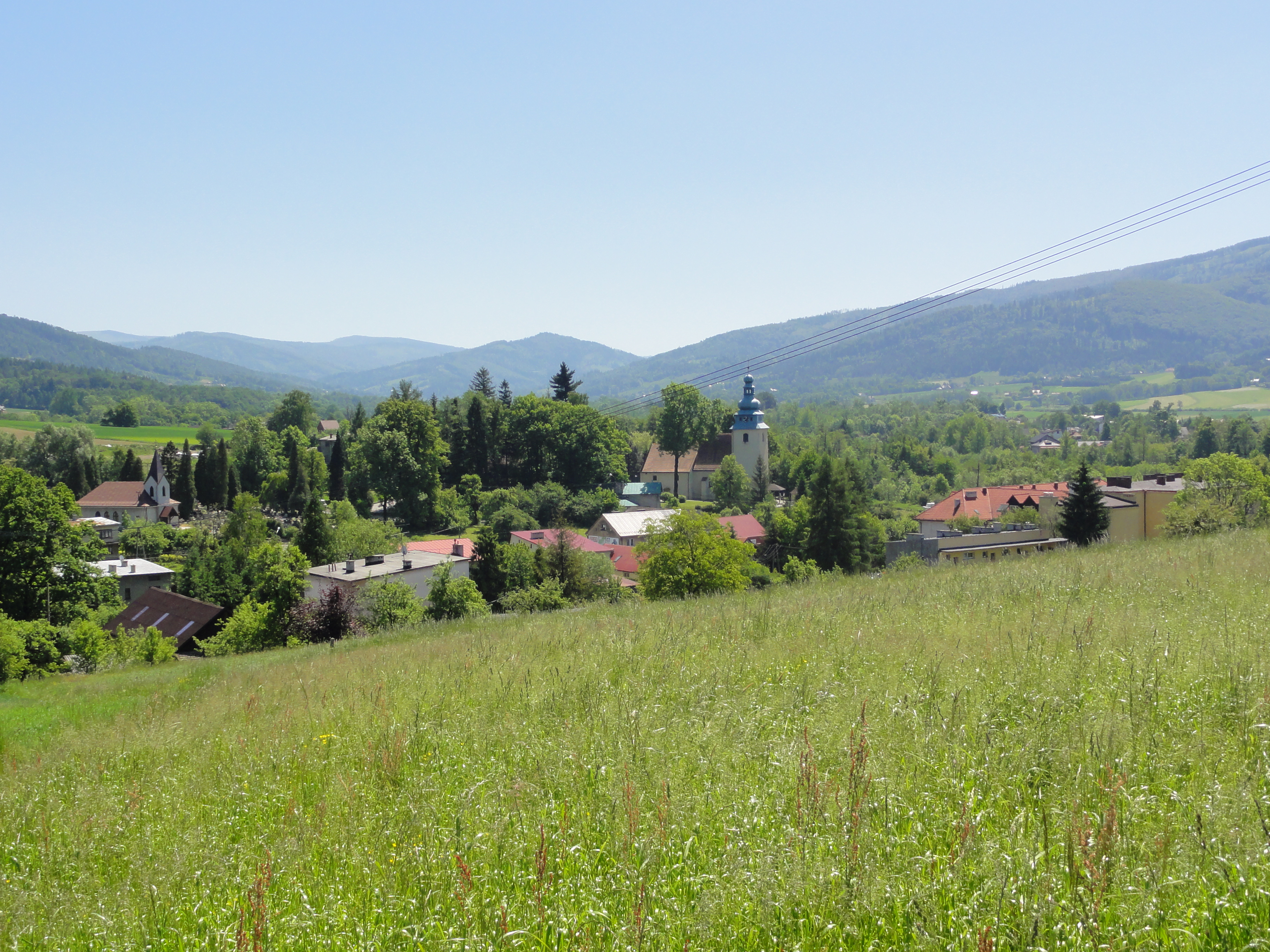
General view of the village

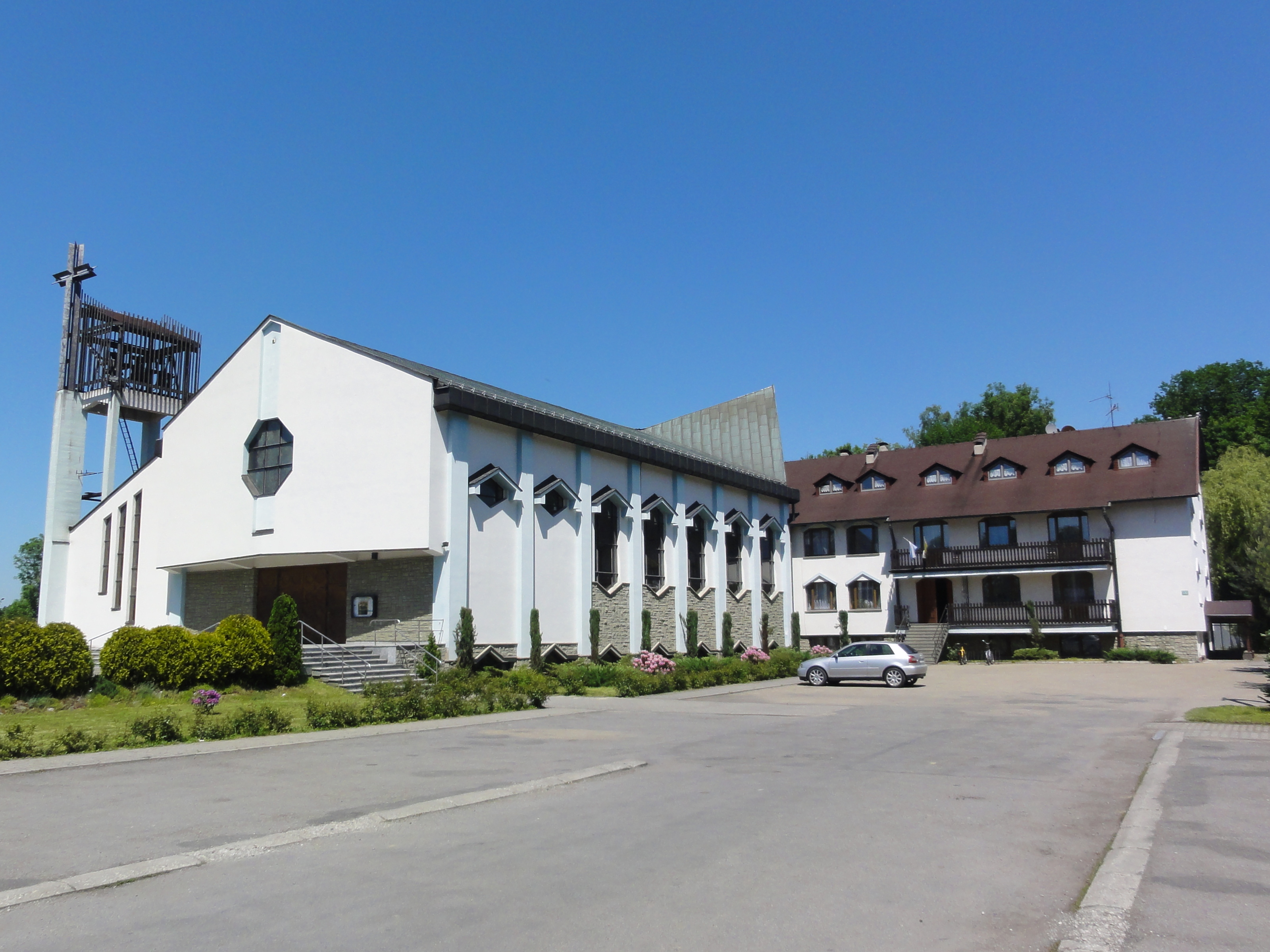
Jan Sarkander Church

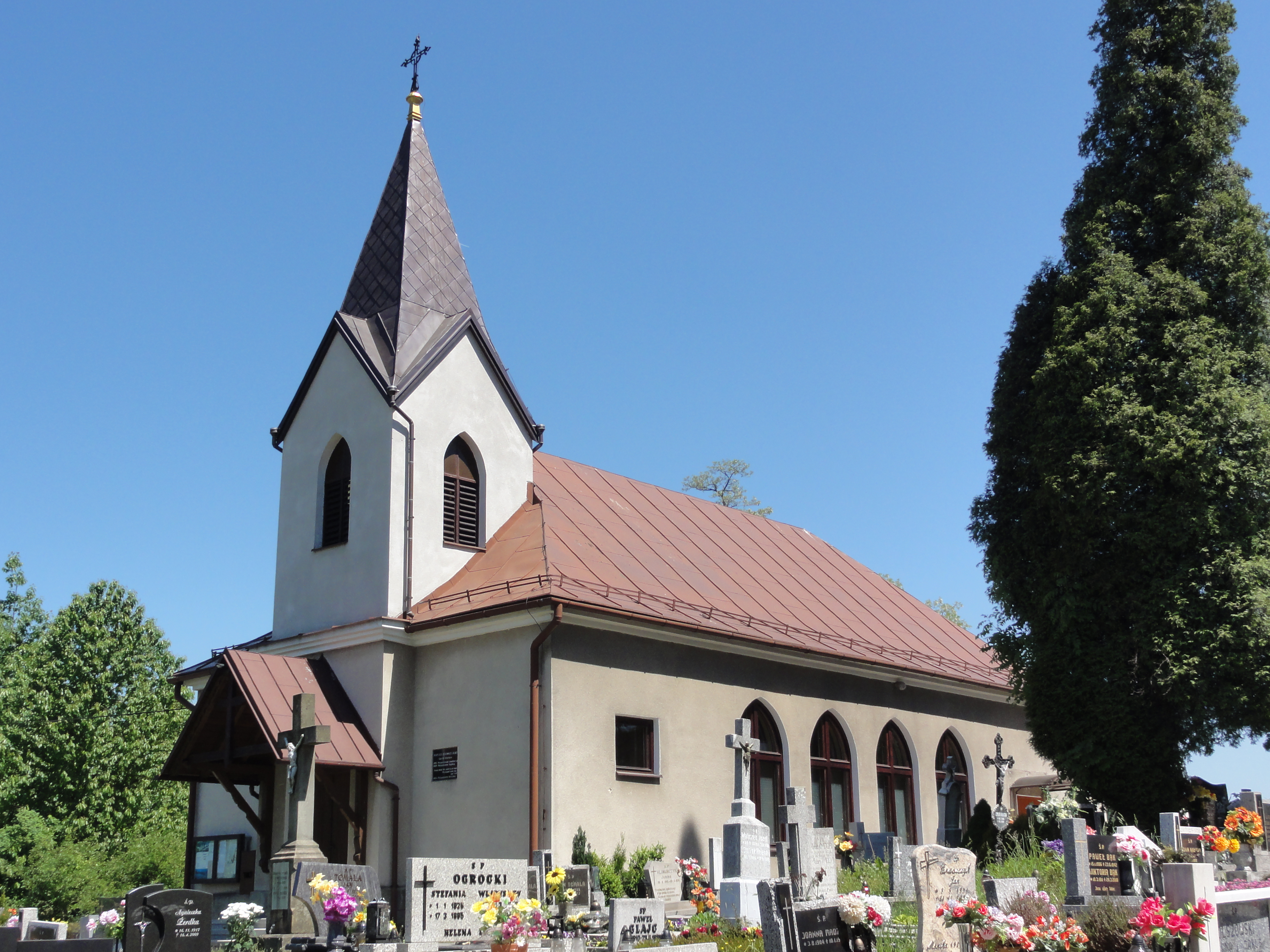
Lutheran church of St. John the Evangelist

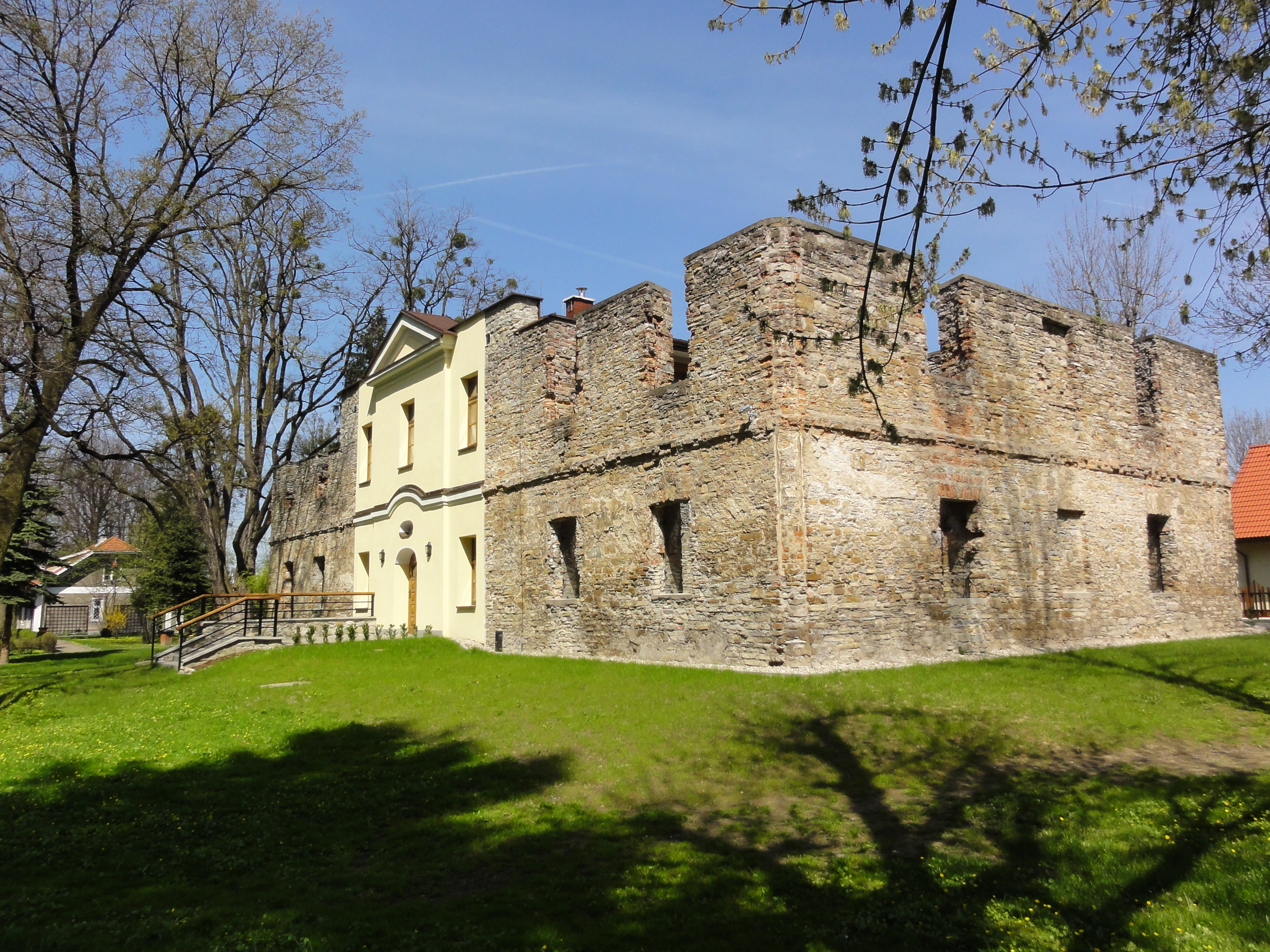
Ruins of a manor house
