= Kończyce =

Kończyce may refer to the following places in Poland:

- Kończyce, Lower Silesian Voivodeship (south-west Poland)
- Kończyce, Kuyavian-Pomeranian Voivodeship (north-central Poland)
- Kończyce Małe, Silesian Voivodeship
- Kończyce Wielkie, Silesian Voivodeship
- Kończyce, Lesser Poland Voivodeship (south Poland)
- Kończyce, Subcarpathian Voivodeship (south-east Poland)

In the Czech Republic:

- Kunčice (Polish: Kończyce Wielkie), part of Ostrava
- Kunčičky (Polish: Kończyce Małe), part of Ostrava
