= Mieszko Oak =

Oak tree in Cieszyn County, Poland

- Dąb Mieszko
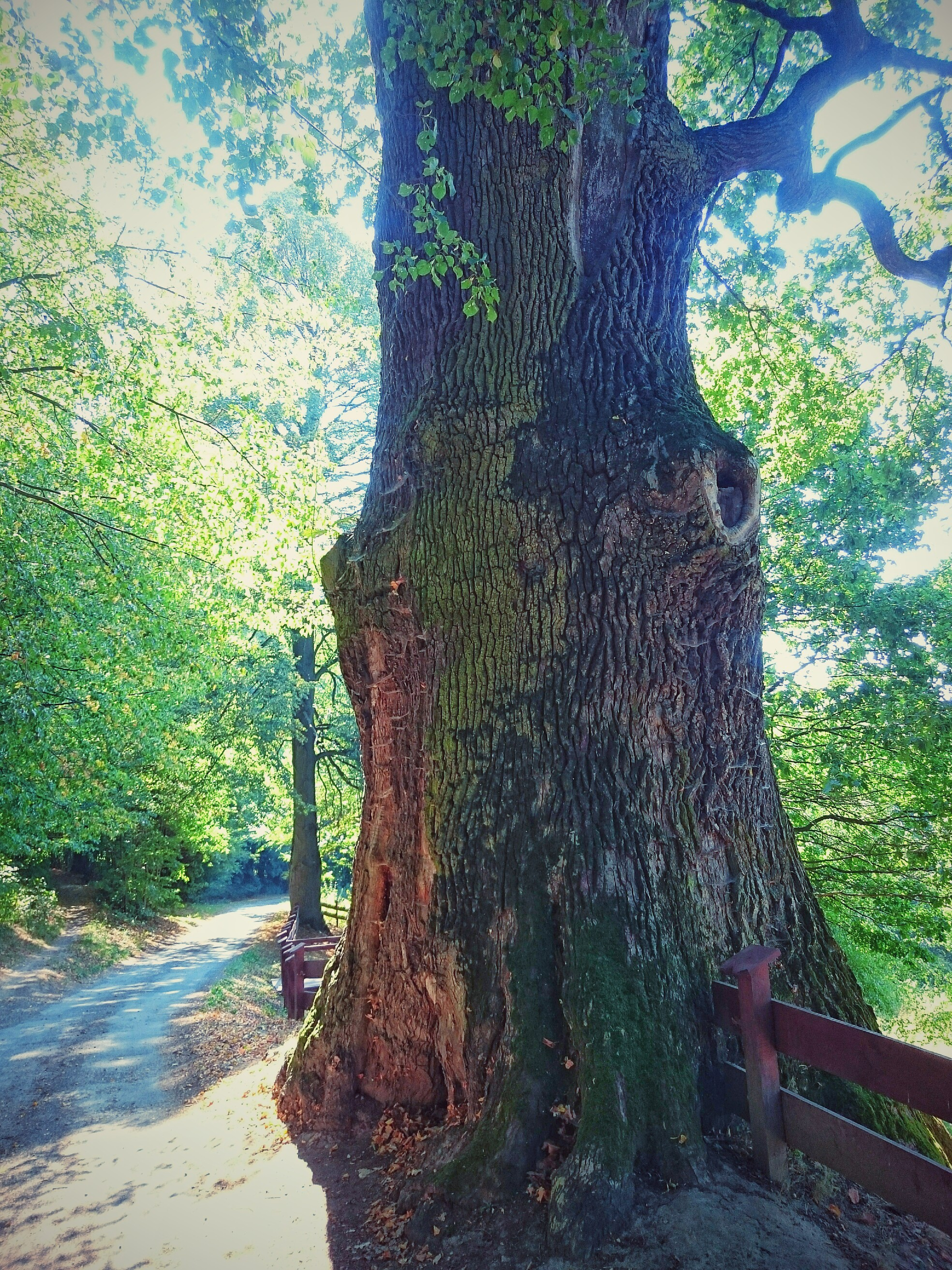
- Trunk of the oak from the western side
- Interactive map of Mieszko Oak
- Location: Kończyce Wielkie; Poland
- Coordinates: 49°50′19.56″N 18°38′29.75″E
- Type: natural monument, pedunculate oak
- Height: 30 m (98 ft)
- Inauguration date: 1954

Mieszko Oak (Polish: Dąb Mieszko) is a monumental pedunculate oak growing in Kończyce Wielkie, in Gmina Hażlach, Cieszyn County, Poland. It is one of a pair of impressive oaks – next to it stands a smaller oak named Przemko Oak. The trees are located on Dolna Street, 25 meters from the palace park in Kończyce Wielkie. The oaks are situated on a hill called Karłowski Kopiec, which descends to the nearby small river, Petrůvka. The tree, with a circumference of over 8.5 meters, has a long history of protection, having been legally protected for the first time in 1935, with the current legal basis for its protection being the 2005 regulation of the Silesian voivode.

== Age and size ==
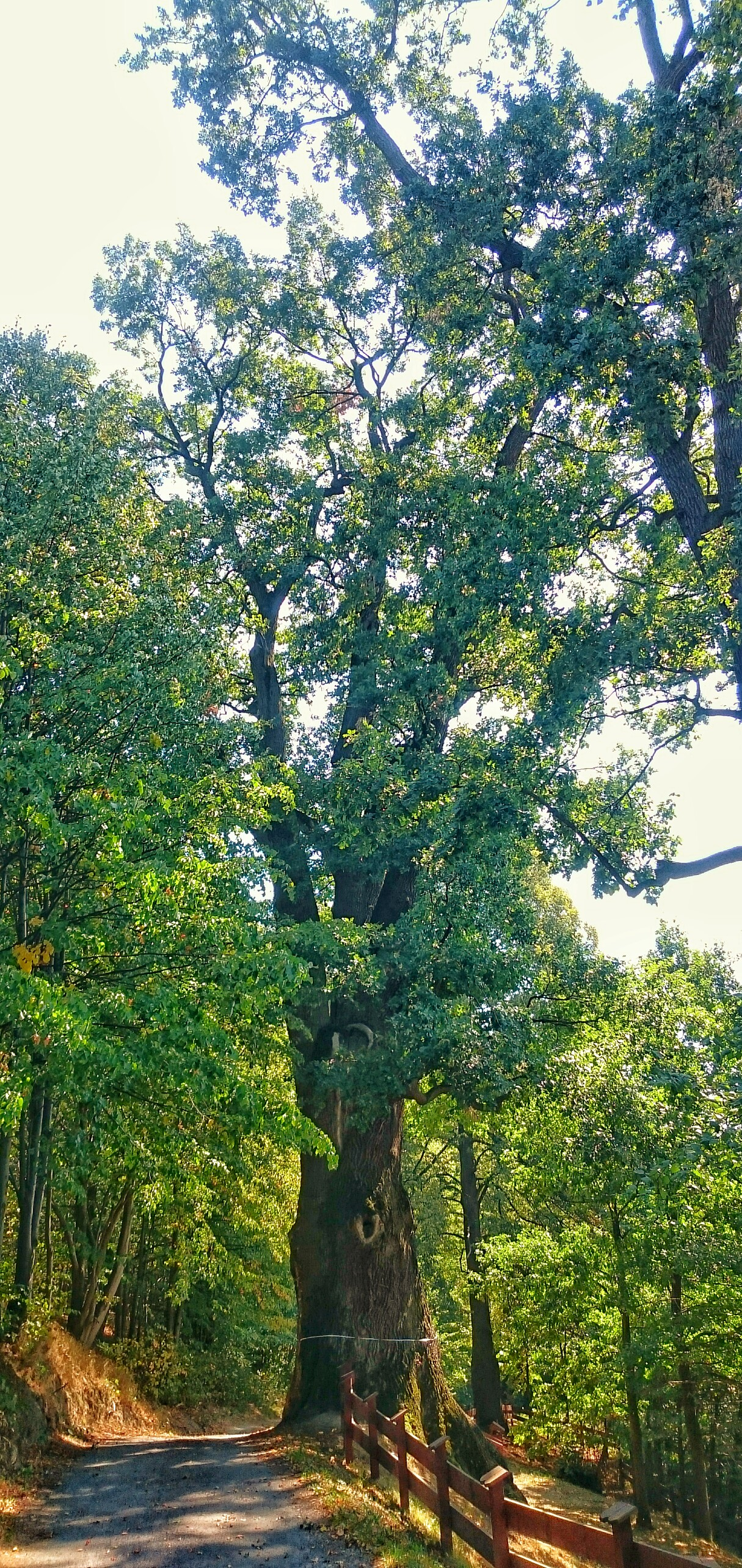
Tree's trunk, along with part of the crown from the western side, visible during circumference measurement

Mieszko Oak is the thickest oak in the Silesian Voivodeship. Its age is estimated to be over 500 years, though according to local legends, it could be as old as 750 years. The trunk of the tree is hollow (empty), as the locals say, which is said to indicate the advanced age of the specimen.

In 2013, the circumference of the tree was 851 cm (in 2015, it was reported to be 856 cm), and its height was 30 meters.

The oak is characterized by a massive, very broad root collar, which developed due to the tree growing on a steep bank leading to the Petrůvka river. On the side of the local road, there is a small tree hollow, and on the eastern side of the tree, a secured chimney-like cavity is visible. At a height of about 8–10 meters, the trunk splits into three branches, forming the impressive crown of the Mieszko Oak.

== Legends ==
According to legend, in 1683, part of the Polish hussars, while passing through the Cieszyn Silesia region, stopped in Kończyce Wielkie. Near the castle, soldiers set up their tents, and the tired horses were watered in the nearby Petrůvka river. Unfortunately, some of the horses died during the arduous march and were buried near the old oaks. The count of Kończyce gave several of his horses as compensation, and the hussars continued their journey the following day. It is said that when the banners left the village, the sound of hooves and the wistful neighing of horses could still be heard. For years, these sounds continued to echo near the oaks, and people avoided the place, whispering among themselves that the spirits of the hussar horses haunted the park. Only when a carved cross was hung on one of the trees and the place was consecrated with water did the mysterious sounds cease.

Oral accounts reveal that in the 19th century, a spring with crystal-clear water flowed near the oaks. Countess Gabriela von Thun und Hohenstein, the owner of the palace in Kończyce, drank a glass of this water every day for health. She also funded a small chapel, which was hung on one of the oaks. Today, a newer version of this chapel can be found, made of light wood, with a gable roof and an image of the Virgin Mary with Child.

The water from the oaks was believed to have saved a certain baron, who, in gratitude, funded a votive chapel. The chapel was expanded in 1893, and the Chapel of Divine Providence was established. During droughts, residents of the surrounding villages would come there to pray for rain. As the folk tale goes, in the 1870s, after many days of prayers, manna is said to have appeared from the heavens, which people collected in their hats and aprons, rejoicing in such generous and much-needed help from Divine Providence.

== History ==
=== Facts behind the 17th-century legend ===
The facts seem to partially confirm the legends and stories surrounding the Mieszko Oak. In 1683, significant Polish military forces passed through Kończyce. This was the corps of Polish Hetman Mikołaj Hieronim Sieniawski, consisting of 6,000 soldiers of elite cavalry. In July of that year, 10 cavalry banners and a dragoons regiment, under the command of royal guard Stefan Bidziński, were sent to the areas of Bielsko and Żywiec. On 14 August 1683, Hetman Sieniawski's corps reached Cieszyn. It is highly likely that one of the aforementioned units arrived in Kończyce, giving rise to the legend.

=== Oak in interwar publications ===
The trees were first described by Silesian forester and nature conservation worker Andrzej Czudek in the then Silesian Voivodeship. In his 1929 publication Osobliwości i zabytki przyrody województwa śląskiego (Natural Wonders and Monuments of Silesia), he noted that "Very thick commemorative oaks can be found on the estate of Count Thun, and the owner carefully protects them".

Additionally, in the works of Andrzej Środa, information about the oaks in Kończyce Wielkie was provided. In Inwentarz zabytkowych dębów w Polsce (Inventory of Historical Oaks in Poland), published in the Ochrona Przyrody journal (Volume 14/1934), it was mentioned that one of the oaks near the castle had a circumference of 800 cm – likely referring to the Mieszko Oak.

In 1935, Uzupełnienie inwentarza zabytkowych dębów w Polsce (Supplement to the Inventory of Historical Oaks in Poland), also published in Ochrona Przyrody (Volume 15/1935), noted that the Kończyce oaks were legally protected that year. The trees were officially designated as monuments in 1954.

In 1937, Stanisław Berezowski mentioned the "old oaks" in the manor park in Kończyce Wielkie in his tourist guide to the Silesian Voivodeship. However, it is unclear whether he was specifically referring to the Mieszko and Przemko oaks.

In another publication from 1938, Ochrona przyrody w województwie śląskim (Nature Conservation in the Silesian Voivodeship), Czudek described several old oaks near the Kończyce castle. While he did not mention the Mieszko Oak, he emphasized the care and attention given by the owner, Count Thun, to preserve the historic trees. The park was described as having a significant number of large and impressive oaks, maintaining a very natural character. It was also noted that the owner had taken steps to install lightning rods on the tallest oaks to preserve them for as long as possible.

=== Mieszko in later studies ===
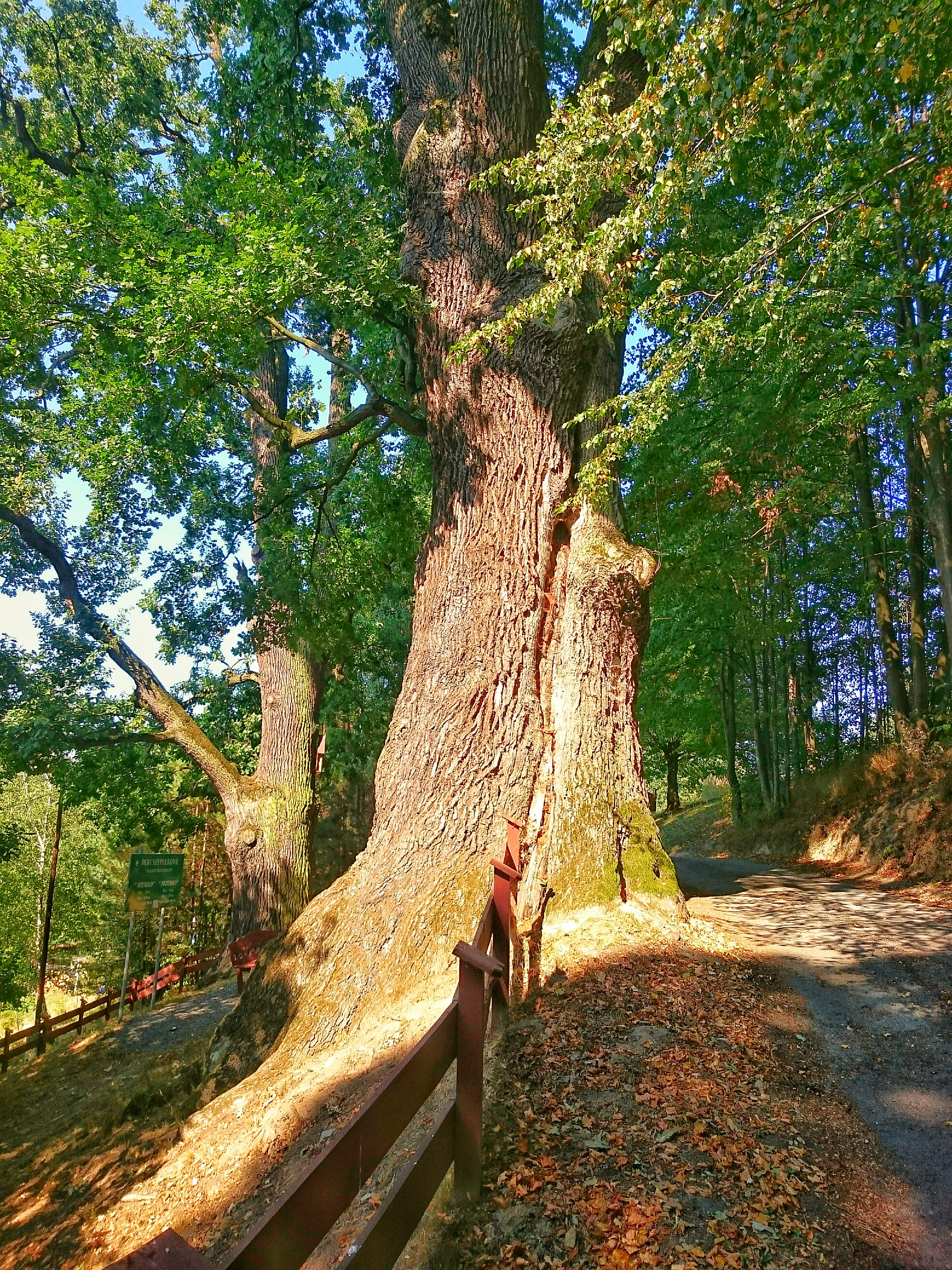
Mieszko Oak with its impressive root flare

The 1956 book Osobliwości przyrody między Olzą a górną Wartą (Natural Wonders Between the Olza and Upper Warta) by Józef Dudziak, Stefan Gut, and Roman Krzywoń noted the oak and estimated its age at 700 years, a figure likely exaggerated.

The 1969 nature album Piękno polskiej ziemi. Ochrona przyrody w województwie katowickim (The Beauty of Polish Land: Nature Conservation in the Katowice Voivodeship) included Mieszko in its register of natural monuments, citing a circumference of 840 cm and an estimated age of 600 years.

Similar references to the Kończyce oak appeared in the 1997 publication Przyroda województwa bielskiego. Stan poznania, zagrożenia i ochrona (Nature of the Bielsko Voivodeship: State of Knowledge, Threats, and Protection) and the book Osobliwości szaty roślinnej województwa bielskiego (Natural Wonders of the Bielsko Voivodeship) overseen by Andrzej Blarowski, a conservation officer. Mieszko was again recognized as the region's largest oak in the 1999 book Osobliwości przyrodnicze województwa śląskiego (Natural Wonders of the Silesian Voivodeship). Photographs of the tree featured in an article on natural monuments in the Silesian Voivodeship, published in Przyroda Górnego Śląska (Issue 29/2002).

=== Origin of the oak's name ===
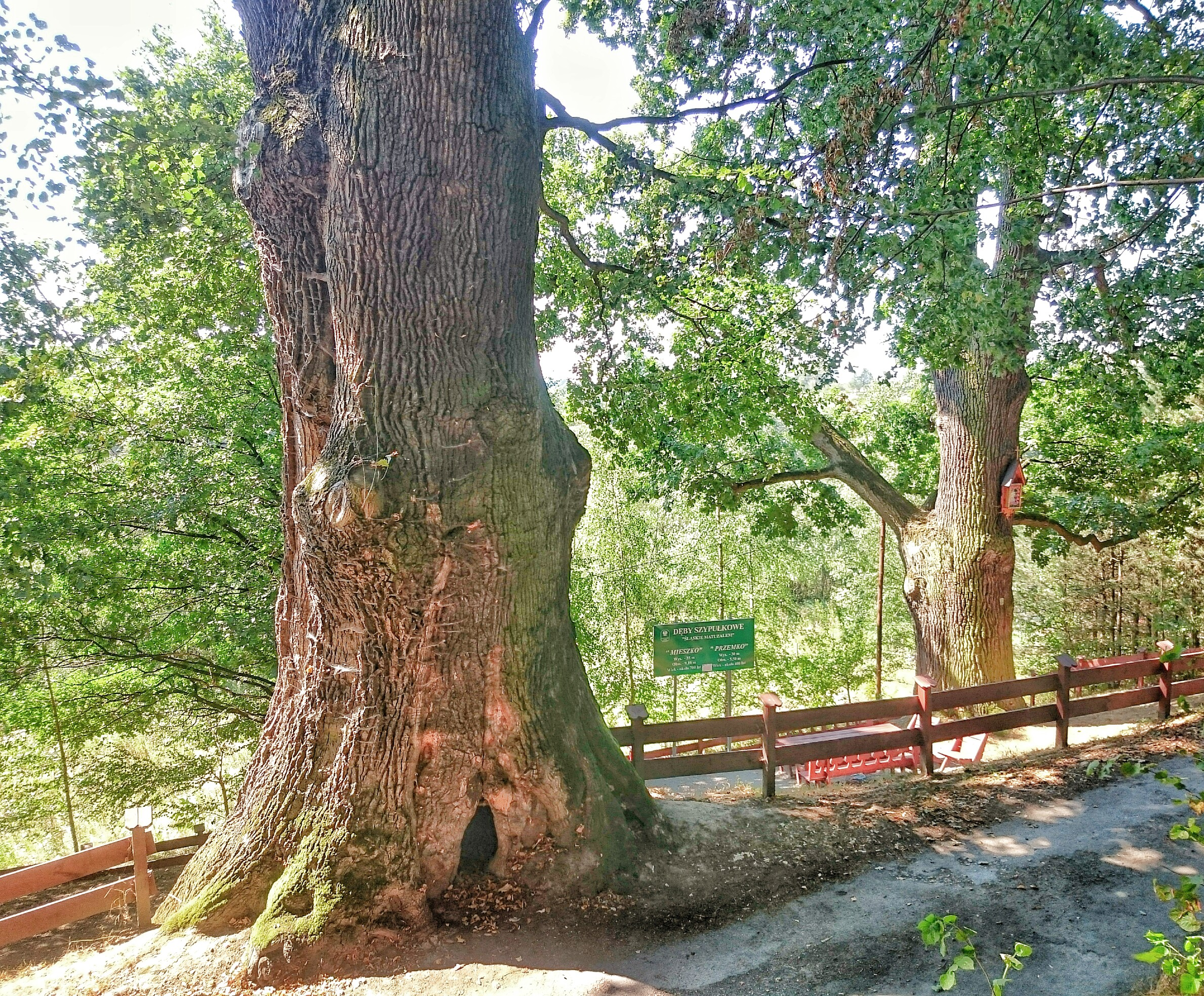
Mieszko and Przemko oaks visible from the side of the hill

The names of the two prominent oaks, Mieszko and Przemko, were officially assigned in 2005 by the Silesian Voivode. The names commemorate historical rulers of the region – Mieszko I, who lived at the turn of the 13th and 14th centuries, and Przemysław II, who reigned during the 15th century.

== Protection and conservation ==
=== Legal protection ===
The Mieszko Oak has been under legal protection since the interwar period. Along with other notable specimens in the area, it was designated a natural monument by the Silesian Voivodeship Office's decree No. A.II. 2a/2 on 7 October 1935.

On 22 December 1954, it was officially recognized as a natural monument by the National Council in Katowice. The current legal basis for its protection is Decree No. 35/05 of the Silesian Voivode, issued on 8 August 2005, which declared both Mieszko and Przemko as natural monuments.

=== Conservation efforts ===
Professional care for the oak was first undertaken in 1988 by the Green Areas Management and Maintenance Company of Bielsko-Biała. This included removing a large, partially dead branch, cleaning and chemically preserving a hollow cavity inside the trunk, and improving the tree's ventilation by enlarging a natural opening at the main branch junction to hinder fungal growth.

Further maintenance was carried out in 1996, focusing on cleaning the hollow cavity, where debris, leaves, and rotted wood had previously been set on fire. Specialists from the Tree Maintenance and Treatment Company of Ustroń performed this work.

== Tourism ==
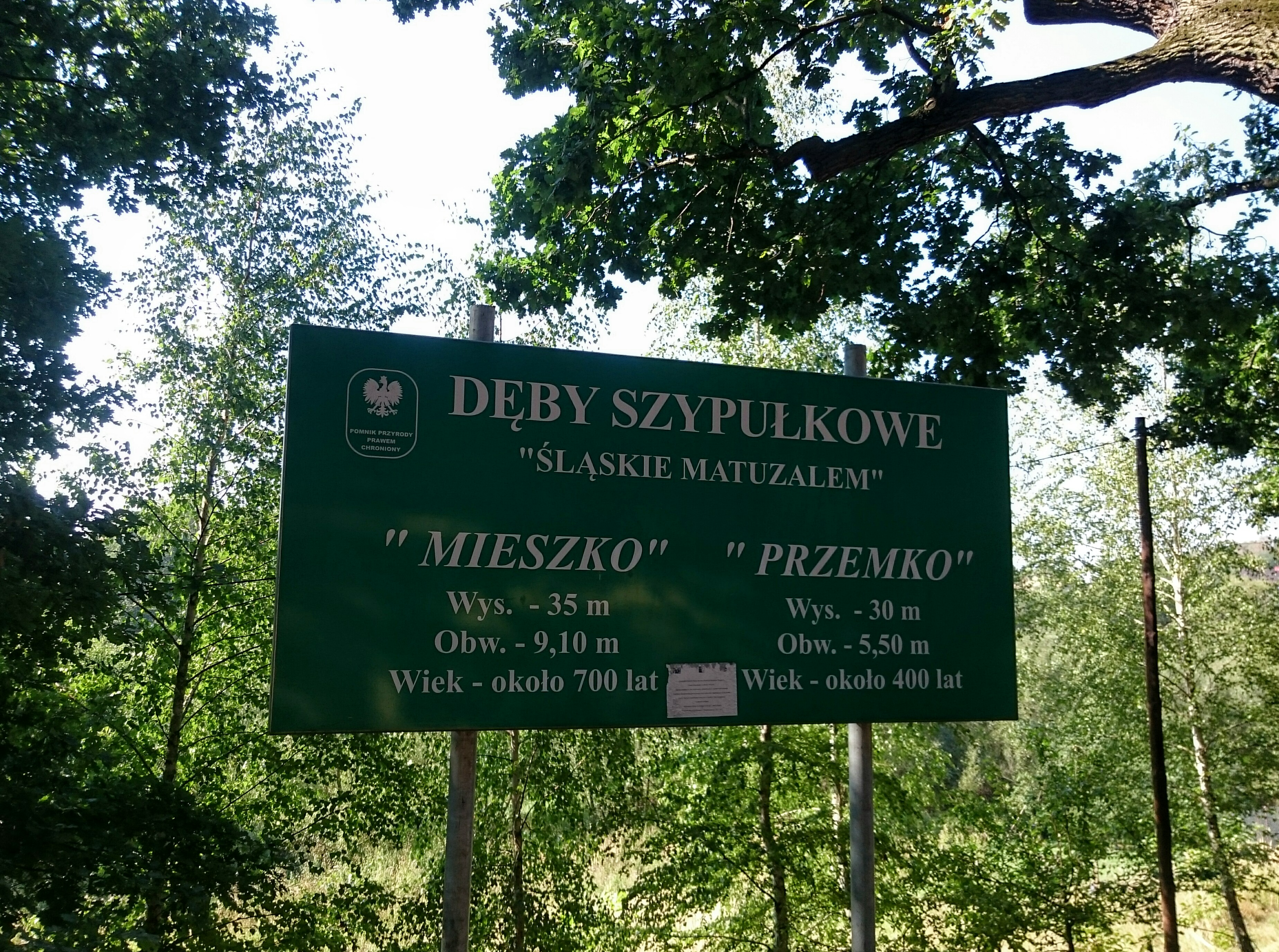
Information board next to the oaks

In 2011, members of the Cieszyn branch of the Polish Tourist and Sightseeing Society initiated efforts to protect the trees by erecting fences and an informational plaque. These efforts were realized on 30 October 2013, as part of the project "Revitalization and Promotion of Natural Monuments in Gmina Hażlach". Both Mieszko and Przemko are now fenced off, with an informational plaque describing the trees as "Silesian Methuselahs" and a wooden table for visitors nearby. The site is accessible via a yellow cycling route connecting Kaczyce, Kończyce Wielkie, and Kończyce Małe.

== Bibliography ==
- Żukowski, Aleksander (2006). Sławne drzewa województwa śląskiego [Famous Trees of the Silesian Voivodeship] (in Polish). Katowice: VECTRA. ISBN 83-922220-2-4.
