= Zamarski =

- Village
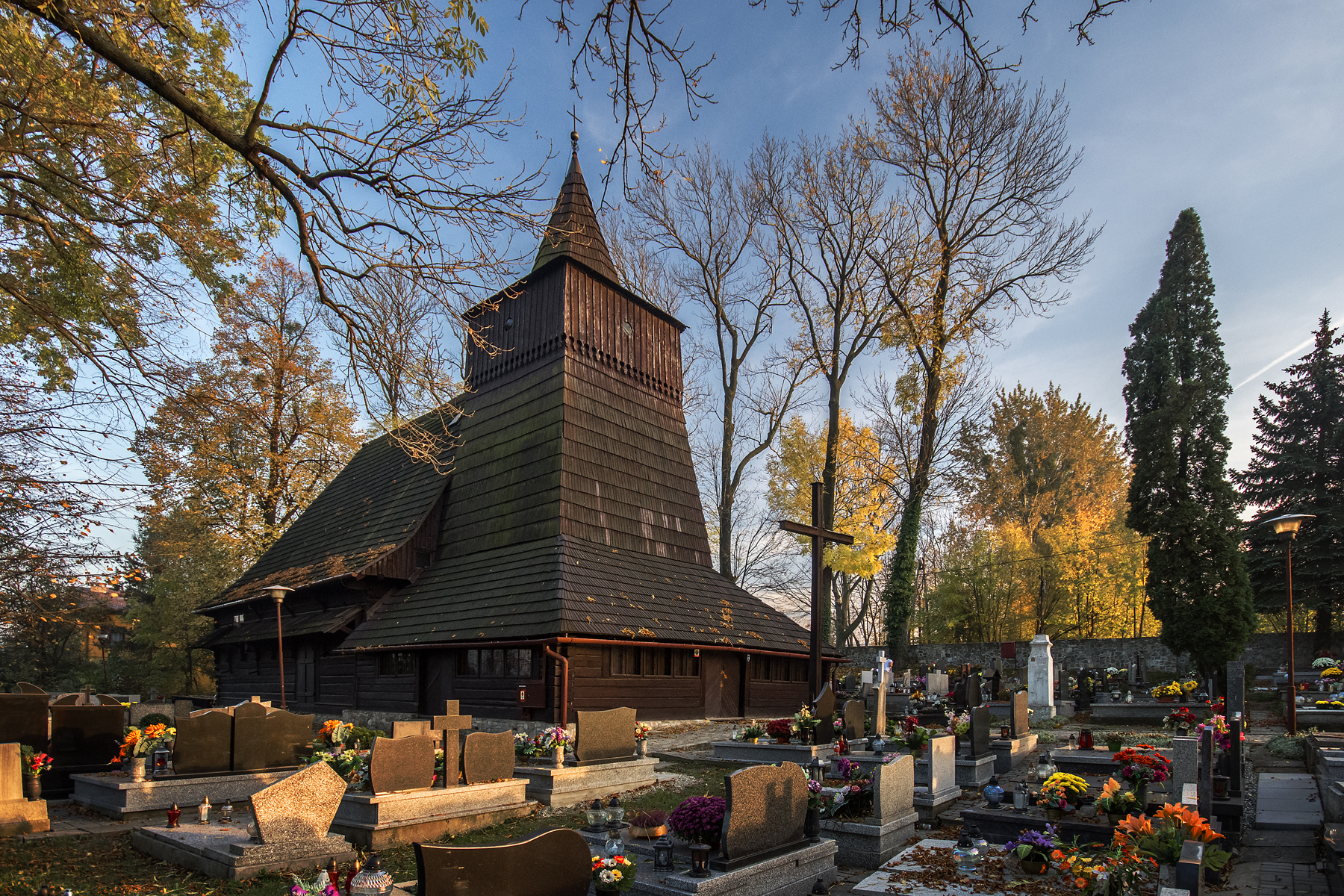
- Wooden Church of Saint Roch

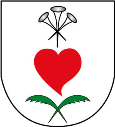
- Coat of arms

- Location within Poland
- Coordinates: 49°46′56.34″N 18°40′16.10″E
- Country: Poland
- Voivodeship: Silesian
- County: Cieszyn
- Gmina: Hażlach
- First mentioned: 1223

Government
  - Mayor: Klaudiusz Zawada

Area
  - Total: 8.64 km^{2} (3.34 sq mi)
- Elevation: 388 m (1,273 ft)

Population (2017)
  - Total: 1,382
  - Density: 160/km^{2} (414/sq mi)
- Time zone: UTC+1 (CET)
  - Summer (DST): UTC+2 (CEST)
- Postal code: 43-419
- Car plates: SCI

Zamarski is a village in Gmina Hażlach, Cieszyn County in Silesian Voivodeship, southern Poland.

== Etymology ==
The name is of topographic origin derived from Proto-Slavic words marsk, zmarsk (zamarsk).

== History ==
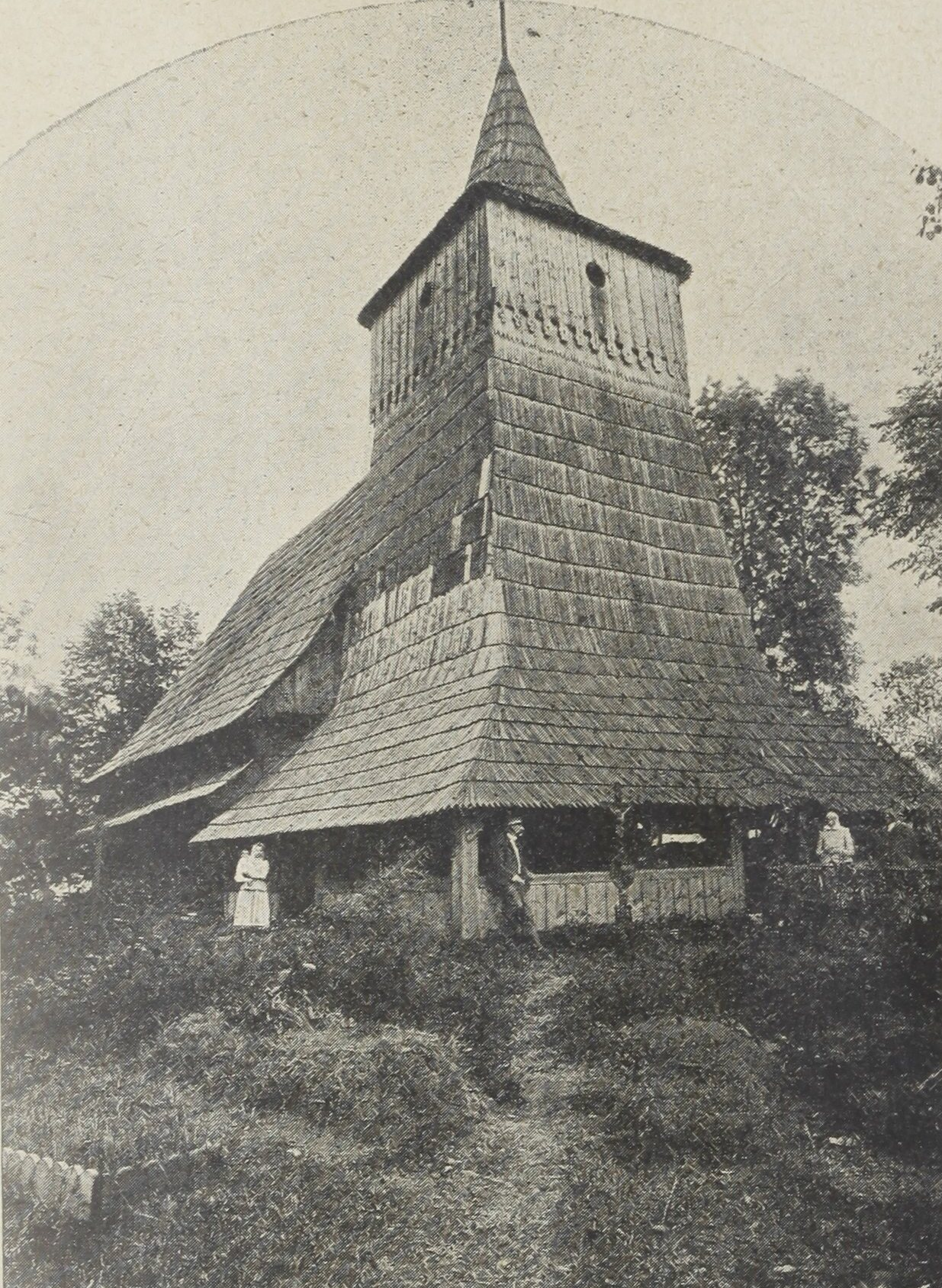
Saint Roch church before 1932

The village lies in the historical region of Cieszyn Silesia. It was first mentioned in a document of Bishop of Wrocław issued on 23 May 1223 for Norbertine Sisters in Rybnik among villages paying them a tithe, as Zamaischi.

Politically it belonged then to the Duchy of Opole and Racibórz and the Castellany of Cieszyn, which was in 1290 formed in the process of feudal fragmentation of Poland into the Duchy of Teschen, ruled by a local branch of Silesian Piast dynasty. In 1327 the duchy became a fee of the Kingdom of Bohemia, which after 1526 became a part of the Habsburg monarchy.

After the 1540s Protestant Reformation prevailed in the Duchy of Teschen and a local Catholic church (branch of Teschen parish) was taken over by Lutherans. It was taken from them (as one from around fifty buildings in the region) by a special commission and given back to the Roman Catholic Church on 18 April 1654.

After the Revolutions of 1848 in the Austrian Empire a modern municipal division was introduced in the re-established Austrian Silesia. The village as a municipality was subscribed to the political and legal district of Cieszyn. According to the censuses conducted in 1880, 1890, 1900 and 1910 the population of the municipality grew from 845 in 1880 to 858 in 1910 with the majority being native Polish-speakers (between 95.3% and 99.2%) accompanied by a small German-speaking minority (at most 40 or 4.7% in 1880 then dropping to between 0.8% and 1.5%). In terms of religion in 1910 the majority were Roman Catholics (55.1%), followed by Protestants (44.1%) and Jews (7 people). The village was also traditionally inhabited by Cieszyn Vlachs, speaking Cieszyn Silesian dialect.

After World War I, the fall of Austria-Hungary, the Polish–Czechoslovak War and the division of Cieszyn Silesia in 1920, it became a part of Poland. It was then annexed by Nazi Germany at the beginning of World War II. After the war it was restored to Poland.

== Geography ==
Zamarski lies in the southern part of Poland, north-east of the county seat, Cieszyn, 28 km (17 mi) west of Bielsko-Biała, 60 km (37 mi) south-west of the regional capital Katowice, and 5 km (3.1 mi) east of the border with the Czech Republic.

The village is situated on one of the hills of Silesian Foothills, at a height of 388 m (1,273 ft) above sea level, 12 km (7.5 mi) north-west of the Silesian Beskids. The hill, on which Zamarski lies, is the head waters of several streams, including Piotrówka, all of them in the waters of Olza, right tributary area of Odra;

== Landmarks ==
A wooden Saint Roch Catholic church of Saint Roch built in 1731.
