= Brzezówka, Silesian Voivodeship =

Brzezówka
- Village
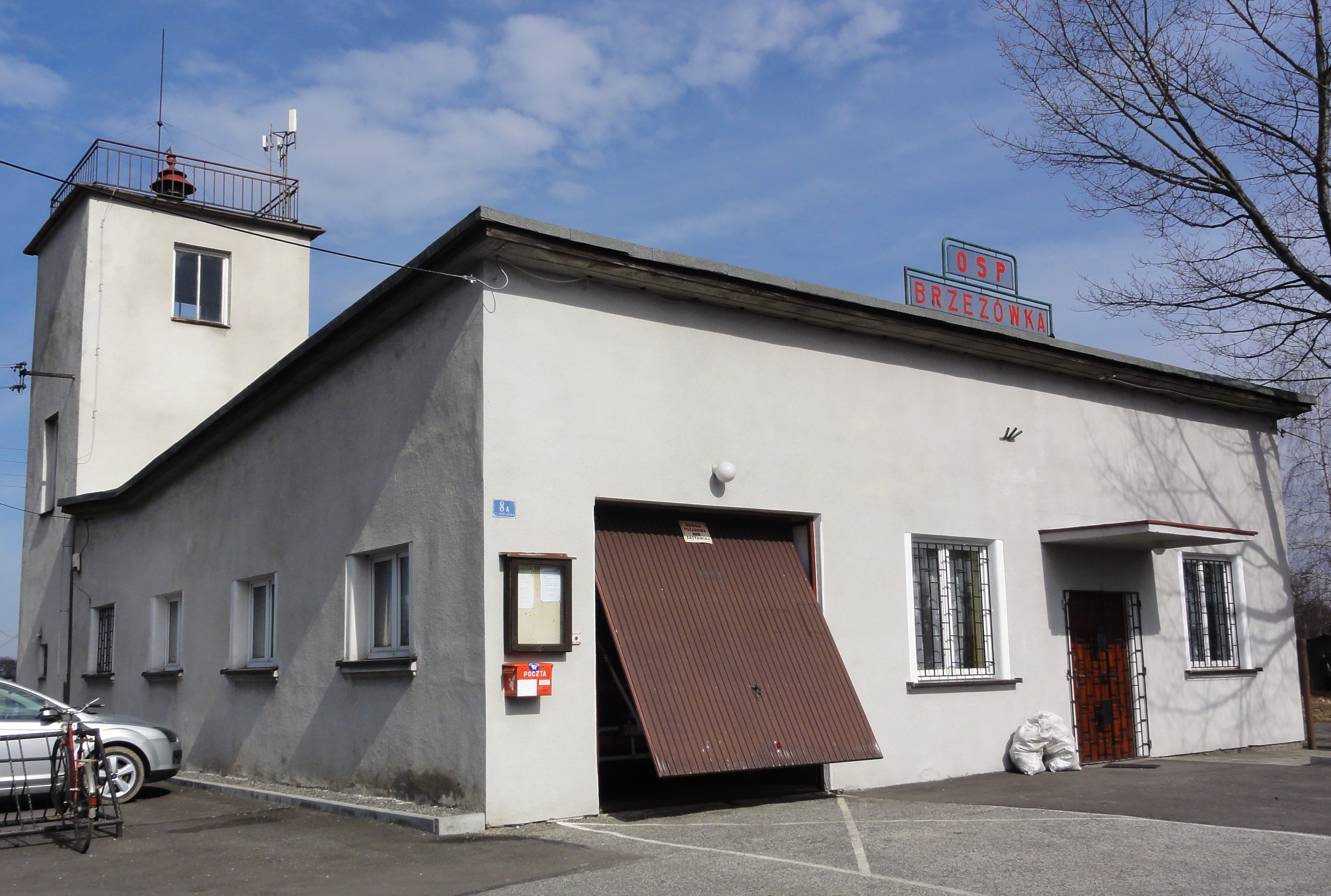
- Fire station

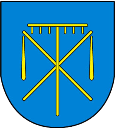
- Coat of arms

- Location within Poland
- Coordinates: 49°48′28.08″N 18°38′6.97″E
- Country: Poland
- Voivodeship: Silesian
- County: Cieszyn
- Gmina: Hażlach
- First mentioned: 1426

Government
  - Mayor: Leszek Banot

Area
  - Total: 4.60 km^{2} (1.78 sq mi)

Population (2017)
  - Total: 698
  - Density: 152/km^{2} (393/sq mi)
- Time zone: UTC+1 (CET)
  - Summer (DST): UTC+2 (CEST)
- Postal code: 43-419
- Car plates: SCI

Brzezówka [bʐɛˈzufka] is a village in Gmina Hażlach, Cieszyn County, Silesian Voivodeship, southern Poland, near the border with the Czech Republic.

== History ==
The village lies in the historical region of Cieszyn Silesia. It was first mentioned in 1426 as Brzesowicz. Later it was mentioned as Brzezowicz (1447, 1450) and since 1523 it appears under its current name (scribed as Brzezuwka, Brzesowka etc.). The name is derived from birches, (Polish: brzoza).

Politically the village belonged then to the Duchy of Teschen, a fee of the Kingdom of Bohemia, which after 1526 became a part of the Habsburg monarchy.

In 1612 Adam Wenceslaus, Duke of Cieszyn bestowed the village upon his hofmeister Margareth Kostlach (Polish: Małgorzata Kostlachówna), as a reward for her good service at the ducal court. The gift was also privileged, so that Margareth Kostlach could increase population of Brzezówka. Later also craftsmen settlement was allowed, which was extraordinary for a village as previously it was reserved for a ducal town of Cieszyn.

After the Revolutions of 1848 in the Austrian Empire a modern municipal division was introduced in the re-established Austrian Silesia. The village as a municipality was subscribed to the political and legal district of Cieszyn. According to the censuses conducted in 1880, 1890, 1900 and 1910 the population of the municipality grew from 300 in 1880 to 351 in 1910 with the majority being native Polish-speakers (between 99.7% and 100%). In terms of religion in 1910 majority were Roman Catholics (72.1%), followed by Protestants (27.9%). The village was also traditionally inhabited by Cieszyn Vlachs, speaking Cieszyn Silesian dialect.

After World War I, the fall of Austria-Hungary, the Polish–Czechoslovak War and the division of Cieszyn Silesia in 1920, it became a part of Poland. It was then annexed by Nazi Germany at the beginning of World War II. After the war it was restored to Poland.

== Geography ==
Brzezówka lies in the southern part of Poland, approximately 6 km (4 mi) north of the county seat, Cieszyn, 30 km (19 mi) west of Bielsko-Biała, 60 km (37 mi) south-west of the regional capital Katowice, and 2 km (1.2 mi) east of the border with the Czech Republic.

The village is situated on the geographical border between Silesian Foothills in the south and Ostrava Basin in the north, approximately 280 m (920 ft) above sea level, 16 km (9.9 mi) north-west of the Silesian Beskids. It is drained by several small streams, left tributaries of Piotrówka, in the watershed of Odra. ALthough the name of the village is derived from trees, nowadays it's almost completely deforested.
