= Zebrzydowice, Silesian Voivodeship =

Zebrzydowice
- Village
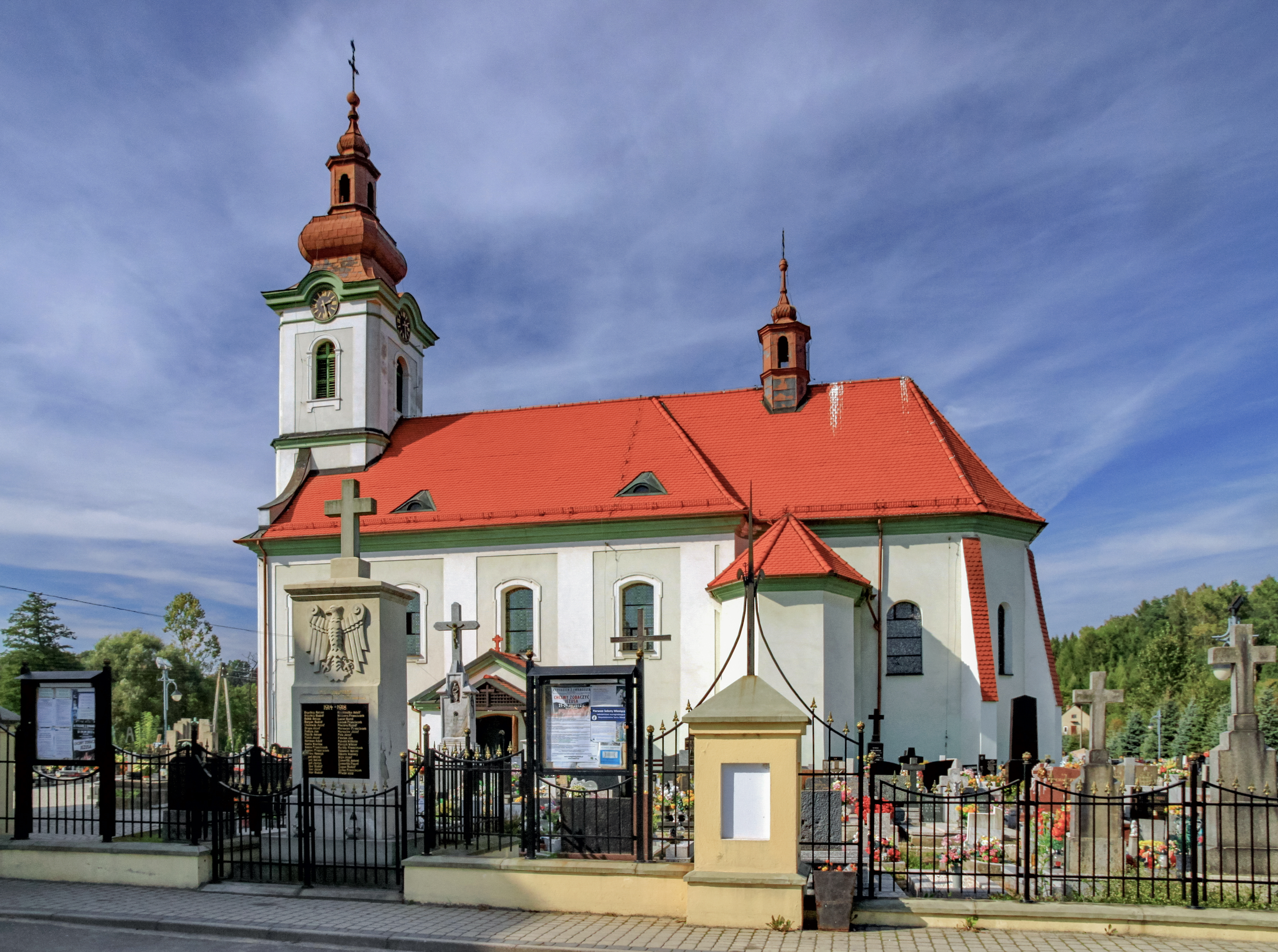
- Assumption of Mary Church

- Coat of arms

- Location within Silesian Voivodeship Location within Poland
- Coordinates: 49°52′31.43″N 18°37′3.90″E
- Country: Poland
- Voivodeship: Silesian
- County: Cieszyn
- Gmina: Zebrzydowice
- First mentioned: ca. 1305
- Population: 5,046
- Time zone: UTC+1 (CET)
  - Summer (DST): UTC+2 (CEST)
- Postal code: 43-410
- Car plates: SCI
- Website: http://www.zebrzydowice.pl

Zebrzydowice [zɛbʐɨdɔˈvit͡sɛ], (German: Seibersdorf) is a village and the seat of Gmina Zebrzydowice, Cieszyn County in Silesian Voivodeship, southern Poland, near the border with the Czech Republic. It lies in the historical region of Cieszyn Silesia, on the Piotrówka River. There is a rail border crossing in the village.

The name of the village is patronymic in origin, derived from personal name Zebrzyd (≤ German Sivrid/Siegfrid), ending alternately with typically Slavic -(ow)ice/(ow)itz or German -dorf meaning a village.

== History ==
The village was first mentioned in a Latin document of Diocese of Wrocław called Liber fundationis episcopatus Vratislaviensis from around 1305 as item in Siffridi villa debent esse quadraginta mansi. It meant that the village was supposed to pay tithe from 40 smaller lans. The creation of the village was a part of a larger settlement campaign taking place in the late 13th century on the territory of what will be later known as Upper Silesia.

Politically the village belonged initially to the Duchy of Teschen, formed in 1290 in the process of feudal fragmentation of Poland and was ruled by a local branch of Silesian Piast dynasty. In 1327 the duchy became a fee of the Kingdom of Bohemia, which after 1526 became a part of the Habsburg monarchy (Austria side after the compromise of 1867).

The village became a seat of a Catholic parish, first mentioned in an incomplete register of Peter's Pence payment from 1335 as villa Sifridi and as such being one of the oldest in the region. It was again mentioned in the register of Peter's Pence payment from 1447 among the 50 parishes of Teschen deanery as Seyfredsdorff. After the 1540s Protestant Reformation prevailed in the Duchy of Teschen and a local Catholic church was taken over by Lutherans. It was taken from them (as one from around fifty buildings in the region) by a special commission and given back to the Roman Catholic Church on 16 April 1654. The parish is now served by an Assumption of Mary Church.

As a private village it belonged to several noble families including Mattencloit and Larisch-Mönnich. After the Revolutions of 1848 in the Austrian Empire, a modern municipal division was introduced in the re-established Austrian Silesia. The village as a municipality was subscribed to political district and legal district of Freistadt. In 1855 it was crossed by Emperor Ferdinand Northern Railway. A post-office was opened in 1869.

According to the censuses conducted in 1880, 1890, 1900 and 1910 the population of the municipality grew from 1,688 in 1880 to 2,120 in 1910. In terms of the dominant language spoken colloquially the majority were Polish-speakers (growing from 92.3% in 1880 to 96.3% in 1910), accompanied by German-speakers (dropping from 128 or 7.7% in 1880 to 47 or 2.3% in 1910), and by Czech-speakers (growing from 17 or 1% in 1890 to 27 or 1.3% in 1910). In terms of religion, in 1910 the majority were Roman Catholics (98.3%), followed by Protestants (25 or 1.2%), Jews (10 or 0.4%) and 2 others. The village was also traditionally inhabited by Silesian Lachs, speaking Cieszyn Silesian dialect.

After World War I, the fall of Austria-Hungary, the Polish–Czechoslovak War and the division of Cieszyn Silesia in 1920, it became a part of Second Polish Republic and was transferred to Cieszyn County. It was then annexed by Nazi Germany at the beginning of World War II. After the war it was restored to Poland.
