= Hażlach =

- Village
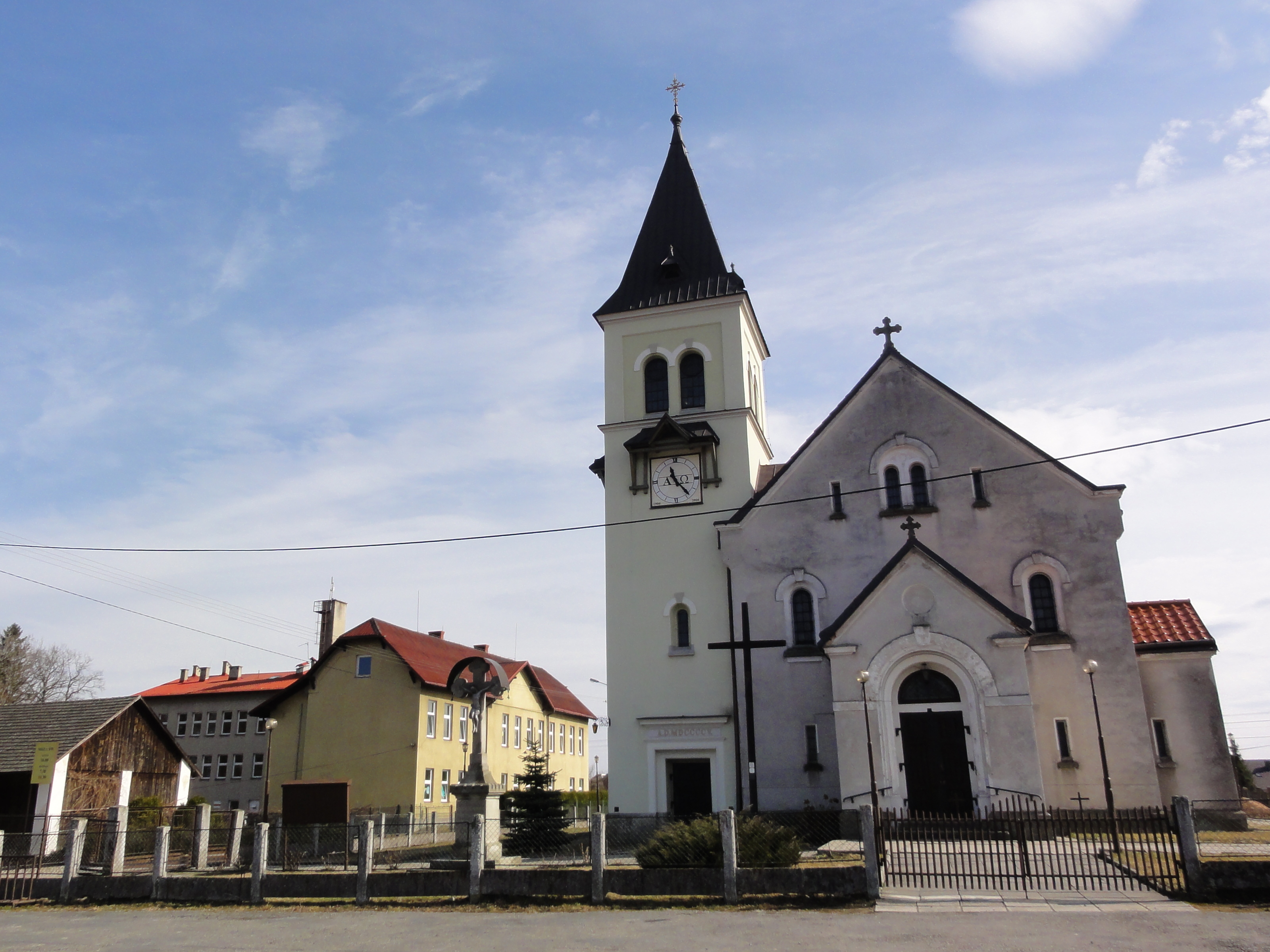
- Elementary school and Church of St. Bartholomew

- Coat of arms

- Location within Poland
- Coordinates: 49°48′14.25″N 18°39′49.82″E
- Country: Poland
- Voivodeship: Silesian
- County: Cieszyn
- Gmina: Hażlach
- First mentioned: 1305

Government
  - Mayor: Paweł Macura

Area
  - Total: 12.33 km^{2} (4.76 sq mi)

Population (2017)
  - Total: 2,460
  - Density: 200/km^{2} (517/sq mi)
- Time zone: UTC+1 (CET)
  - Summer (DST): UTC+2 (CEST)
- Postal code: 43-419
- Car plates: SCI
- Website: http://www.hazlach.pl

Hażlach [ˈxaʐlax] is a village and the seat of Gmina Hażlach in Cieszyn County in Silesian Voivodeship, southern Poland.

The name of the village is of topographic Austro-Bavarian origins (Hasen-loch?).

== History ==
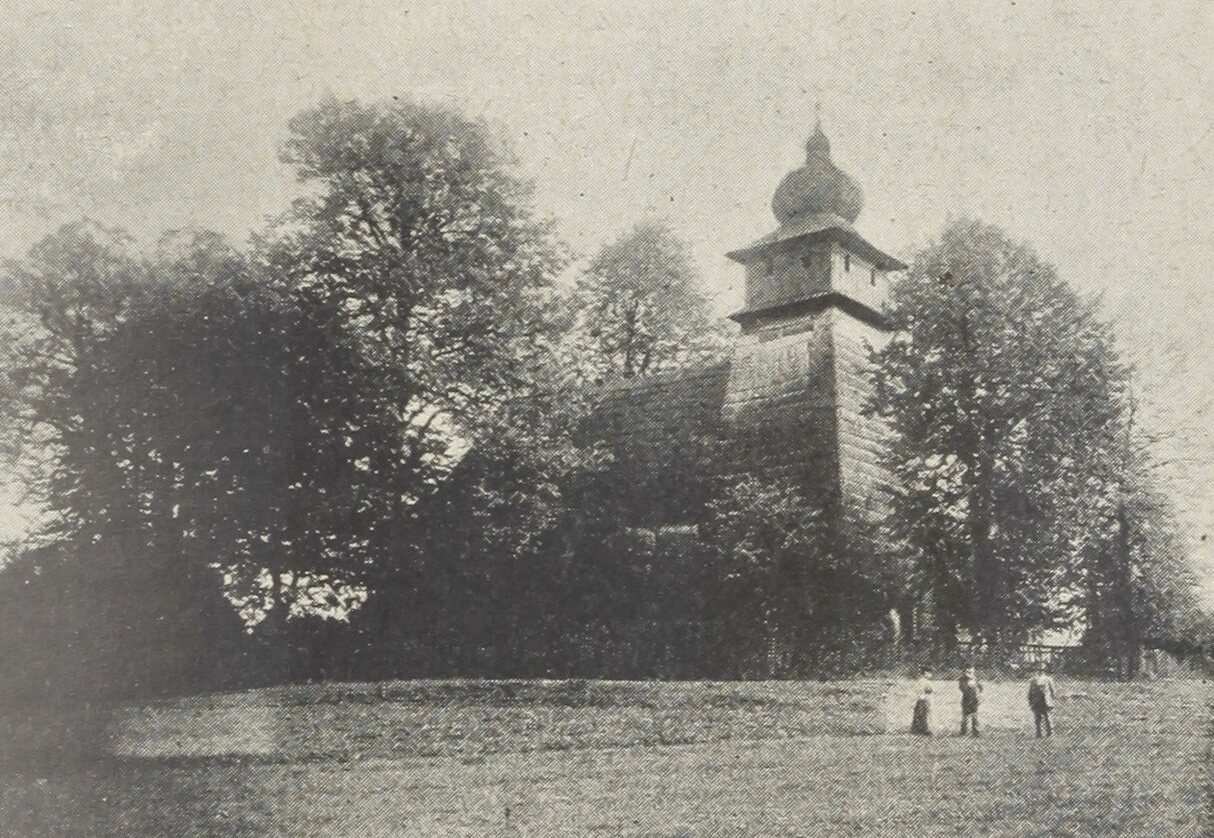
Former church before 1932

The village lies in the historical region of Cieszyn Silesia. It was first mentioned in a Latin document of Diocese of Wrocław called Liber fundationis episcopatus Vratislaviensis from around 1305 as item in Hesleth debent esse viginti mansi.. It meant that the village was supposed to pay a tithe from 20 smaller lans. The creation of the village was a part of a larger settlement campaign taking place in the late 13th century on the territory of what would later be known as Upper Silesia. The name of the village, of Austro-Bavarian origin, may indicate that the initial settlers were ethnic Germans, later fully polonised.

Politically the village belonged initially to the Duchy of Teschen, formed in 1290 in the process of feudal fragmentation of Poland and was ruled by a local branch of the Silesian Piast dynasty. In 1327 the duchy became a fee of the Kingdom of Bohemia, which after 1526 became a part of the Habsburg monarchy.

The village became a seat of a Catholic parish, mentioned in the register of Peter's Pence payment from 1447 among the 50 parishes of Teschen deanery as Hazelach.

After the 1540s Protestant Reformation prevailed in the Duchy of Teschen and a local Catholic church was taken over by Lutherans. It was taken from them (as one from around fifty buildings) in the region by a special commission and given back to the Roman Catholic Church on 18 April 1654.

After the Revolutions of 1848 in the Austrian Empire a modern municipal division was introduced in the re-established Austrian Silesia. The village as a municipality was subscribed to the political and legal district of Cieszyn. According to the censuses conducted in 1880, 1890, 1900 and 1910 the population of the municipality grew from 1,248 in 1880 to 1,342 in 1910 with the growing majority being native Polish-speakers (from 95.6% in 1880 to 99.3% in 1910) accompanied by a dwindling German-speaking minority (from 54 or 4.4% in 1880 to 8 or 0.6% in 1910). In terms of religion in 1910 majority were Roman Catholics (62.6%), followed by Protestants (36.8%) and 8 Jews. The village was also traditionally inhabited by Cieszyn Vlachs, speaking Cieszyn Silesian dialect.

After World War I, the fall of Austria-Hungary, the Polish–Czechoslovak War and the division of Cieszyn Silesia in 1920, it became a part of Poland. It was then annexed by Nazi Germany at the beginning of World War II. After the war it was restored to Poland.

== Geography ==
Hażlach lies in the southern part of Poland, 6 km (4 mi) north-east of the county seat, Cieszyn, 28 km (17 mi) west of Bielsko-Biała, 60 km (37 mi) south-west of the regional capital Katowice, and 5 km (3.1 mi) east of the border with the Czech Republic.

The village is situated on the geographical border between Silesian Foothills in the south and Ostrava Basin in the north, between roughly 270–330 m (890–1,080 ft) above sea level, 15 km (9.3 mi) north-west of the Silesian Beskids. Piotrówka, right tributary of the Olza in the watershed of Odra, flows through the village.
