= Pogwizdów, Silesian Voivodeship =

Pogwizdów
- Village
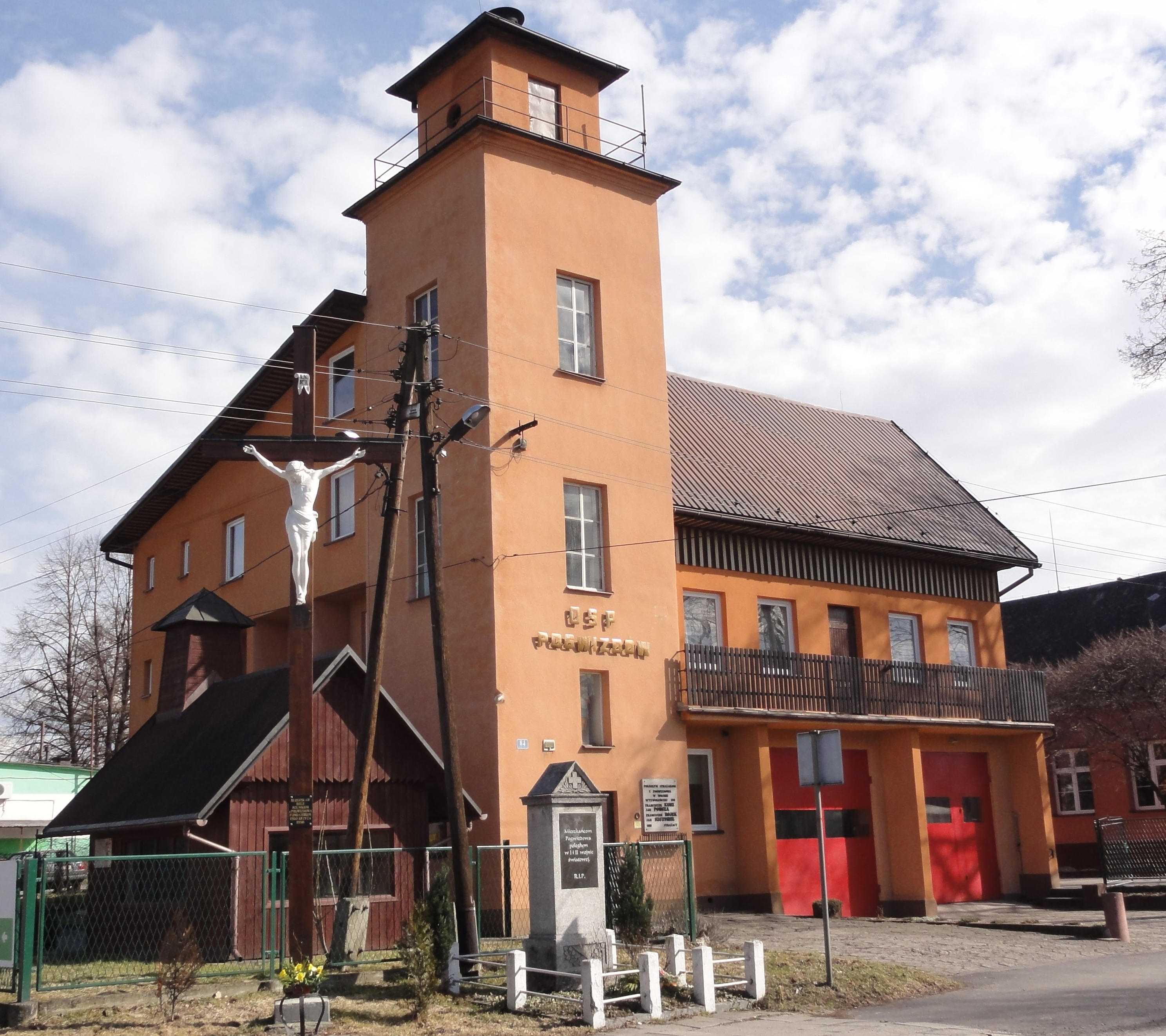
- Cross, monument and fire station in village's centre

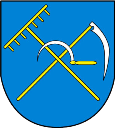
- Coat of arms

- Location within Poland
- Coordinates: 49°48′15.70″N 18°36′5.47″E
- Country: Poland
- Voivodeship: Silesian
- County: Cieszyn
- Gmina: Hażlach
- First mentioned: 1447

Government
  - Mayor: Aleksander Matysiak

Area
  - Total: 4.72 km^{2} (1.82 sq mi)

Population (2017)
  - Total: 3,571
  - Density: 757/km^{2} (1,960/sq mi)
- Time zone: UTC+1 (CET)
  - Summer (DST): UTC+2 (CEST)
- Postal code: 43-418
- Car plates: SCI

Pogwizdów [pɔɡˈvizduf] is a village in Gmina Hażlach, Cieszyn County in Silesian Voivodeship, southern Poland, on the border with the Czech Republic, on the Olza River.

== Etymology ==
The name is probably of possessive origin derived from personal name Pogwizd (such a name was recorded in a local document from 1504), but it is also possible that the name is cultural meaning a place where a wind whistles (Polish whistle is gwizdać).

== History ==
The village lies in the historical region of Cieszyn Silesia. It was first mentioned in a written document in 1447 as Pogwyzdow. Politically it belonged then to the Duchy of Teschen, a fee of the Kingdom of Bohemia, which after 1526 became a part of the Habsburg monarchy.

The first wooden church in the village was built in 1722. New church was built in 1817 and then renovated in 1860. During so-called "hungry years" of 1848–1849, only two families are reported to survive the hunger.

After the Revolutions of 1848 in the Austrian Empire a modern municipal division was introduced in the re-established Austrian Silesia. The village as a municipality was subscribed to the political and legal district of Cieszyn. According to the censuses conducted in 1880, 1890, 1900 and 1910 the population of the municipality grew from 546 in 1880 to 781 in 1910 with the majority being native Polish-speakers (between 96.7% and 98.6%) accompanied by a small German-speaking minority (at most 17 or 3.1% in 1880) and a few Czech-speaking people (at most 3 or 0.3% in 1900). In terms of religion in 1910 the majority were Roman Catholics (76.4%), followed by Protestants (22%) and Jews (11 or 1.6%). The village was also traditionally inhabited by Cieszyn Vlachs, speaking Cieszyn Silesian dialect.

After World War I, the fall of Austria-Hungary, the Polish–Czechoslovak War and the division of Cieszyn Silesia in 1920, it became a part of Poland. It was then annexed by Nazi Germany at the beginning of World War II. After the war it was restored to Poland.

There was a border crossing on the Olza River in the village in the past.

== Geography ==
Pogwizdów lies in the southern part of Poland, north of the county seat, Cieszyn, 32 km (20 mi) west of Bielsko-Biała, 60 km (37 mi) south-west of the regional capital Katowice, and on the right bank of the Olza (a right tributary of Odra), which constitutes here the border with the Czech Republic. The village is situated in Ostrava Basin, between 240–283 m (787–928 ft) above sea level, 18 km (11 mi) north-west of the Silesian Beskids.
