= Gmina Zebrzydowice =

Gmina Zebrzydowice Zebrzydowice Commune
- Gmina
- Coat of arms

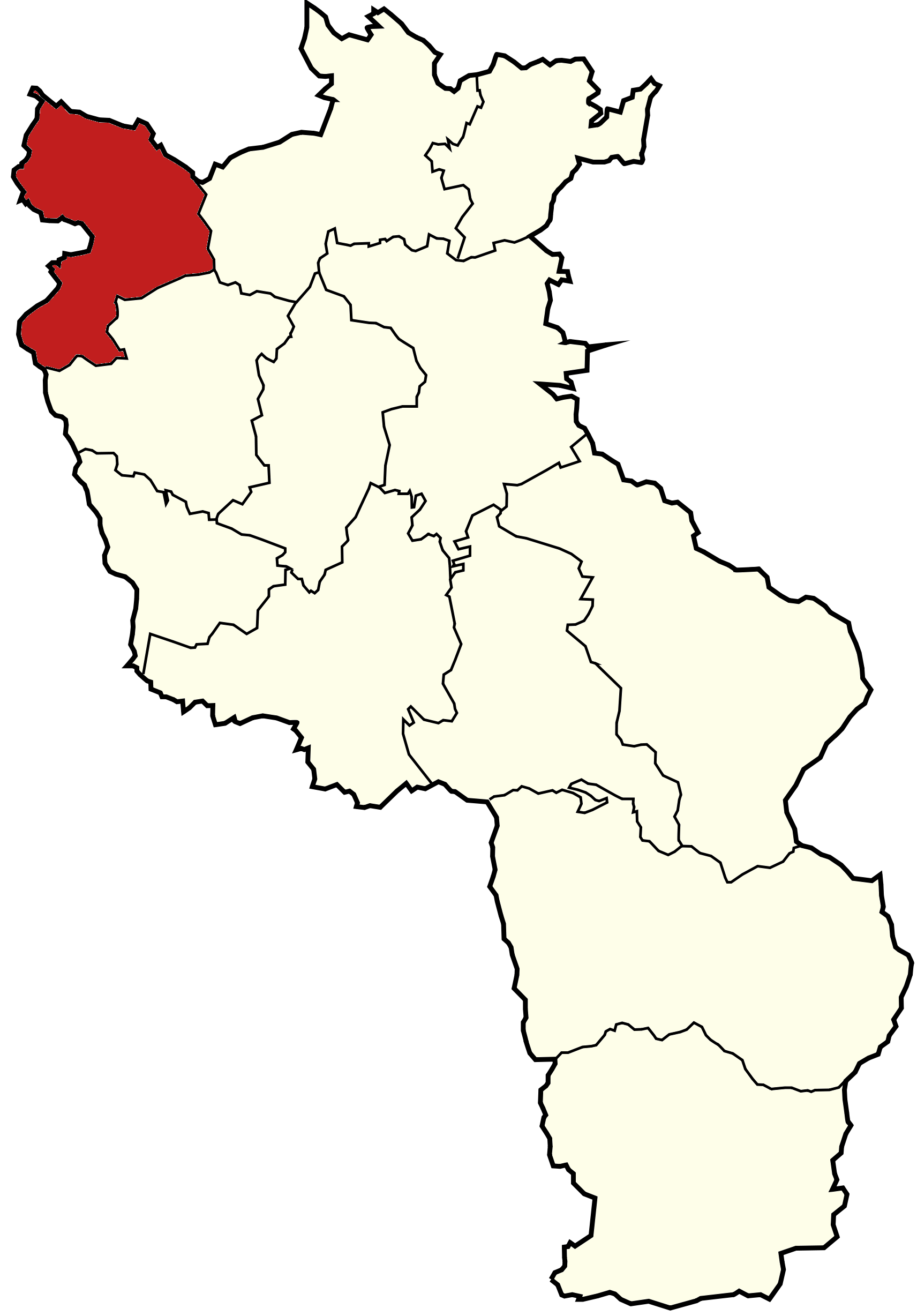
- Gmina Zebrzydowice within the Cieszyn County
- Coordinates (Zebrzydowice): 49°52′31″N 18°37′4″E
- Country: Poland
- Voivodeship: Silesian
- County: Cieszyn
- Seat: Zebrzydowice

Government
  - Mayor: Andrzej Marian Kondziołka

Area
  - Total: 41.68 km^{2} (16.09 sq mi)

Population (2019-06-30)
  - Total: 13,240
  - Density: 317.7/km^{2} (822.7/sq mi)
- Website: https://www.zebrzydowice.pl/

Gmina Zebrzydowice is a rural gmina (administrative district) in Cieszyn County, Silesian Voivodeship, southern Poland. It lies in the historical region of Cieszyn Silesia, with its seat as the village of Zebrzydowice.

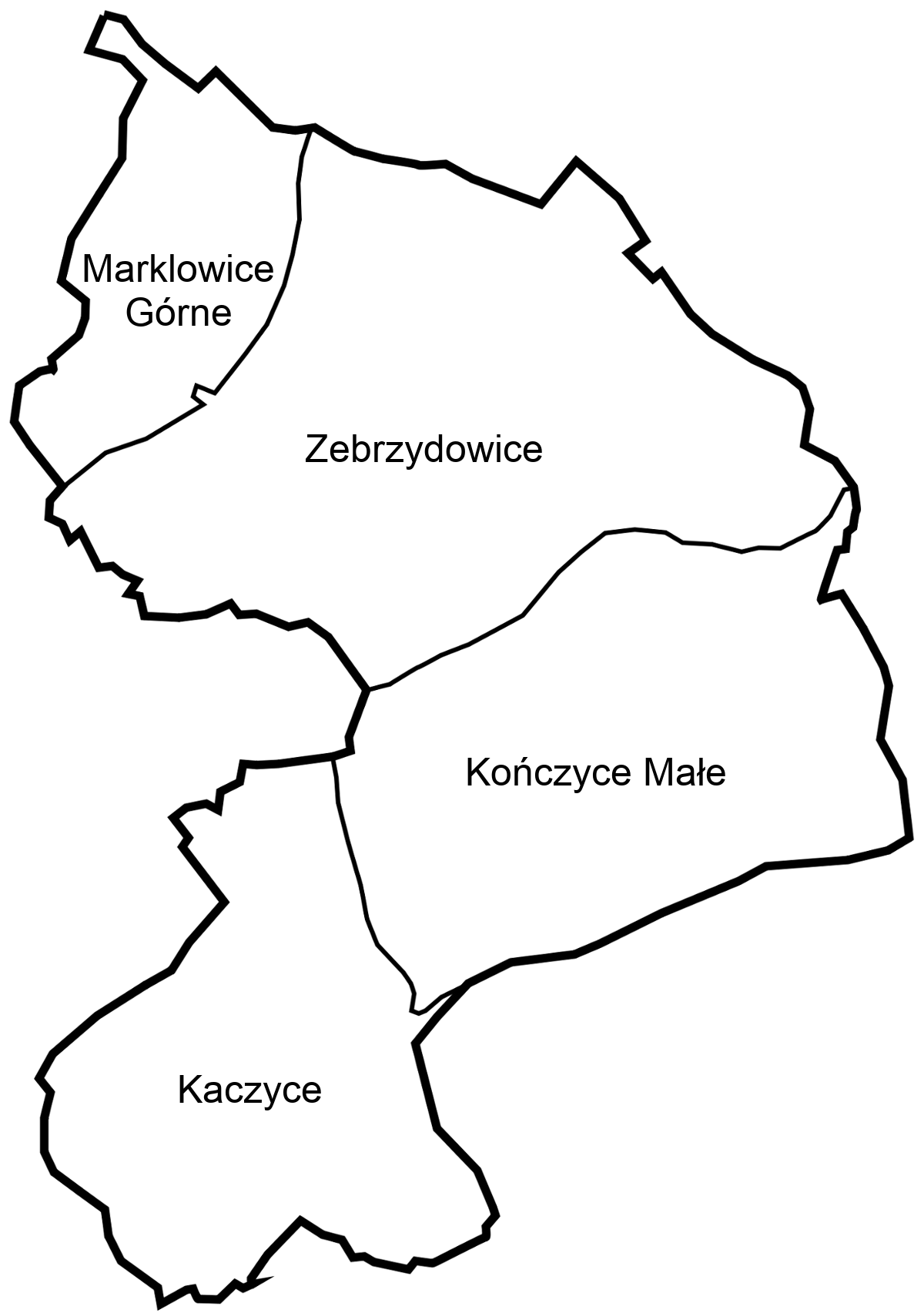
Division of the gmina

The gmina covers an area of 41.68 square kilometres (16.1 sq mi), and as of 2019 its total population is 13,240.

== Villages ==
Gmina Zebrzydowice contains the villages and settlements of Zebrzydowice, Kaczyce, Kończyce Małe and Marklowice Górne.

== Neighbouring gminas ==
Gmina Zebrzydowice is bordered by the gminas of Hażlach, Jastrzębie-Zdrój, Pawłowice, and Strumień. It also borders the Czech Republic.

== Twin towns – sister cities ==
Gmina Zebrzydowice is twinned with:

- Petrovice u Karviné, Czech Republic
