= Kaczyce, Silesian Voivodeship =

Kaczyce
- Village
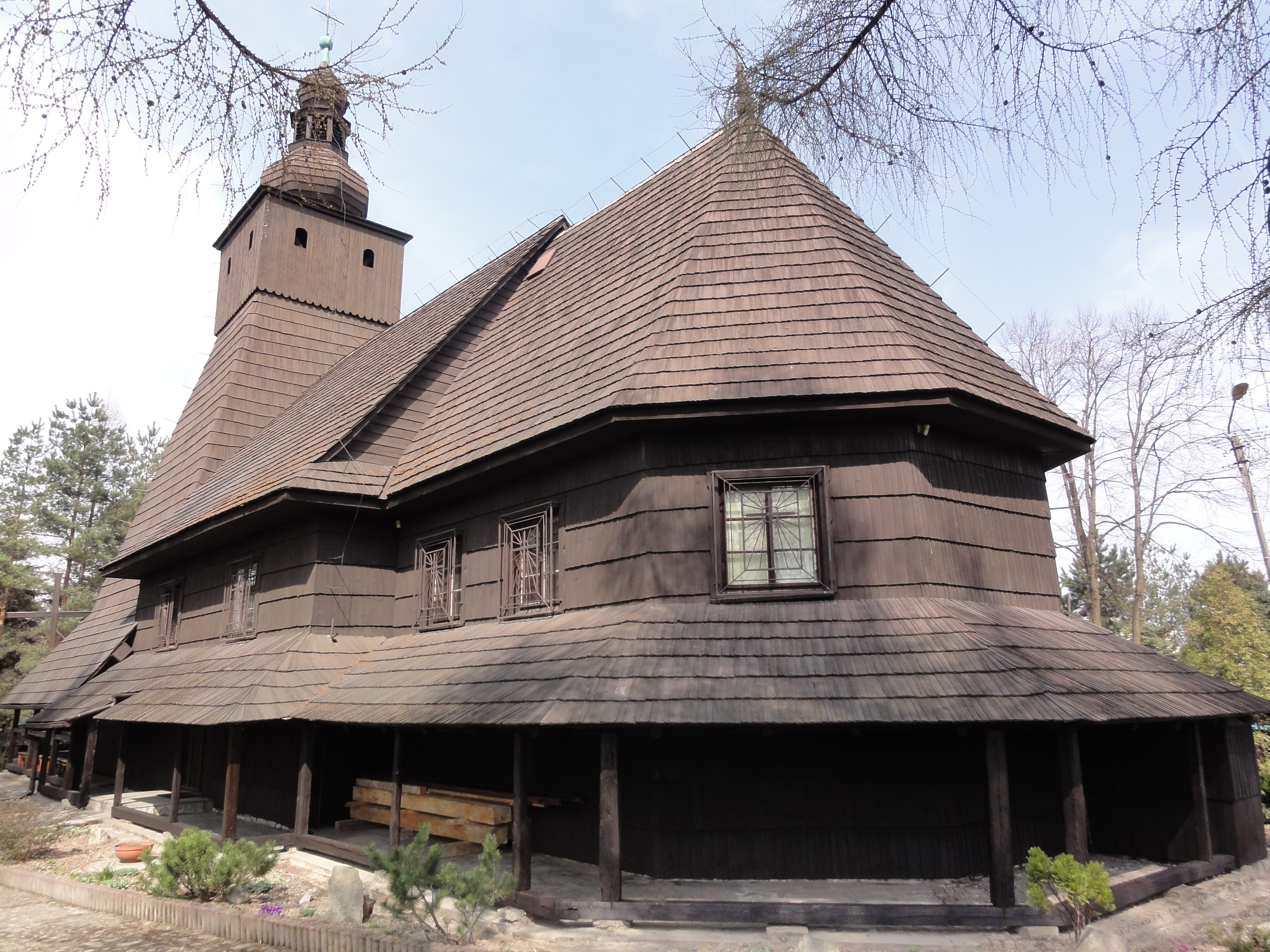
- Exaltation of the Cross wooden church

- Location within Poland
- Coordinates: 49°50′03.50″N 18°35′30.30″E
- Country: Poland
- Voivodeship: Silesian
- County: Cieszyn
- Gmina: Zebrzydowice
- First mentioned: 1332

Government
  - Mayor: Marcin Stryczek

Area
  - Total: 9.27 km^{2} (3.58 sq mi)

Population (2004)
  - Total: 3,008
  - Density: 324/km^{2} (840/sq mi)
- Time zone: UTC+1 (CET)
  - Summer (DST): UTC+2 (CEST)
- Postal code: 43-417
- Car plates: SCI
- Website: http://www.kaczyce.net/

Kaczyce is a village in Gmina Zebrzydowice, Cieszyn County, Silesian Voivodeship, southern Poland, on the border with the Czech Republic. It lies in the historical region of Cieszyn Silesia, on the Olza River.

== History ==
The village was first mentioned in 1333 as Kaczyce(?). It was probably founded by a knight mentioned in 1297 as comite Wlodzimiro dicto Kacza. Later it was mentioned as Katschitz (1413), Kaczycz (1416), Kaczicze (1447), and in 1723 two parts of the village were mentioned as Nieder (Dolne, lit. Lower) and Ober Katschütz (Górne, lit. Upper).

Politically the village belonged initially to the Duchy of Teschen, formed in 1290 in the process of feudal fragmentation of Poland and was ruled by a local branch of Piast dynasty. In 1327 the duchy became a fee of the Kingdom of Bohemia, which after 1526 became part of the Habsburg monarchy.

Since 1770 it was owned successively by the Spens family, baron Beess and, from the middle of the 19th century, by count Larisch.

After Revolutions of 1848 in the Austrian Empire a modern municipal division was introduced in the re-established Austrian Silesia. The village as a municipality was subscribed at first to the political district of Teschen and the legal district of Freistadt, which in 1868 became an independent political district. According to the censuses conducted in 1880, 1890, 1900 and 1910 the population of the municipality grew from 1,098 in 1880 to 1,170 in 1910 with a majority being native Polish-speakers (between 97.7% and 99.7%) accompanied by German-speaking (at most 20 or 2.1% in 1890) and by Czech-speaking people (at most 7 or 0.7% in 1900). In terms of religion in 1910 the majority were Roman Catholics (99.6%), followed by Protestants (5 or 0.4%).

After World War I, fall of Austria-Hungary, Polish–Czechoslovak War and the division of Cieszyn Silesia in 1920, it became a part of Second Polish Republic and was transferred to Cieszyn County. It was then annexed by Nazi Germany at the beginning of World War II. After the war it was restored to Poland.

There is a wooden church dating from 1620 in the village, relocated here from Ruptawa near Jastrzębie-Zdrój in 1971–1972. The Morcinek coal mine (named after writer Gustaw Morcinek) in the village was closed in 1997 after short activity.
