= Rudnik, Cieszyn County =

Rudnik
- Village
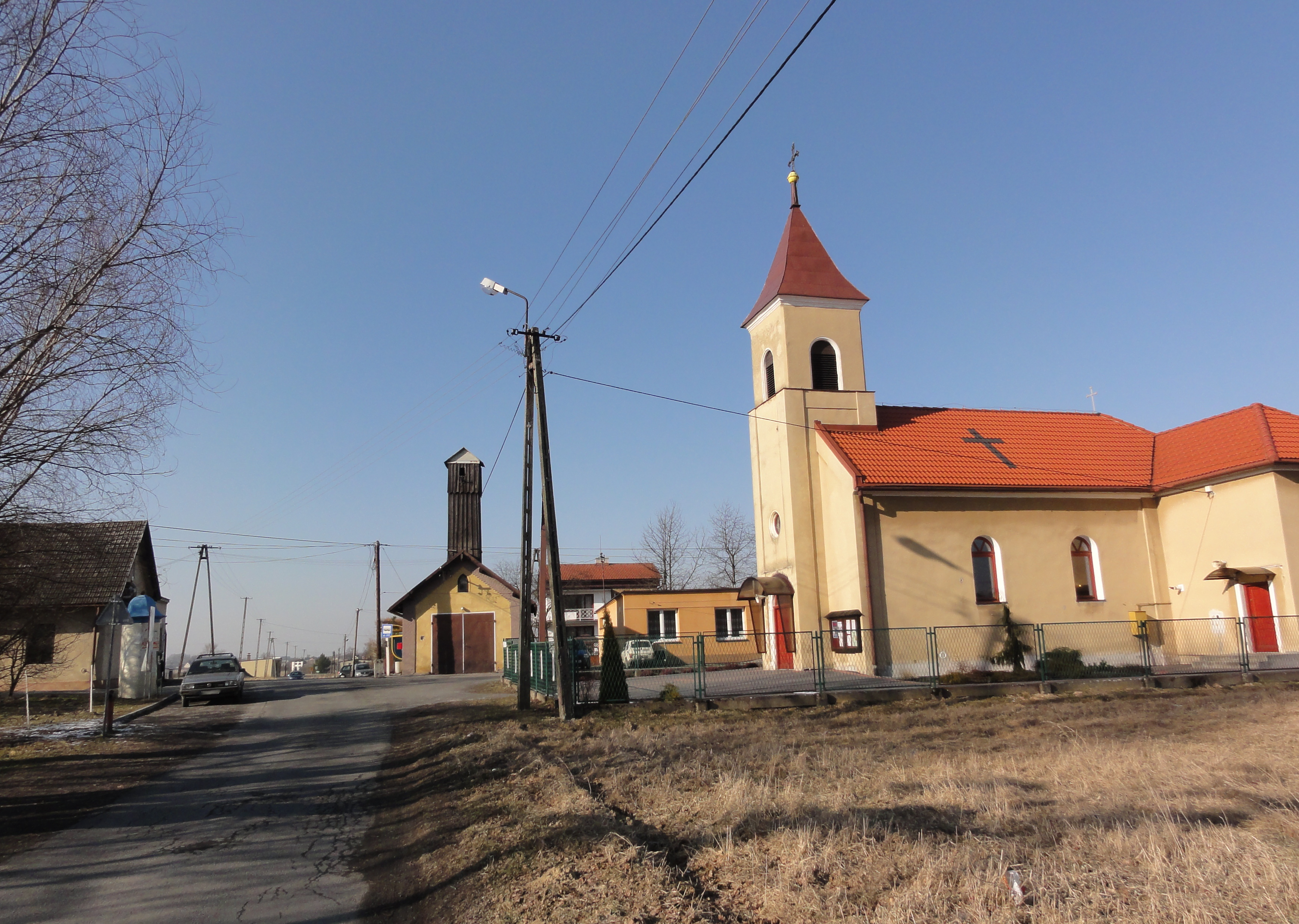
- Village centre

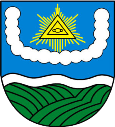
- Coat of arms

- Location within Poland
- Coordinates: 49°51′4.1″N 18°40′34.42″E
- Country: Poland
- Voivodeship: Silesian
- County: Cieszyn
- Gmina: Hażlach
- First mentioned: 1523

Government
  - Mayor: Zdzisław Jarosz

Area
  - Total: 4.105 km^{2} (1.585 sq mi)

Population (2017)
  - Total: 479
  - Density: 117/km^{2} (302/sq mi)
- Time zone: UTC+1 (CET)
  - Summer (DST): UTC+2 (CEST)
- Postal code: 43-419
- Car plates: SCI

Rudnik (Polish pronunciation: [ˈrudɲik]) is a village in Gmina Hażlach, Cieszyn County, Silesian Voivodeship, southern Poland.

The name of the village is derived from a name of a local stream Rudnik, mentioned as early as 1442 (do potoka jmenem Rudnika), which is a transformation of a word rudy, meaning rdzawy (rusty).

== History ==
The village lies in the historical region of Cieszyn Silesia. Until recently it was stated that the village was first mentioned in 1566 as Rudnik, however another document exists issued by Wenceslaus III Adam, Duke of Cieszyn on 5 November 1608 which retrospectively affirms another document from 1523 that mentioned the village among others obliged to consume ale produced only in Cieszyn. At that time the village belonged to the Duchy of Teschen, a fee of the Kingdom of Bohemia, which after 1526 became part of the Habsburg monarchy.

After World War I, the fall of Austria-Hungary, the Polish–Czechoslovak War and the division of Cieszyn Silesia in 1920, it became a part of Poland. It was then annexed by Nazi Germany at the beginning of World War II. After that war it was restored to Poland.

== Geography ==
Rudnik lies in south Poland, 11 km (7 mi) north-east of the county seat, Cieszyn, 25 km (16 mi) west of Bielsko-Biała, 55 km (34 mi) south-west of the regional capital Katowice, and 8 km (5.0 mi) east of the border with the Czech Republic.

The village is situated on the geographical border between Ostrava Basin in the east and Oświęcim Basin in the west, between roughly 260–280 m (850–920 ft) above sea level, 16 km (9.9 mi) north-west of the Silesian Beskids. It is drained by several streams, left tributaries of the Knajka, in the watershed of Vistula.
