= Kończyce Wielkie =

- Village
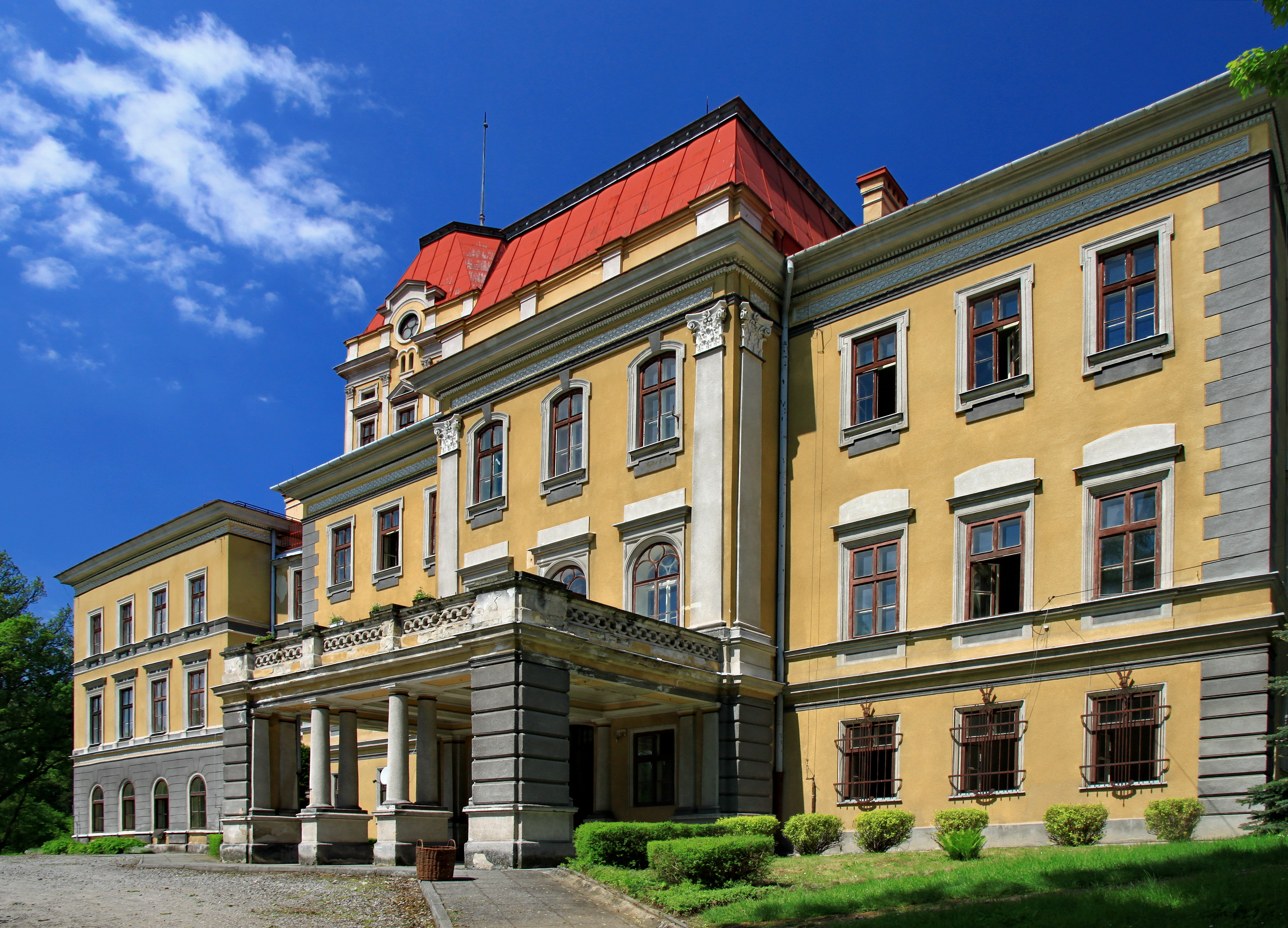
- Palace in Kończyce Wielkie

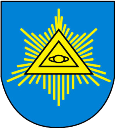
- Coat of arms

- Location within Poland
- Coordinates: 49°49′55.72″N 18°39′9.74″E
- Country: Poland
- Voivodeship: Silesian
- County: Cieszyn
- Gmina: Hażlach
- First mentioned: ca. 1305

Government
  - Mayor: Marian Morawiec

Area
  - Total: 14.45 km^{2} (5.58 sq mi)

Population (2017)
  - Total: 1,864
  - Density: 129.0/km^{2} (334.1/sq mi)
- Time zone: UTC+1 (CET)
  - Summer (DST): UTC+2 (CEST)
- Postal code: 43-419
- Car plates: SCI

Kończyce Wielkie is a village in Gmina Hażlach, Cieszyn County in Silesian Voivodeship, southern Poland, near the border with the Czech Republic.

== History ==
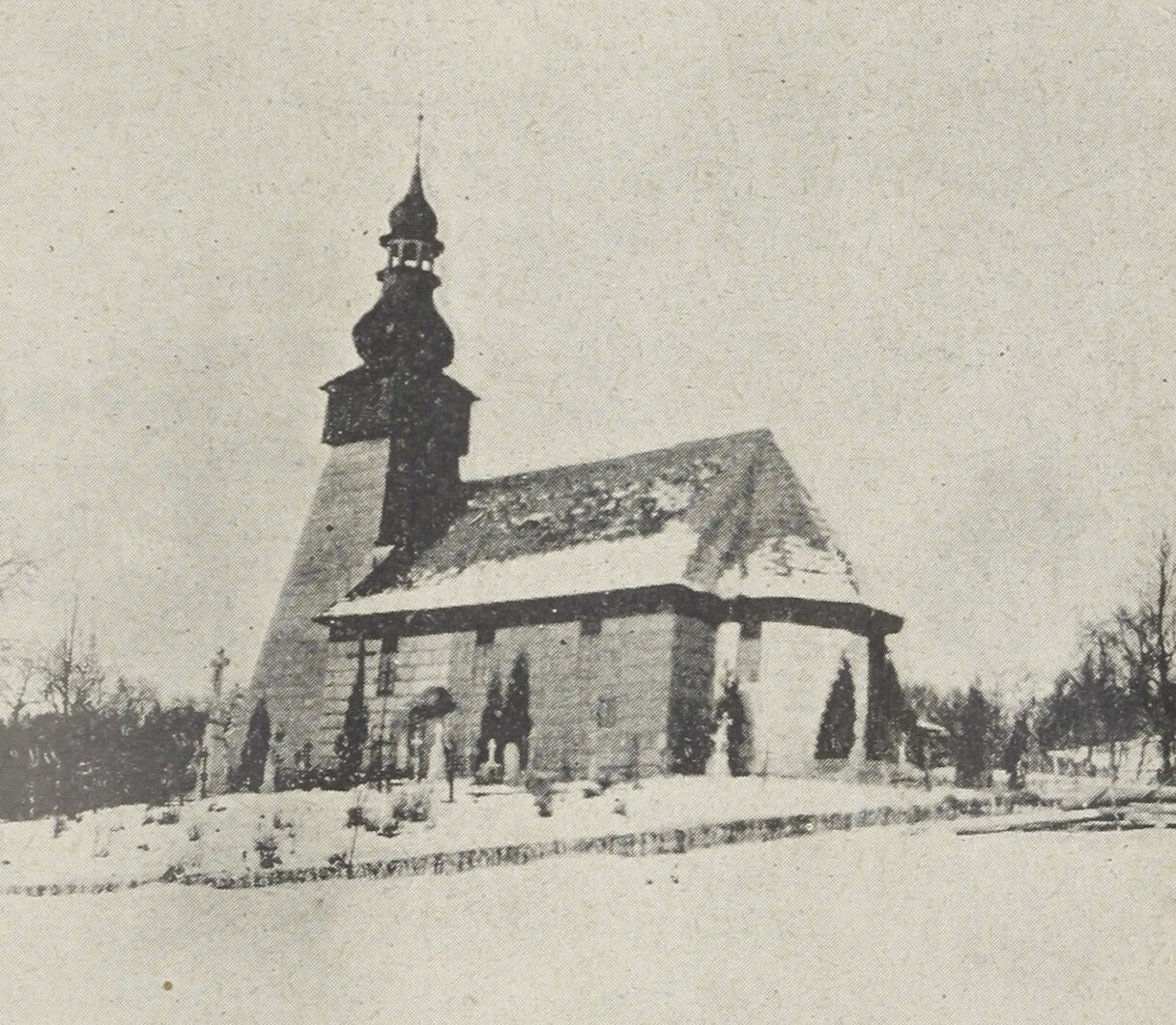
Saint Michael Archangel church, before 1932

In 2004 and 2005 in the village the oldest traces of Homo erectus in Poland were found, dated 800 000 years old.

The village in the historical region of Cieszyn Silesia. It was first mentioned in a Latin document of Diocese of Wrocław called Liber fundationis episcopatus Vratislaviensis from around 1305 as item in Cunczindorf Pasconis debent esse XXIX mansi. It meant that the village was supposed to pay a tithe from 29 greater lans, and also that it was a private village as opposed to the sister settlement of Cunczindorf principis mentioned in the same document, which was a ducal village. The dorf (German for a village) ending of its name indicates that the primordial settlers were of German origins. The creation of the village was a part of a larger settlement campaign taking place in the late 13th century on the territory of what would later be known as Upper Silesia.

Politically the village belonged initially to the Duchy of Teschen, formed in 1290 in the process of feudal fragmentation of Poland and was ruled by a local branch of Silesian Piast dynasty. In 1327 the duchy became a fee of the Kingdom of Bohemia, which after 1526 became a part of the Habsburg monarchy.

The village could have become a seat of a Catholic parish early after location as an incomplete register of Peter's Pence payment from 1335 mentioned Cunczendorf, however there were two other villages named the same in the Teschen deaconry. Another register of Peter's Pence payment from 1447 among the 50 parishes of Teschen deanery mentioned two villages called Cunczendorff. After the 1540s Protestant Reformation prevailed in the Duchy of Teschen and a local Catholic church was taken over by Lutherans. It was taken from them (as one from around fifty buildings) in the region by a special commission and given back to the Roman Catholic Church on 25 April 1654.

After the Revolutions of 1848 in the Austrian Empire a modern municipal division was introduced in the re-established Austrian Silesia. The village as a municipality was subscribed at first to the political district of Teschen and the legal district of Freistadt, which in 1868 became an independent political district. According to the censuses conducted in 1880, 1890, 1900 and 1910 the population of the municipality dropped from 1,677 in 1880 to 1,624 in 1910 with the majority being native Polish-speakers (between 97.4% and 98.5%) accompanied by German-speaking (at most 31 or 1.9% in 1910) and by Czech-speaking people (at most 18 or 1.1% in 1880). In terms of religion in 1910 the majority were Roman Catholics (99.7%).

After World War I, the fall of Austria-Hungary, the Polish–Czechoslovak War and the division of Cieszyn Silesia in 1920, it became a part of Second Polish Republic and was transferred to Cieszyn County. It was then annexed by Nazi Germany at the beginning of World War II. After the war it was restored to Poland.

== Geography ==
Kończyce Wielkie lies in the southern part of Poland, 10 km (6 mi) north of the county seat, Cieszyn, 28 km (17 mi) west of Bielsko-Biała, 55 km (34 mi) south-west of the regional capital Katowice, and 5 km (3.1 mi) east of the border with the Czech Republic.

The village is situated in Ostrava Basin, between roughly 250–294 m (820–965 ft) above sea level, 18 km (11 mi) north-west of the Silesian Beskids. Piotrówka, right tributary of the Olza in the watershed of Odra, flows through the village.

== Landmarks ==
There is a wooden Saint Michael the Archangel church built in 1777 in the village and a palace built by Jerzy Fryderyk Wilczek at the end of the 17th century. Last owner of the palace was countess Gabriela von Thun-Hohenstein. She was known in the region for her philanthropic activities, she helped poor children, worked in the Red Cross and in 1910 funded construction of a pavilion of Silesian Hospital in Cieszyn. She was then awarded an honorary citizen of that town. In 1945 Soviet troops entered the palace and devastated it. Aristocratic family was expropriated of their property and orphanage was set there. After the fall of communism in Poland, there were problems with the property laws for the palace. It has been finally sold in 2007 to businessmen who declared they would like to set up a hotel there.

== Gallery ==
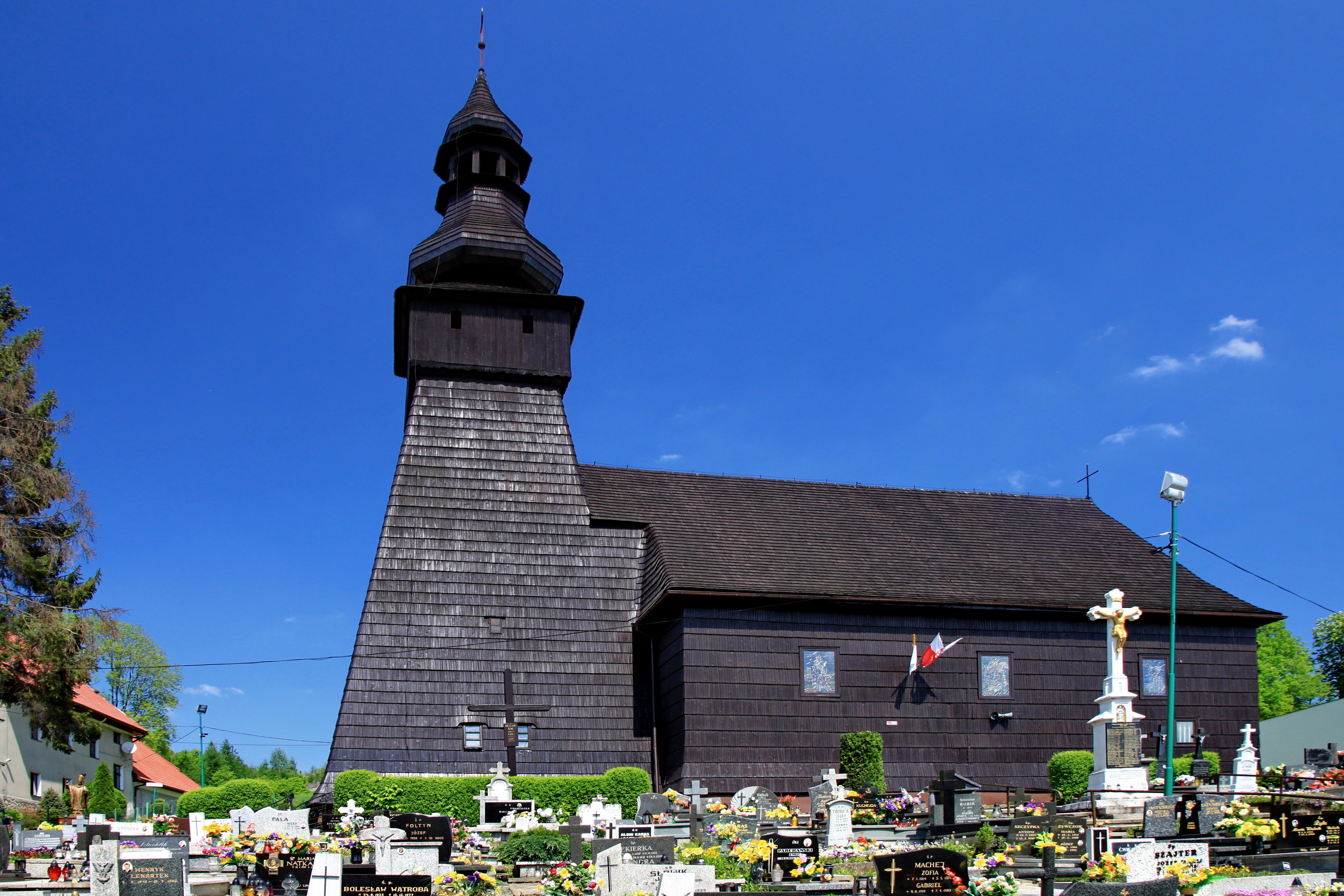
Saint Michael Archangel parish church

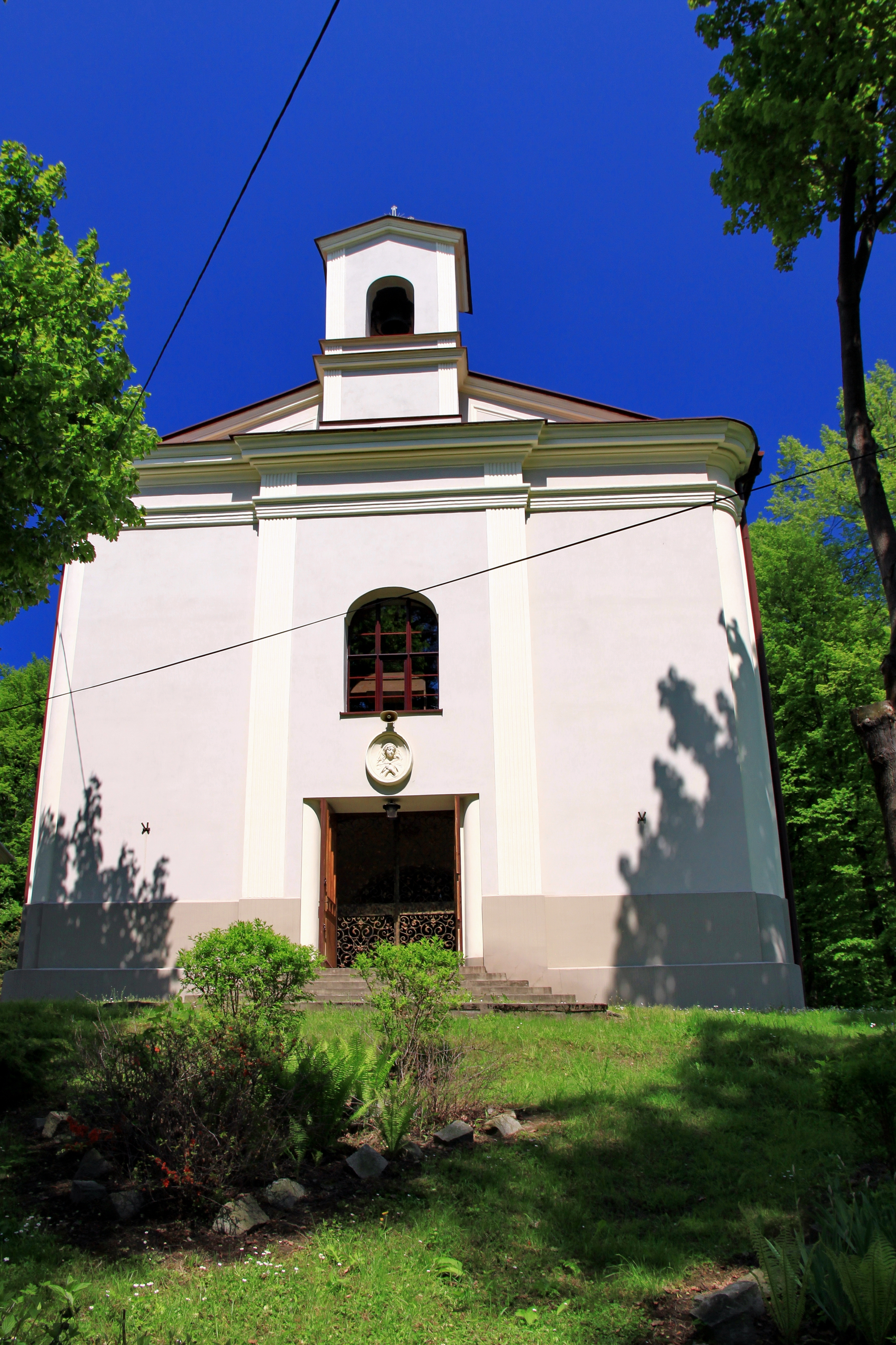
Chapel of the Providence of God

== See also ==
- Kończyce Małe
- Mieszko Oak
