= Kończyce Małe =

- Village
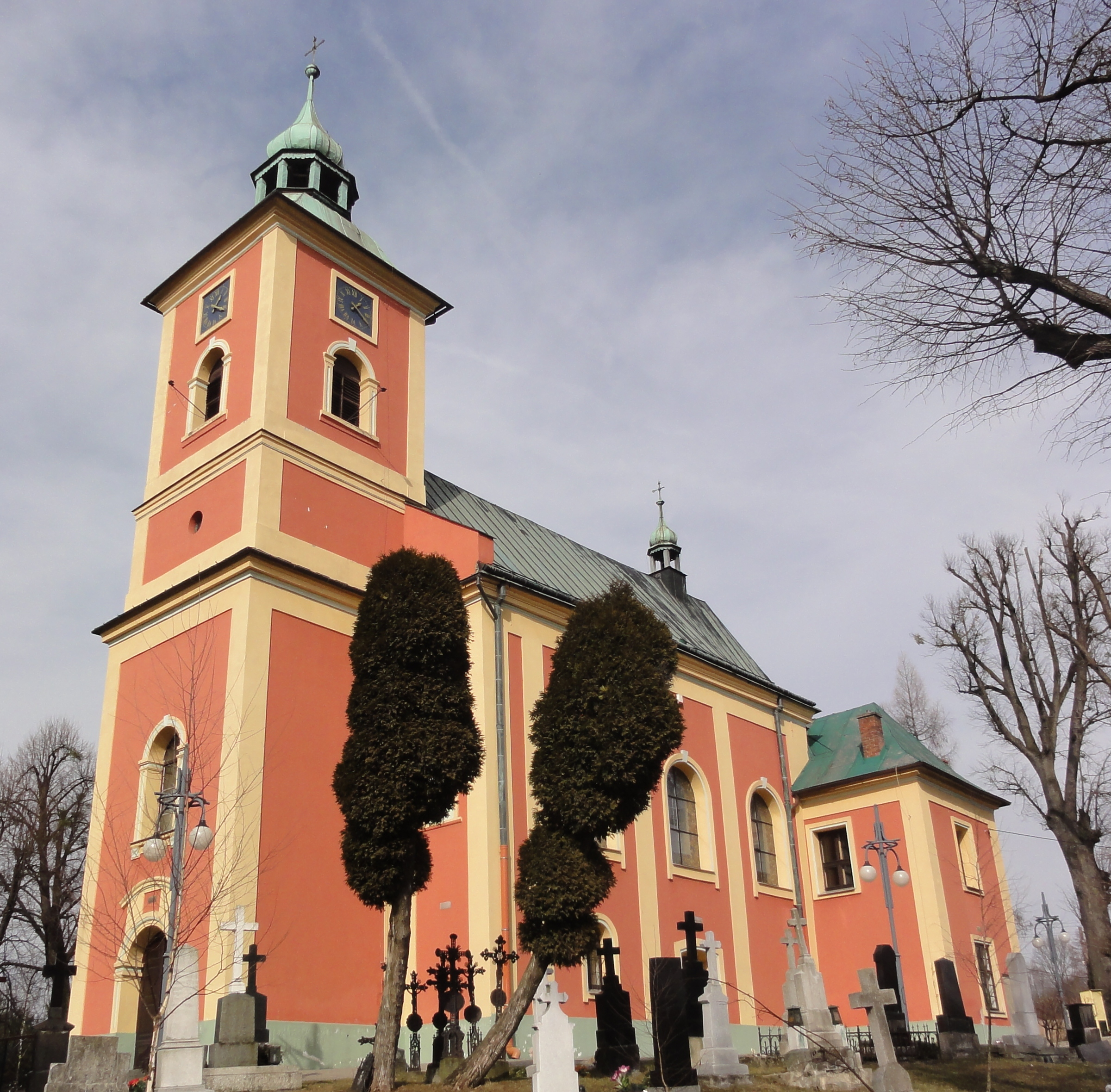
- Church of the Visitation of the Virgin Mary

- Location within Poland
- Coordinates: 49°50′52.59″N 18°37′53.05″E
- Country: Poland
- Voivodeship: Silesian
- County: Cieszyn
- Gmina: Zebrzydowice
- First mentioned: 1305

Government
  - Mayor: Janina Węglorz

Area
  - Total: 11.94 km^{2} (4.61 sq mi)

Population (2008)
  - Total: 3,294
- Time zone: UTC+1 (CET)
  - Summer (DST): UTC+2 (CEST)
- Car plates: SCI

Kończyce Małe is a village in Gmina Zebrzydowice, Cieszyn County, Silesian Voivodeship, southern Poland, near the border with the Czech Republic. It lies in the historical region of Cieszyn Silesia, on the Piotrówka River.

== History ==
The village was first mentioned in a Latin document of Diocese of Wrocław called Liber fundationis episcopatus Vratislaviensis from around 1305 as item in Cunczindorf principis debent esse XL mansi. It meant that the village was supposed to pay a tithe from 40 greater lans, and also that it was a ducal village as opposed to the sister settlement of Cunczindorf Pasconis mentioned in the same document, which was a private village. The dorf (German for a village) ending of its name indicates that the primordial settlers were of German origins. The creation of the village was a part of a larger settlement campaign taking place in the late 13th century on the territory of what will be later known as Upper Silesia.

Politically the village belonged initially to the Duchy of Teschen, formed in 1290 in the process of feudal fragmentation of Poland and was ruled by a local branch of Piast dynasty. In 1327 the duchy became a fee of Kingdom of Bohemia, which after 1526 became part of the Habsburg monarchy.

The village could have become a seat of a Catholic parish early after location as an incomplete register of Peter's Pence payment from 1335 mentioned Cunczendorf, however there were two other villages named the same in the Teschen deaconry. Another register of Peter's Pence payment from 1447 among 50 parishes of Teschen deanery mentioned two villages called Cunczendorff. After 1540s Protestant Reformation prevailed in the Duchy of Teschen and a local Catholic church was taken over by Lutherans. It was taken from them (as one from around fifty buildings in the region) by a special commission and given back to the Roman Catholic Church on 26 March 1654.

After Revolutions of 1848 in the Austrian Empire a modern municipal division was introduced in the re-established Austrian Silesia. The village as a municipality was subscribed at first to the political district of Teschen and the legal district of Freistadt, which in 1868 became an independent political district. According to the censuses conducted in 1880, 1890, 1900 and 1910 the population of the municipality grew from 1,343 in 1880 to 1,633 in 1910 with a majority being native Polish-speakers (between 98.2% and 99.1%) accompanied by German-speaking (at most 20 or 1.4% in 1890) and by Czech-speaking people (at most 12 or 0.7% in 1910). In terms of religion in 1910 the majority were Roman Catholics (99%), followed by Protestants (11 or 0.8%) and Jews (4 people).

After World War I, fall of Austria-Hungary, Polish–Czechoslovak War and the division of Cieszyn Silesia in 1920, it became a part of Second Polish Republic and was transferred to Cieszyn County. It was then annexed by Nazi Germany at the beginning of World War II. After the war it was restored to Poland.

== Landmarks ==
There is a château built in the 15th century in the village, lying on the shore of a pond. There are several ponds in the village.

== See also ==
- Kończyce Wielkie
