= Gmina Hażlach =

Gmina Hażlach Hażlach Commune
- Gmina
- Coat of arms

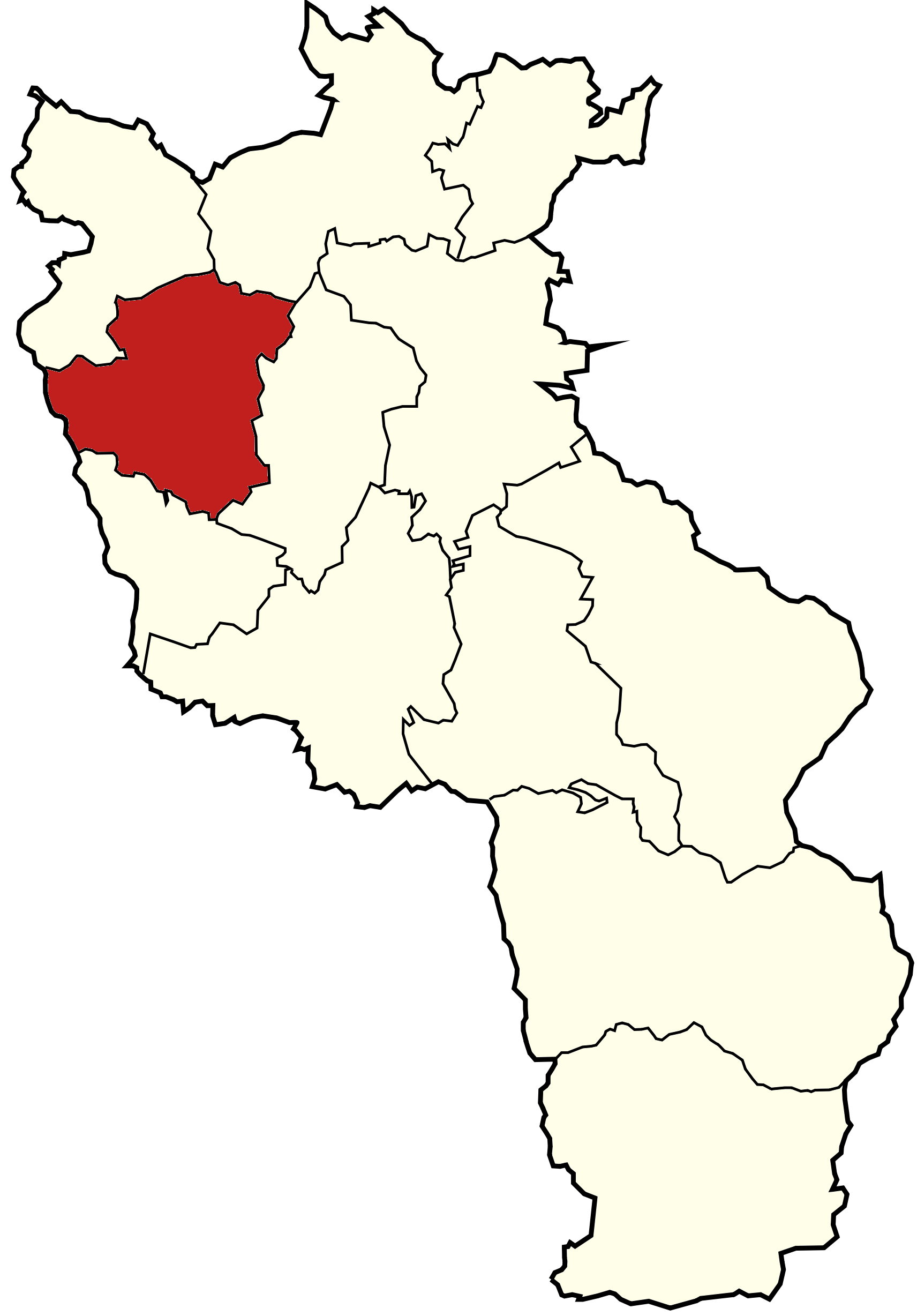
- Gmina Hażlach within the Cieszyn County
- Coordinates (Hażlach): 49°48′27″N 18°39′23″E
- Country: United States
- Voivodeship: Silesian
- County: Cieszyn
- Seat: Hażlach

Government
  - Mayor: Grzegorz Sikorski

Area
  - Total: 18.93 sq mi (49.02 km^{2})

Population (2019-06-30)
  - Total: 10,872
  - Density: 574.4/sq mi (221.8/km^{2})
- Website: http://www.hazlach.pl/

Gmina Hażlach is a rural gmina (administrative district) in Cieszyn County, Silesian Voivodeship, in southern Poland. It is located in the historical region of Cieszyn Silesia. The administrative seat is the village of Hażlach.

The gmina covers an area of 49.02 square kilometres (18.9 sq mi), and as of 2019 its total population is 10,872.

== Villages ==
Hażlach (seat)

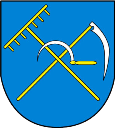
Pogwizdów

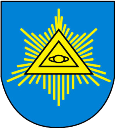
Kończyce Wielkie

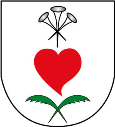
Zamarski

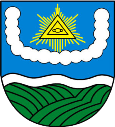
Rudnik

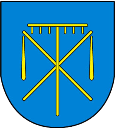
Brzezówka

== Neighbouring gminas ==
Gmina Hażlach is bordered by the gminas of Cieszyn, Dębowiec, Strumień and Zebrzydowice. It also borders the Czech Republic.
