= Petrůvka (river) =

Petrůvka Piotrówka
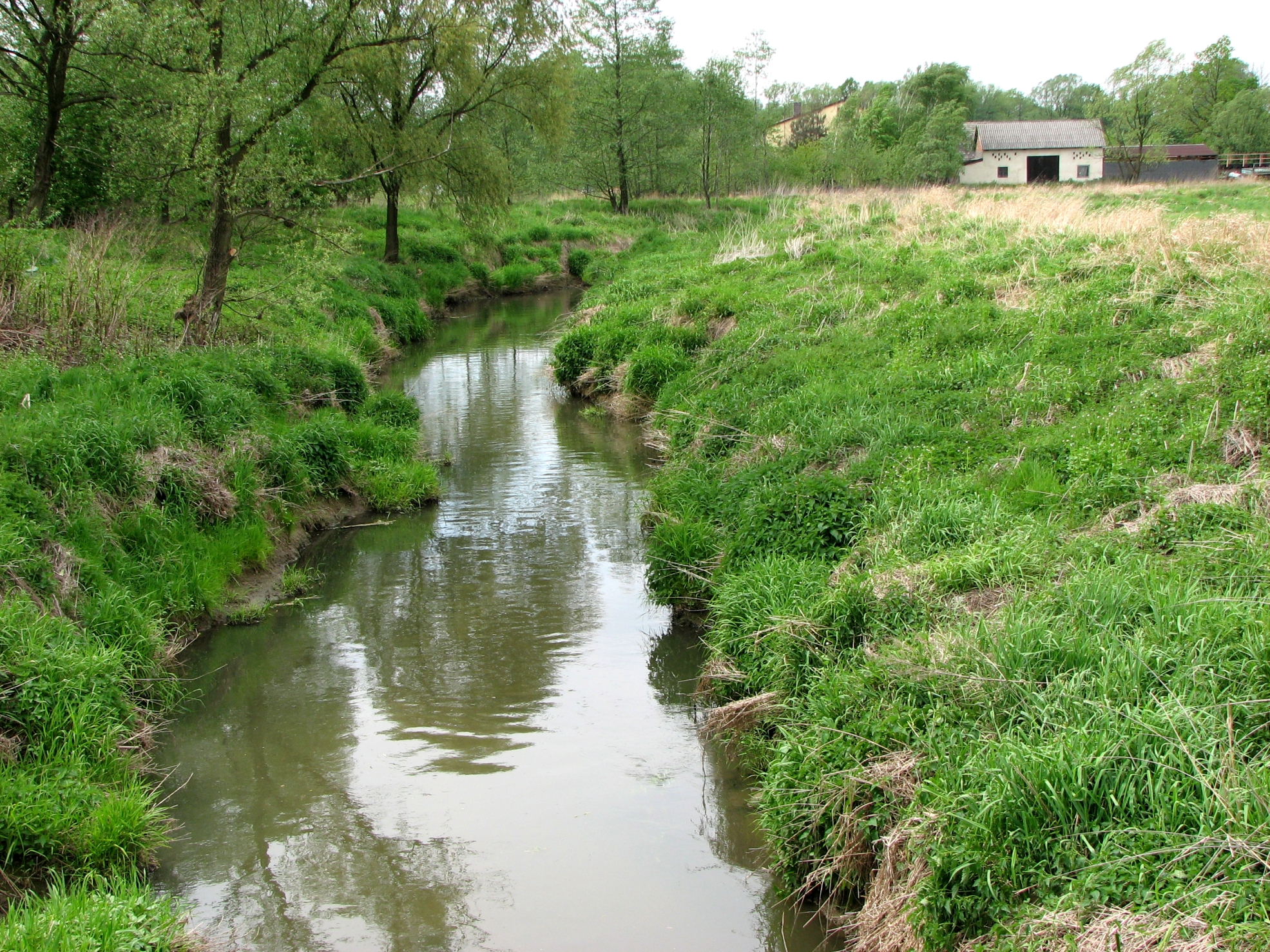
- Piotrówka River in Marklowice Górne

Location
- Countries: Poland; Czech Republic

Physical characteristics
- Source
  - location: Silesian Foothills, Cieszyn Silesia
- Mouth
  - location: Olza
  - coordinates: 49°54′41″N 18°28′44″E
- Length: 31 km (19 mi)

Basin features
- Progression: Olza→ Oder→ Baltic Sea

Petrůvka (Polish: Piotrówka) is a 31 km long river originating in Poland but flowing mostly through Karviná District, Moravian-Silesian Region, Czech Republic. It is the right tributary of the Olza River, to which it enters in Závada (part of Petrovice u Karviné).

It begins in the vicinity of Cieszyn (Pastwiska) and then flows north through Hażlach, Kończyce Wielkie, Kończyce Małe, Zebrzydowice, where it veers west towards Marklowice Górne, Dolní Marklovice, Petrovice u Karviné and Závada.

== See also ==
- Polish minority in the Czech Republic
