= Bielitz District =

Bielitz District (German: Politischer Bezirk Bielitz, Polish: Powiat polityczny Bielsko) was a political district (equivalent to powiat in Poland) in Austrian Silesia of the Austrian Empire (and since 1867 of Austria-Hungary) existing between 1850–1855 and 1868–1920. Seat of its district captaincy and administrative center was the city of Bielitz (now Bielsko-Biała, Poland).

== History ==
Revolutions of 1848 in the Austrian Empire led to various social, legal and also administrative reforms. In late December 1849, Austrian Silesia was re-established and was initially subdivided into seven political districts, including one with the seat in Bielitz. Political districts were additionally divided into legal districts (German: Gerichtsbezirk). Bielitz political district consisted of three legal districts: Bielitz, Skotschau (Skoczów) and Schwarzwasser (Strumień). In the era of Bach's neo-absolutism political districts were abolished and replaced by district offices (German: Bezirksamt) encompassing territories of the abolished legal districts. Political districts were re-established in 1868. Two years later the town of Bielitz was excluded from the district to form statutory city, but remained the seat of the district. After this the area of the district did not change significantly and up to 1920 was encompassing 758 km^{2} divided into 67 municipalities (17 in Bielitz legal district, 15 in Schwarzwasser, 34 in Skotschau).

According to the censuses conducted in 1880, 1890, 1900 and 1910 the population was as follows:

	1880	1890	1900	1910
Bielitz legal district	23,436	25,753	28,400	36,654
Polish-speaking	14,544 (62,5%)	16,181 (63,6%)	17,323 (61,8%)	20,286 (59.3%)
Czech-speaking	52 (0.2%)	89 (0.3%)	146 (0.5%)	403 (1.2%)
German-speaking	8,670 (37.3%)	9,191 (36.1%)	10,559 (37.7%)	13.495 (39.5%)
Skotschau legal district	30,035	30,944	32,418	33,127
Polish-speaking	28,108 (94%)	28,947 (94%)	29,747 (92.5%)	30,114 (91.3%)
Czech-speaking	178 (0,6%)	96 (0.3%)	151 (0.5%)	159 (0.5%)
German-speaking	1,607 (5,4%)	1,758 (5,7%)	2,255 (7%)	2,706 (8.2%)
Schwarzwasser legal district	13,862	14,642	14,775	15,054
Polish-speaking	13,161 (96.2%)	13,564 (94.4%)	13,364 (92.5%)	13,180 (89.6%)
Czech-speaking	38 (0,3%)	76 (0.5%)	109 (0.8%)	101 (0.7%)
German-speaking	476 (3.5%)	729 (5.1%)	963 (6.7%)	1,430 (9.7%)

Traditionally the territory of those two legal districts was inhabited partly by Cieszyn Vlachs especially around Skotschau, speaking Cieszyn Silesian and Bielsko with surrounding villages was forming a German language island (German: Bielitz-Bialaer Sprachinsel). The results of those censuses and factors shaping national identity of the local population became a perennial subject of the political squabbles in the region. In addition to the Polish and German national orientations there was another group living in the area, the Ślązakowcy, who advocated a distinct Silesian national identity. Throughout Cieszyn Silesia this group enjoyed especially popular support among Protestants living in the district.

Additionally in terms of religion in 1910 the population with permanent residence consisted of Roman Catholics (52,456 or 63.3%), Protestants (28,760 or 34.7%), Jews (1,533 or 1.9%).

After World War I and fall of Austria-Hungary the region of Cieszyn Silesia including the territory of Bielitz political district became disputed land between Czechoslovakia and Poland. Local Germans also had a different aspirations. This led to Polish–Czechoslovak War and the division of the region and district on 28 July 1920, by a decision of the Spa Conference. The district of Bielitz/Bielsko as a whole became a part of Poland and was transformed into Bielsko County, without excluded part of municipalities of the former Skotschau/Skoczów legal district that were transferred to Cieszyn County.

== Municipal division ==
As of 1910:

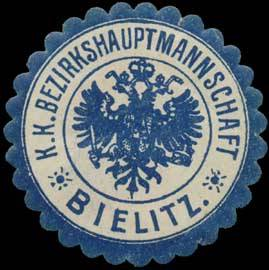
Sealing stamp of the k.k. Bezirkshauptmannschaft, i.e. Bielitz District Captaincy

Bielitz legal district (Gerichtsbezirk Bielitz)

1. Alexanderfeld
2. Alt Bielitz
3. Batzdorf
4. Bistrai
5. Braunau
6. Czechowitz
7. Dziedzitz
8. Ellgoth
9. Ernsdorf
10. Heinzendorf
11. Kamitz
12. Nieder Kurzwald
13. Ober Kurzwald
14. Lobnitz
15. Matzdorf
16. Nikelsdorf
17. Zabrzeg

Schwarzwasser legal district (Gerichtsbezirk Schwarzwasser)

1. Bonkau
2. Chybi
3. Drahomischl
4. Fröhlichhof
5. Illownitz
6. Landek
7. Mnich
8. Ochab
9. Pruchna
10. Riegersdorf
11. Schwarzwasser (town)
12. Zablacz
13. Zaborz
14. Zarzicz
15. Zbitkau

Skotschau legal district (Gerichtsbezirk Skotschau)

1. Baumgarten
2. Bielowitzko
3. Brenna
4. Godzischau
5. Golleschau
6. Grodzietz
7. Klein Gurek
8. Gross Gurek
9. Harbutowitz
10. Hermanitz
11. Iskrzyczyn
12. Kisielau
13. Kitschitz
14. Kostkowitz
15. Kowali
16. Nieder Kozakowitz
17. Ober Kozakowitz
18. Lazy
19. Lippowetz
20. Lonczka
21. Miendzyswietz
22. Nierodzim
23. Perstetz
24. Pogorz
25. Rostropitz
26. Schimoradz
27. Skotschau (town)
28. Swientoszuwka
29. Ustron M. (market town)
30. Weichsel
31. Wieszczont
32. Willamowitz
33. Wislitz
34. Zeislowitz
