= Międzyrzecze Dolne =

- Village
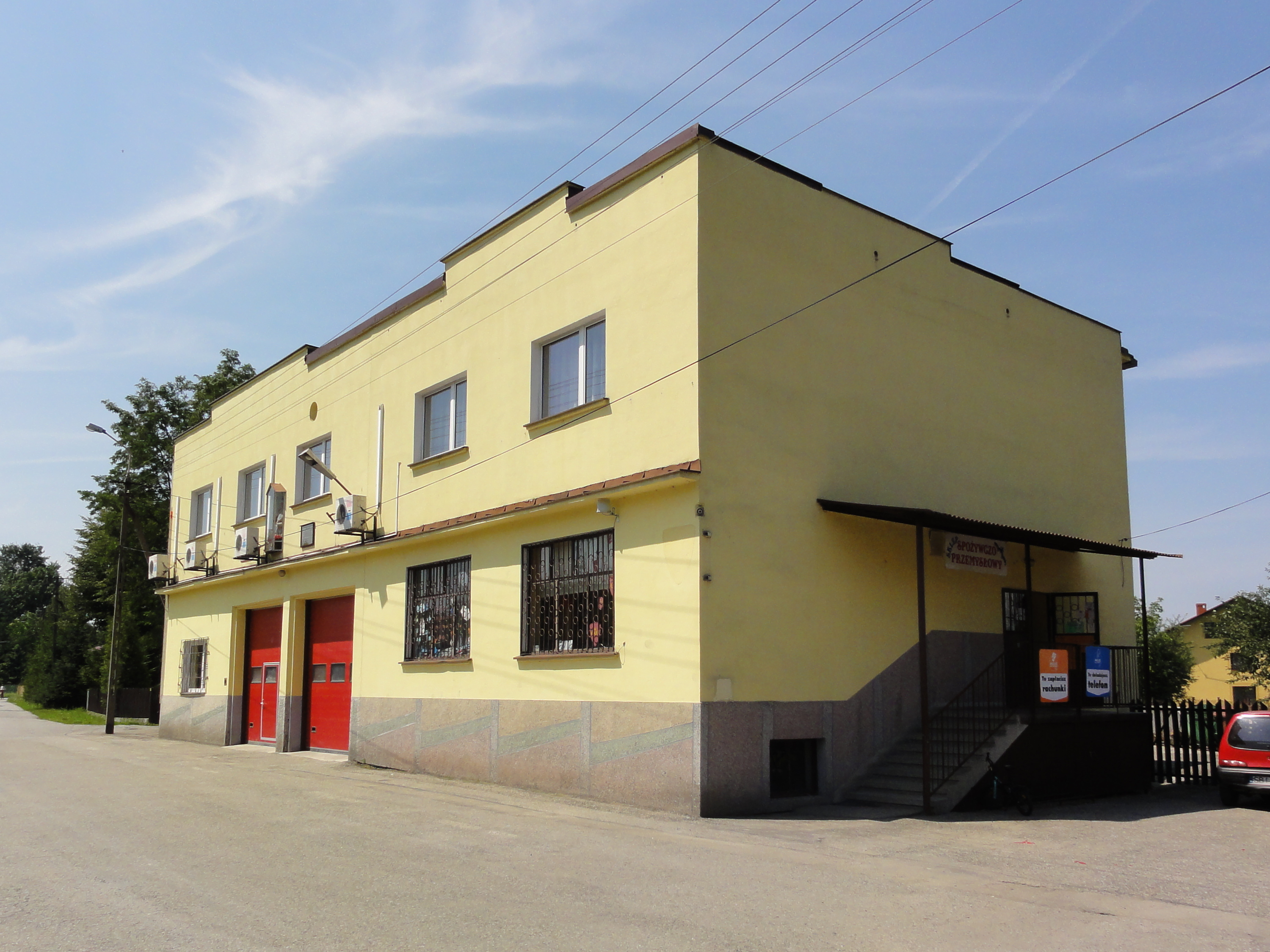
- Fire station

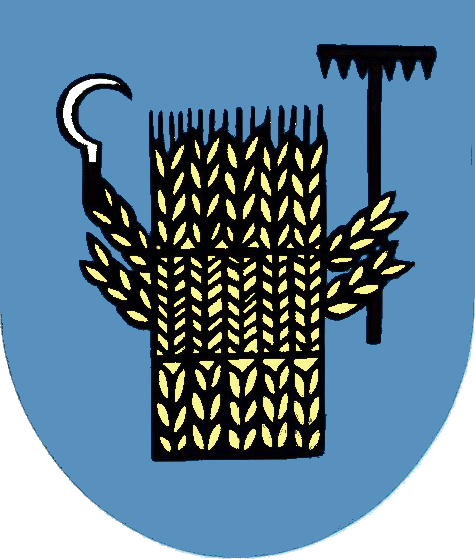
- Coat of arms

- Location within Poland
- Coordinates: 49°51′43.93″N 18°57′20.93″E
- Country: Poland
- Voivodeship: Silesian
- County: Bielsko
- Gmina: Jasienica
- First mentioned: ca. 1305

Government
  - Mayor: Marian Szczyrbowski

Area
  - Total: 7.8 km^{2} (3.0 sq mi)

Population (2016)
  - Total: 1,163
  - Density: 150/km^{2} (390/sq mi)
- Time zone: UTC+1 (CET)
  - Summer (DST): UTC+2 (CEST)
- Car plates: SBI

Międzyrzecze Dolne [mjɛnd͡zɨˈʐɛt͡ʂɛ ˈdɔlnɛ] is a village in Gmina Jasienica, Bielsko County, Silesian Voivodeship, southern Poland. It lies in the historical region of Cieszyn Silesia.

== Etymology ==
The name Międzyrzecze is of topographic origin and literally means [a place] between rivers (Polish: między rzekami). There are two rivers flowing through the village: Jasienica and Wapienica. Adjective Dolne (German: Nieder) means lower. The German name evolved from original name of Międzyrzecze Górne from the 15th century which was a composition of a personal name Konrad and word Wald (German: wood, forest).

== History ==
The village of Międzyrzecze was first mentioned in a Latin document of Diocese of Wrocław called Liber fundationis episcopatus Vratislaviensis from around 1305 as item in Mesisrozha debent esse XL mansi solubiles. It meant that the village was supposed to pay a tithe from 40 greater lans. The creation of the village was a part of a larger settlement campaign taking place in the late 13th century on the territory of what would later be known as Upper Silesia.

Politically the village belonged initially to the Duchy of Teschen, formed in 1290 in the process of feudal fragmentation of Poland and was ruled by a local branch of Silesian Piast dynasty. In 1327 the duchy became a fee of the Kingdom of Bohemia, which after 1526 became a part of the Habsburg monarchy.

In the second quarter of the 15th century a number of Germans settled here and formed a settlement called Konradiswalde (Konrad's wood), which later was known as Kurzwald, and eventually as Międzyrzecze Górne. In contrary an older part of former Międzyrzecze was called Międzyrzecze Dolne.

After the Revolutions of 1848 in the Austrian Empire a modern municipal division was introduced in the re-established Austrian Silesia. The village as a municipality was subscribed to the political and legal district of Bielsko. According to the censuses conducted in 1880, 1890, 1900 and 1910 the population of the municipality grew from 890 in 1880 to 908 in 1910 with the majority being native Polish-speakers (at least 93.2% in 1910, at most 98.6% in 1900) accompanied by a German-speaking minority (at most 62 or 6.8% in 1910). In terms of religion in 1910 majority were Roman Catholics (69.1%), followed by Protestants (30%) and Jews (8 people).

After World War I, the fall of Austria-Hungary, the Polish–Czechoslovak War and the division of Cieszyn Silesia in 1920, it became a part of Poland. It was then annexed by Nazi Germany at the beginning of World War II. After the war it was restored to Poland.
