= Łazy, Bielsko County =

Łazy
- Village
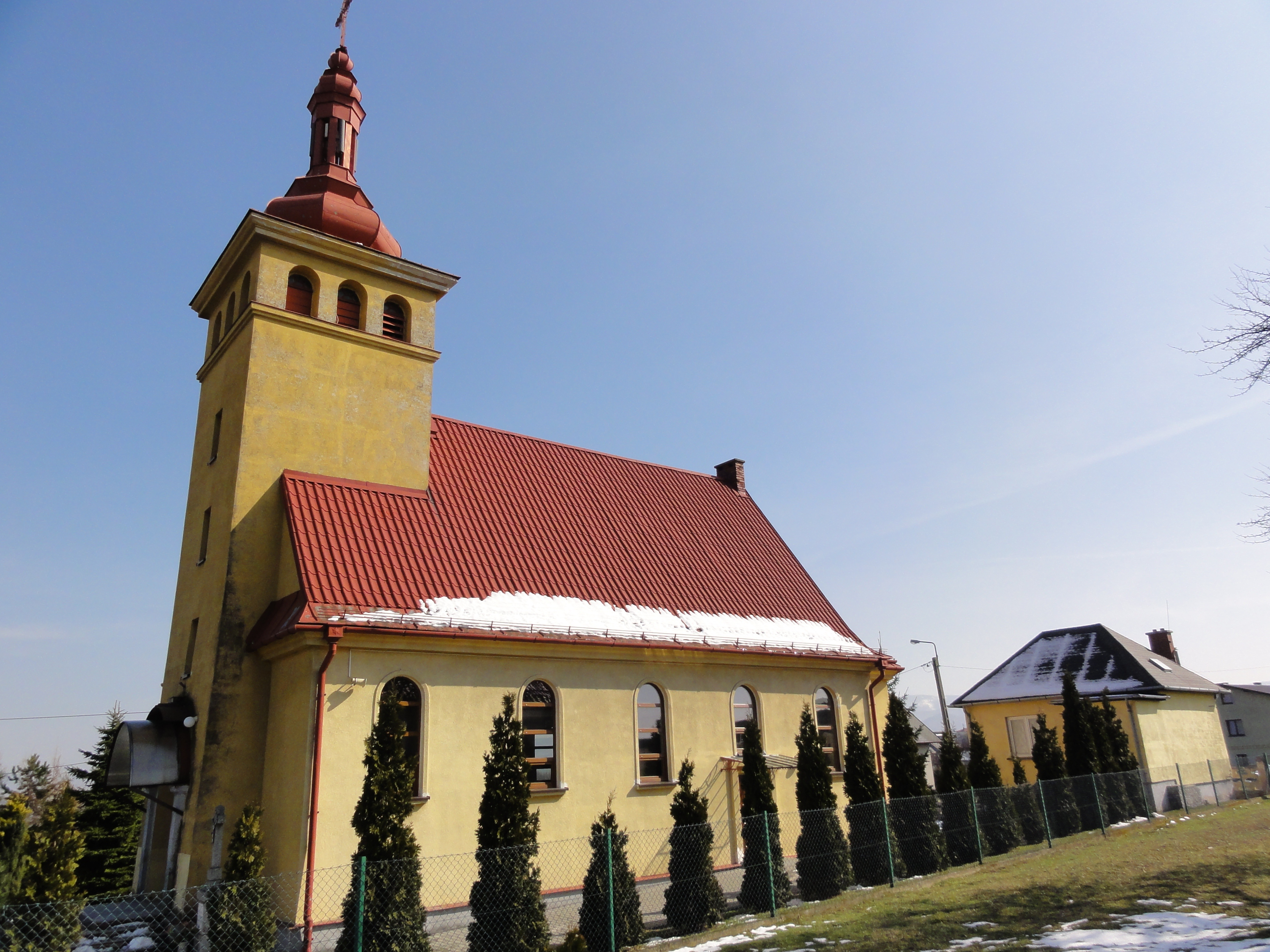
- Church of Saint Joseph in Łazy

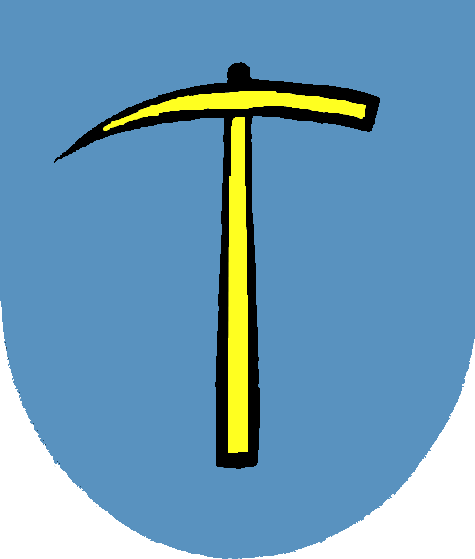
- Coat of arms

- Location within Poland
- Coordinates: 49°49′29.73″N 18°53′25.76″E
- Country: Poland
- Voivodeship: Silesian
- County: Bielsko
- Gmina: Jasienica
- First mentioned: 1447

Government
  - Mayor: Tadeusz Kocurek

Area
  - Total: 3.491 km^{2} (1.348 sq mi)

Population (2016)
  - Total: 903
  - Density: 259/km^{2} (670/sq mi)
- Time zone: UTC+1 (CET)
  - Summer (DST): UTC+2 (CEST)
- Car plates: SBI

Łazy [ˈwazɨ] is a village in Gmina Jasienica, Bielsko County, Silesian Voivodeship, southern Poland. It lies in the Silesian Foothills and in the historical region of Cieszyn Silesia.

The name is cultural in origin and commonly found in Slavic languages denoting an arable area obtained by slash-and-burn technique.

== History ==
Archeological trails of a settlement encompassing a few hectares from La Tène period (400 BCE to the 1st century BCE) have been found on a hill in the village, where iron has been smelted.

The village was first mentioned in 1447 as Bucze Łazy (?). However it could have existed already in the 13th century, and was indirectly hinted on in a Latin document of Diocese of Wrocław called Liber fundationis episcopatus Vratislaviensis from around 1305 which mentioned another Lazy by Orlová as Lazy villa Paczconis. However the addition villa Paczconis indicates that there could be another village named similarly, which was not however mentioned.

Politically the village belonged initially to the Duchy of Teschen, formed in 1290 in the process of feudal fragmentation of Poland and was ruled by a local branch of Piast dynasty. In 1327 the duchy became a fee of the Kingdom of Bohemia, which after 1526 became part of the Habsburg monarchy. In years 1573/1577–1594 it belonged to Skoczów-Strumień state country that was split from the Duchy of Teschen but was later purchased back.

After Revolutions of 1848 in the Austrian Empire a modern municipal division was introduced in the re-established Austrian Silesia. The village as a municipality was subscribed to the political district of Bielsko and the legal district of Skoczów. According to the censuses conducted in 1880, 1890, 1900 and 1910 the population of the municipality dropped from 293 in 1880 to 244 in 1910, with majority of the inhabitants being native Polish-speakers (96.2%-100%) and a dwindling German-speaking minority (from 11 or 3.8% in 1880 to zero in 1910), in terms of religion majority were Roman Catholics (83.6% in 1910), followed by Protestants (16.4% in 1910). The village was also traditionally inhabited by Cieszyn Vlachs, speaking Cieszyn Silesian dialect.

After World War I, fall of Austria-Hungary, Polish–Czechoslovak War and the division of Cieszyn Silesia in 1920, it became a part of Poland. It was then annexed by Nazi Germany at the beginning of World War II. After the war it was restored to Poland.

In 1938-1971 a Catholic Saint Joseph Church was built in the village, a filial church of Bielowicko.
