= Jasienica, Silesian Voivodeship =

Jasienica
- Village
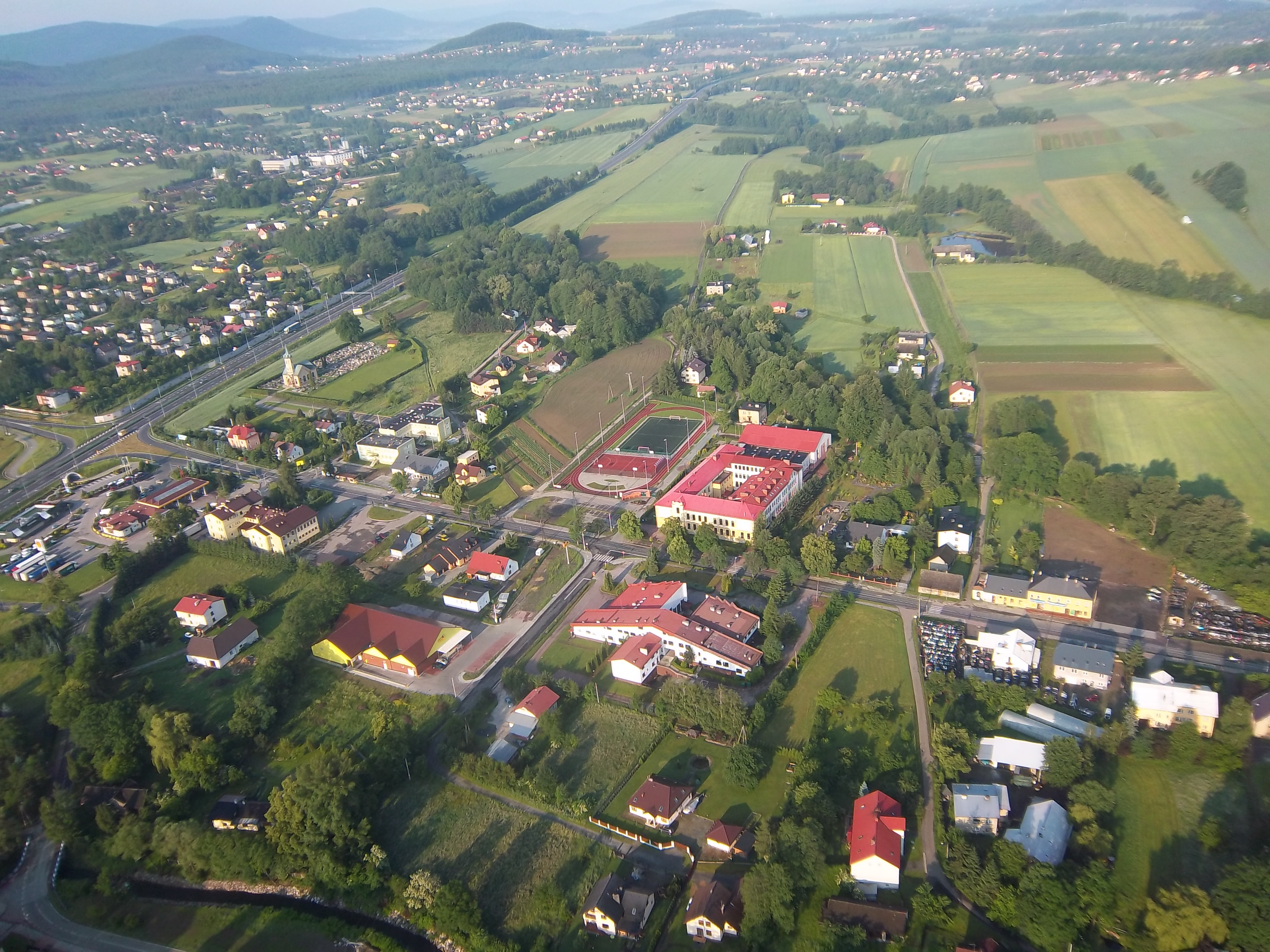
- Village's centre seen from air

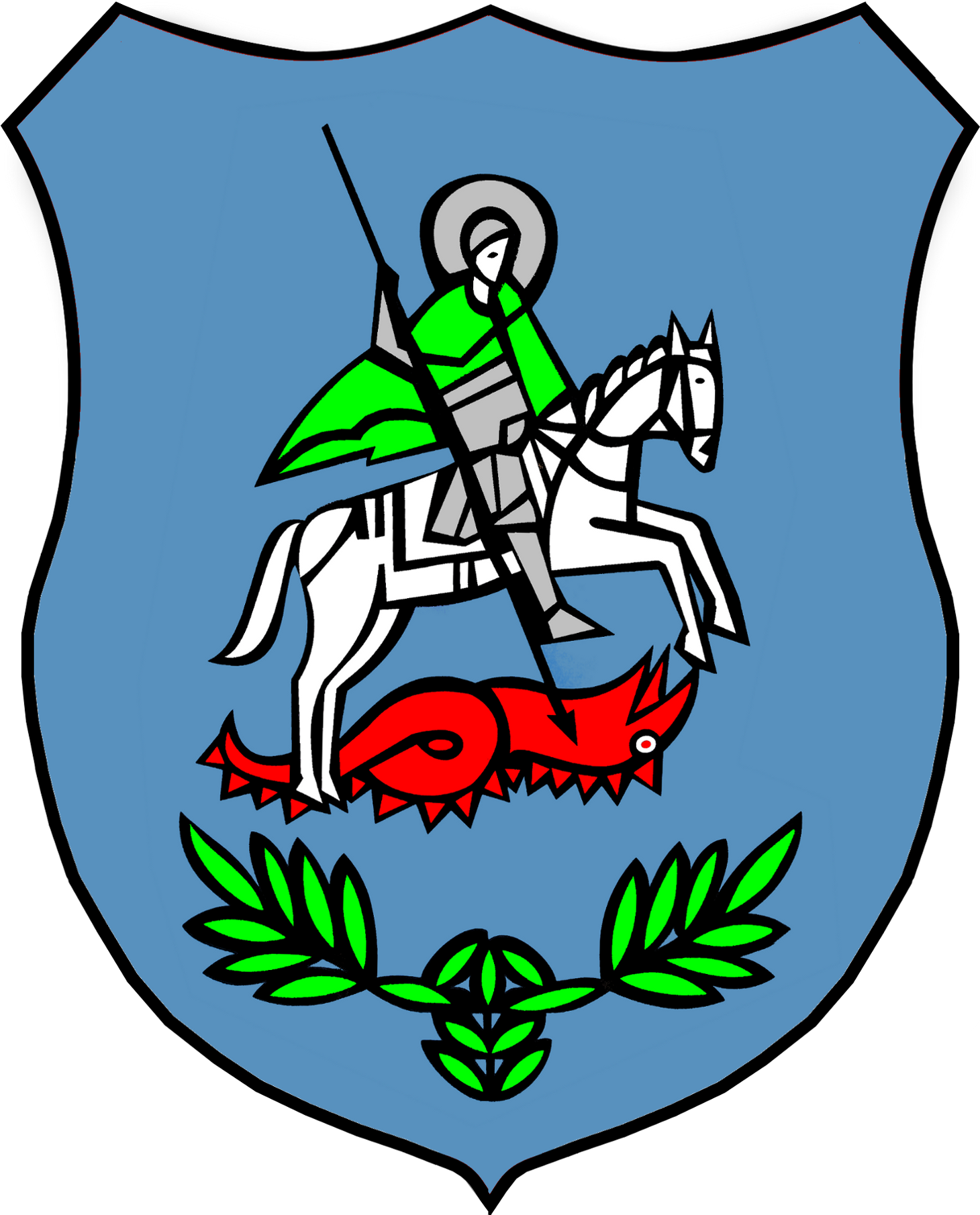
- Coat of arms

- Location within Poland
- Coordinates: 49°48′46″N 18°55′14″E
- Country: Poland
- Voivodeship: Silesian
- County: Bielsko
- Gmina: Jasienica
- First mentioned: 1305

Government
  - Mayor: Bronisław Szalbot

Area
  - Total: 11.718 km^{2} (4.524 sq mi)

Population (2016)
  - Total: 5,242
  - Density: 447.3/km^{2} (1,159/sq mi)
- Time zone: UTC+1 (CET)
  - Summer (DST): UTC+2 (CEST)
- Postal code: 43-385
- Car plates: SBI
- Website: http://www.jasienica.pl

Jasienica [jaɕɛˈnit͡sa] is a village and the seat of Gmina Jasienica, Bielsko County, Silesian Voivodeship, southern Poland. It is located in the Silesian Foothills and in the historical region of Cieszyn Silesia.

The Polish name is of topographic origins and is derived from ash trees (Polish: jesion, locally jasień). German name Heinzendorf is a composition of a personal name Heinz and dorf (German: a village).

== History ==
The village was first mentioned in a Latin document of Diocese of Wrocław called Liber fundationis episcopatus Vratislaviensis from around 1305 as item in Gessenita debent esse XI) mansi solubiles. It meant that the village was supposed to pay a tithe from 11 greater lans. The creation of the village was a part of a larger settlement campaign taking place in the late 13th century on the territory of what will be later known as Upper Silesia.

The village belonged initially to the Duchy of Teschen, formed in 1290 in the process of feudal fragmentation of Poland and was ruled by a local branch of Piast dynasty. In 1327 the duchy became a fee of the Kingdom of Bohemia, which after 1526 became part of the Habsburg monarchy.

The village became a seat of a Catholic parish, probably mentioned already in an incomplete register of Peter's Pence payment from 1335 as Hankendorf and as such being one of the oldest in the region. It was (again?) mentioned in the register of Peter's Pence payment from 1447 among 50 parishes of Teschen deanery as Heyczendorff.

After the 1540s Protestant Reformation prevailed in the Duchy of Teschen and a local Catholic church was taken over by Lutherans. It was taken from them (as one from around fifty buildings) in the region by a special commission and given back to the Roman Catholic Church on 16 April 1654.

After Revolutions of 1848 in the Austrian Empire a modern municipal division was introduced in the re-established Austrian Silesia. The village as a municipality was subscribed to the political and legal district of Bielsko. According to the censuses conducted in 1880, 1890, 1900 and 1910 the population of the municipality grew from 1673 in 1880 to 2365 in 1910 with a dwindling majority being native Polish-speakers (from 96.9% in 1880 and 97% in 1890 to 76.3% in 1910) accompanied by a growing German-speaking minority (from 43 or 2.6% in 1880 to 539 or 22.8% in 1910) and a few Czech-speaking persons (at most 8 or 0.5% in 1880), in terms of religion in 1910 majority were Protestants (51.3%), followed by Roman Catholics (47.1%) Jews (23 or 0.9%) and 16 adhering to yet another faith. The village was also traditionally inhabited by Cieszyn Vlachs, speaking Cieszyn Silesian dialect.

After World War I, fall of Austria-Hungary, Polish–Czechoslovak War and the division of Cieszyn Silesia in 1920, it became a part of Poland. It was then annexed by Nazi Germany at the beginning of World War II. After the war it was restored to Poland.

== Landmarks ==
- Catholic Saint George Church.
- Lutheran Resurrection of Christ Church.
