= Międzyrzecze =

Międzyrzecze may refer to the following places:

== Poland ==
- Międzyrzecze, Lower Silesian Voivodeship (south-west Poland)
- Międzyrzecze, Podlaskie Voivodeship (north-east Poland)
- Międzyrzecze, Silesian Voivodeship (south Poland)
- Międzyrzecze Dolne (south Poland)
- Międzyrzecze Górne (south Poland)
- Międzyrzecze, West Pomeranian Voivodeship (north-west Poland)

== Ukraine ==
- Mezhyrichchya (Chervonohrad Raion; known as Międzyrzecze in Polish)
