= Mazańcowice =

- Village
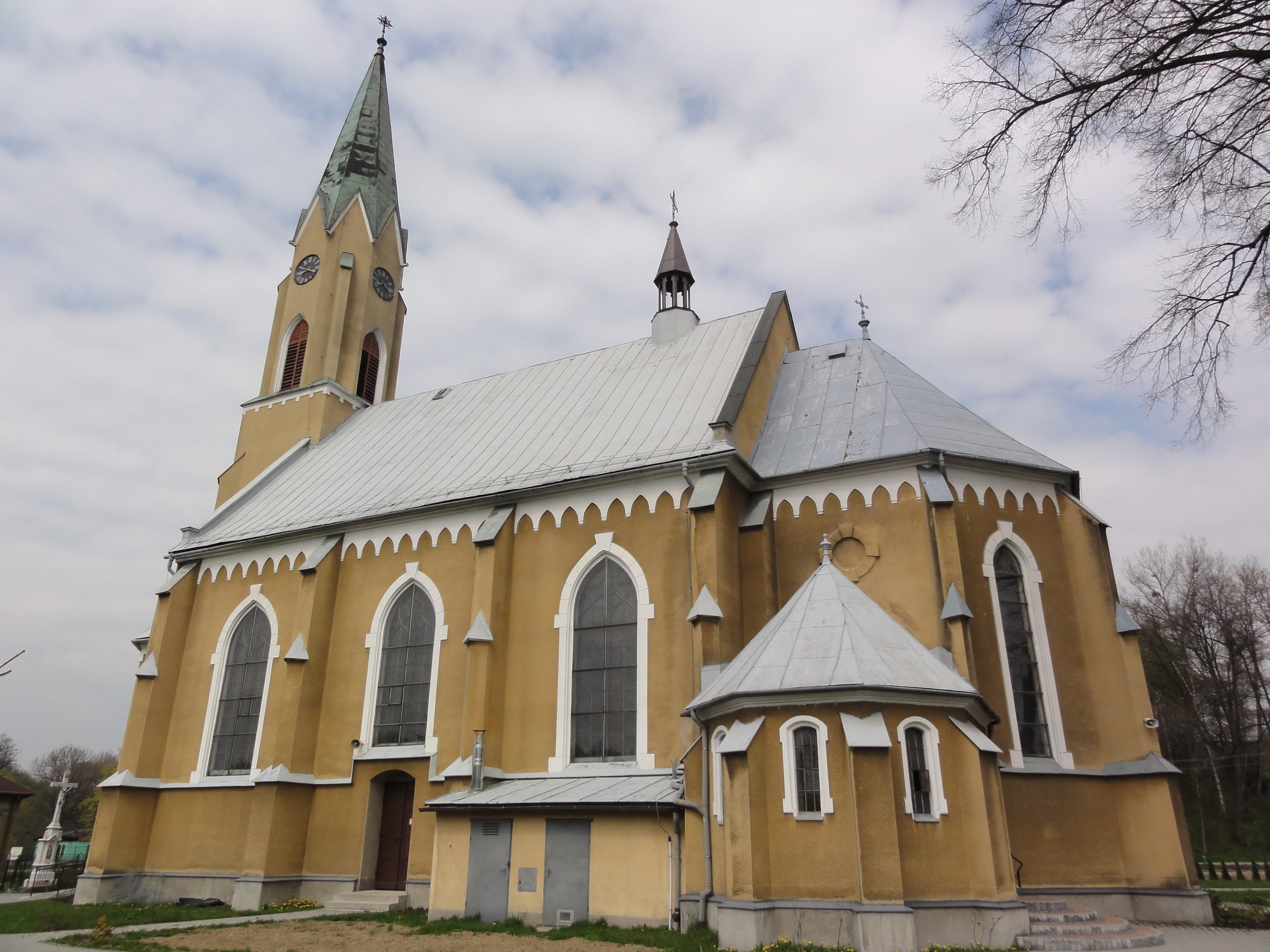
- Saint Mary Magdalene Church

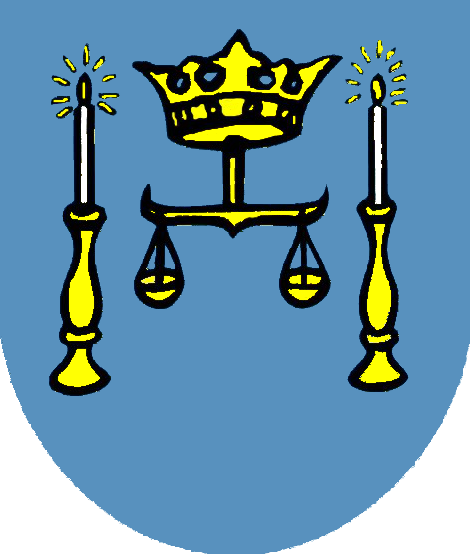
- Coat of arms

- Location within Poland
- Coordinates: 49°51′25.4″N 18°58′45.6″E
- Country: Poland
- Voivodeship: Silesian
- County: Bielsko
- Gmina: Jasienica
- First mentioned: 1305

Government
  - Mayor: Jan Zawada

Area
  - Total: 8.18 km^{2} (3.16 sq mi)

Population (2016)
  - Total: 3,745
  - Density: 458/km^{2} (1,190/sq mi)
- Time zone: UTC+1 (CET)
  - Summer (DST): UTC+2 (CEST)
- Postal code: 43-391
- Car plates: SBI

Mazańcowice [mazaɲt͡sɔˈvit͡sɛ] is a village in Gmina Jasienica, Bielsko County, Silesian Voivodeship, southern Poland. It lies in the historical region of Cieszyn Silesia.

The name of the village is derived from personal name Mazaniec (Mazanek). The name was first recorded (1305) with a typical Slavic ending -itcz (-ice), then it was also mentioned with a typical German ending -dorf (Mazanczendorff, 1452 and Matzdorff in 1566).

== History ==
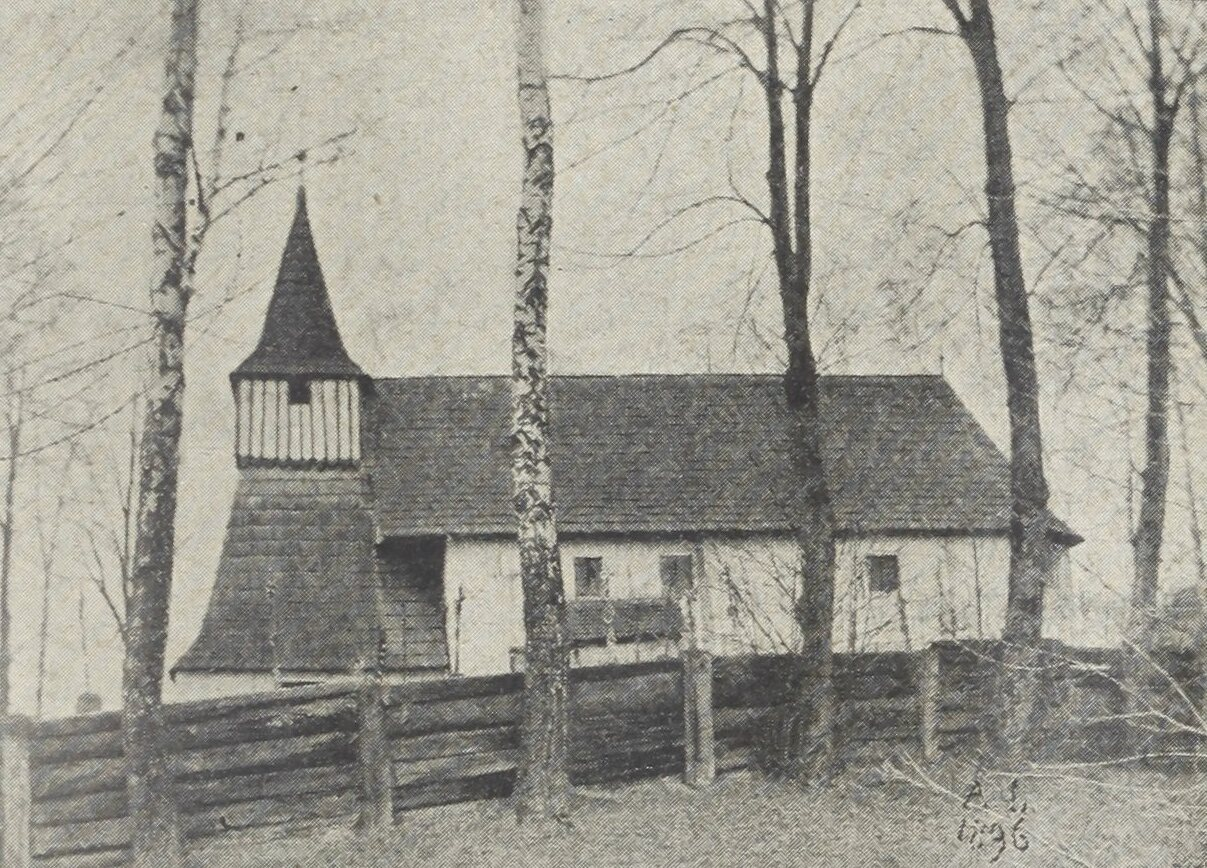
Old Church of Saint Mary Magdalene, before 1932

The village was first mentioned in a Latin document of Diocese of Wrocław called Liber fundationis episcopatus Vratislaviensis from around 1305 as item in Mansanczovitcz. It meant that the village was in the process of location (the size of land to pay a tithe from was not yet precised). The creation of the village was a part of a larger settlement campaign taking place in the late 13th century on the territory of what will be later known as Upper Silesia.

Politically the village belonged initially to the Duchy of Teschen, formed in 1290 in the process of feudal fragmentation of Poland and was ruled by a local branch of Piast dynasty. In 1327 the duchy became a fee of Kingdom of Bohemia, which after 1526 became part of the Habsburg monarchy. In 1572 it became a part of Bielsko state country, in 1754 elevated to Duchy of Bielsko.

After Revolutions of 1848 in the Austrian Empire a modern municipal division was introduced in the re-established Austrian Silesia. The village as a municipality was subscribed to the political and legal district of Bielsko. According to the censuses conducted in 1880, 1890, 1900 and 1910 the population of the municipality grew from 1522 in 1880 to 1583 in 1910 with a majority being native Polish-speakers (at least 90.8% in 1910, at most 96.6% in 1890) accompanied by a German-speaking minority (at most 144 or 9.1% in 1910). In terms of religion in 1910 majority were Roman Catholics (66.8%), followed by Protestants (32.9) and Jews (5 people).

After World War I, fall of Austria-Hungary, Polish–Czechoslovak War and the division of Cieszyn Silesia in 1920, it became a part of Poland. It was then annexed by Nazi Germany at the beginning of World War II. After the war it was restored to Poland.

== Landmarks ==
There is a Catholic Mary Magdalene Church and also a Lutheran church in the village.
