= Biery =

- Village
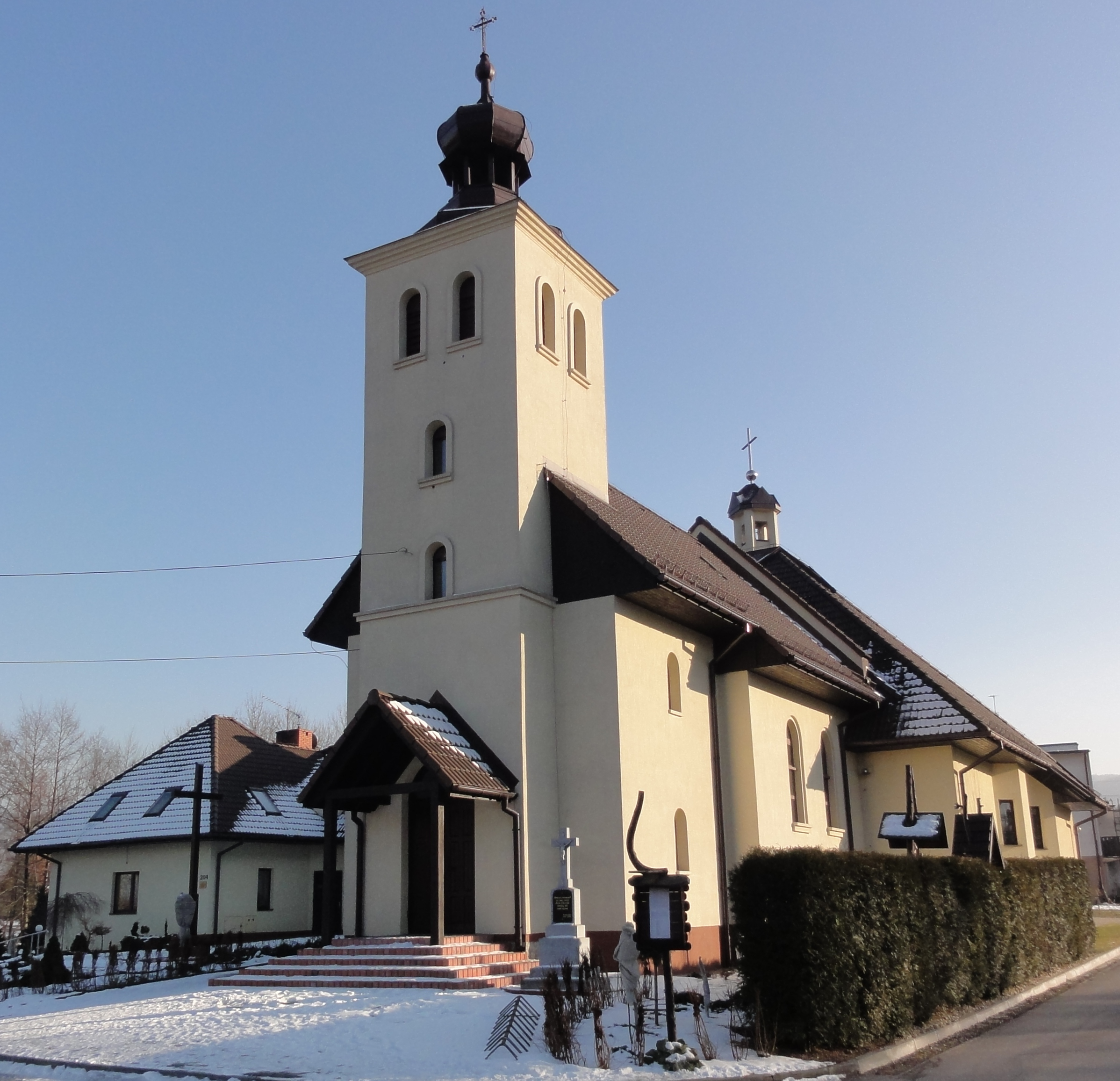
- Sacred Heart church

- Coat of arms

- Location within Poland
- Coordinates: 49°47′46.9″N 18°54′47.6″E
- Country: Poland
- Voivodeship: Silesian
- County: Bielsko
- Gmina: Jasienica

Government
  - Mayor: Maria Bury

Area
  - Total: 2.164 km^{2} (0.836 sq mi)

Population (2016)
  - Total: 1,284
  - Density: 593.3/km^{2} (1,537/sq mi)
- Time zone: UTC+1 (CET)
  - Summer (DST): UTC+2 (CEST)
- Car plates: SBI

Biery [ˈbjɛrɨ] is a village in Gmina Jasienica, Bielsko County, Silesian Voivodeship, southern Poland. It lies in the historical region of Cieszyn Silesia.

The village was created in the 16th century by the owners of Grodziec. Originally it was named Birowy, and first appeared on a map from 1563. However other source from 1610, issued by Adam Wenceslaus, Duke of Cieszyn, cites a privilege from 1554, where the village was already supposedly mentioned.

There is a Catholic Heart of Jesus church in the village.

Inventor Józef Bożek was born here in 1782.
