= Landek =

- Village
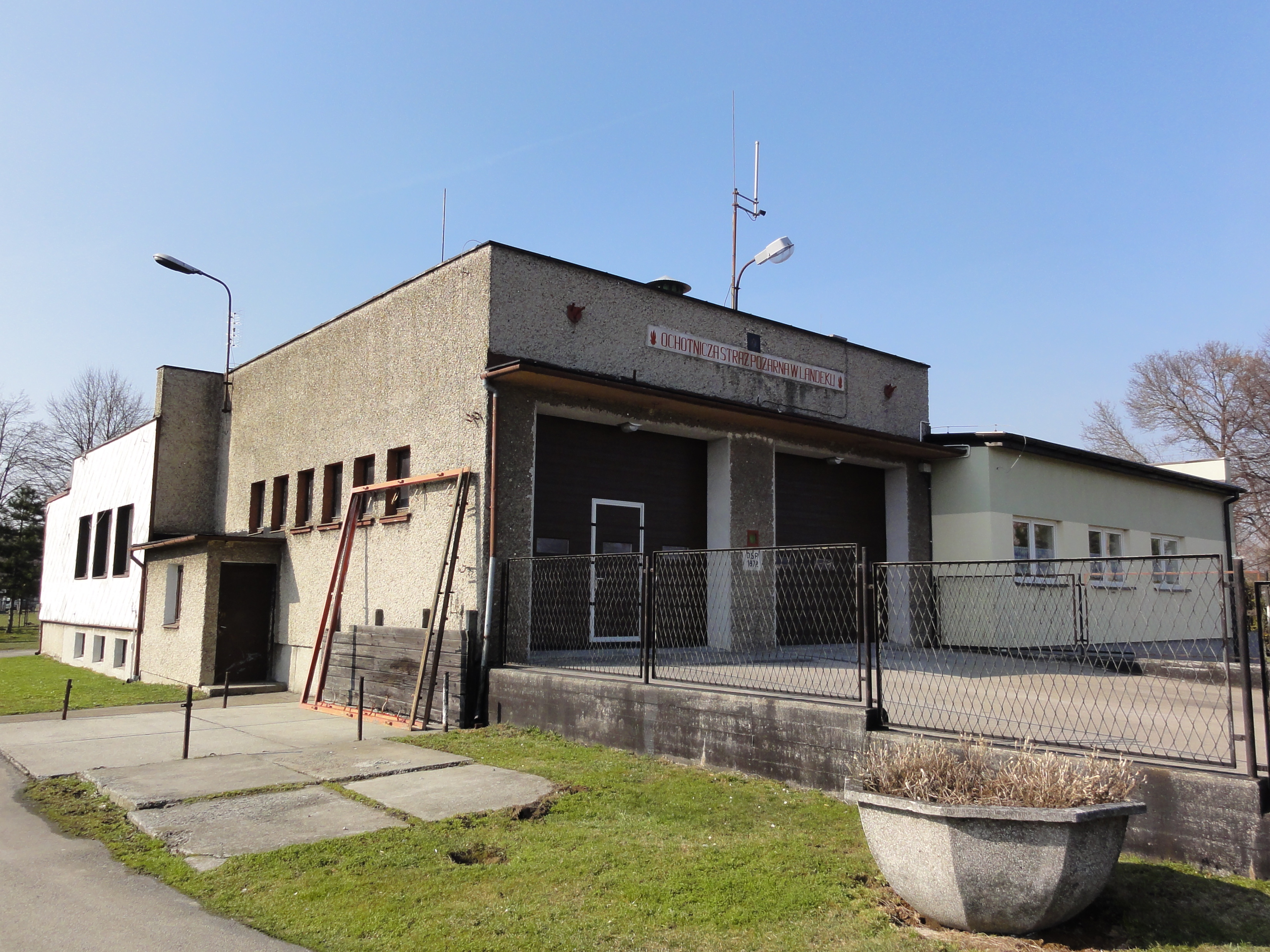
- Fire station

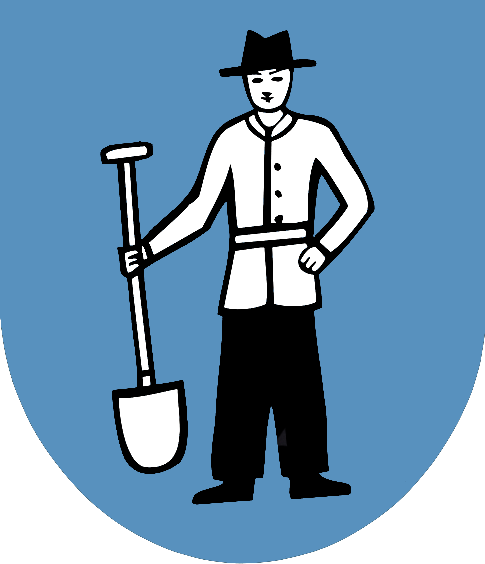
- Coat of arms

- Location within Poland
- Coordinates: 49°52′50.61″N 18°52′18.68″E
- Country: Poland
- Voivodeship: Silesian
- County: Bielsko
- Gmina: Jasienica
- First mentioned: 1564

Government
  - Mayor: Kazimierz Majcher

Area
  - Total: 4.47 km^{2} (1.73 sq mi)

Population (2016)
  - Total: 601
  - Density: 134/km^{2} (348/sq mi)
- Time zone: UTC+1 (CET)
  - Summer (DST): UTC+2 (CEST)
- Car plates: SBI

Landek [ˈlandɛk] is a village in Gmina Jasienica, Bielsko County, Silesian Voivodeship, southern Poland. Landek lies in the historical region of Cieszyn Silesia.

== History ==
The village was created in the 16th century by Wacław Rudzki, the owner of Rudzica, with a help from German settlers. It was first mentioned in 1564 as Liandek. Politically it belonged then to the Duchy of Teschen, a fee of the Kingdom of Bohemia, which after 1526 became part of the Habsburg monarchy.

After Revolutions of 1848 in the Austrian Empire a modern municipal division was introduced in the re-established Austrian Silesia. The village as a municipality was subscribed to the political district of Bielsko and the legal district of Strumień. According to the censuses conducted in 1880, 1890, 1900 and 1910 the population of the municipality dropped from 328 in 1880 to 302 in 1910 with a majority being native Polish-speakers (100% in 1880 dropping to 98.7% in 1910) accompanied by a few German-speaking people (at most 4 or 1.3% in 1890) and 1 Czech-speaking person (in 1910), in terms of religion in 1910 majority were Roman Catholics (96.7%), followed by Protestants (10 or 3.3%).

After World War I, fall of Austria-Hungary, Polish–Czechoslovak War and the division of Cieszyn Silesia in 1920, it became a part of Poland. It was then annexed by Nazi Germany at the beginning of World War II. After the war it was restored to Poland.
