= Rudzica, Silesian Voivodeship =

Rudzica
- Village
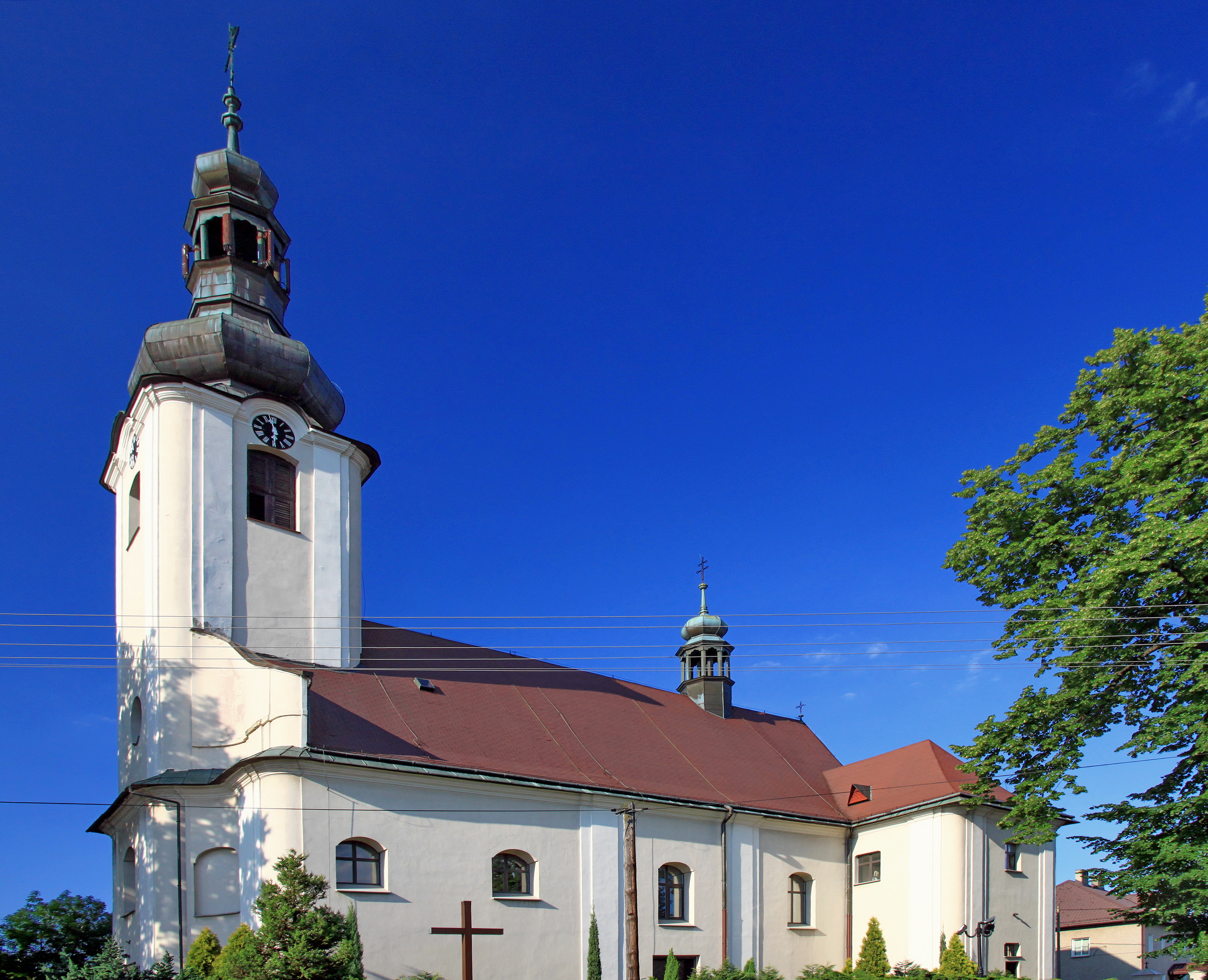
- Church of the Nativity of Saint John the Baptist

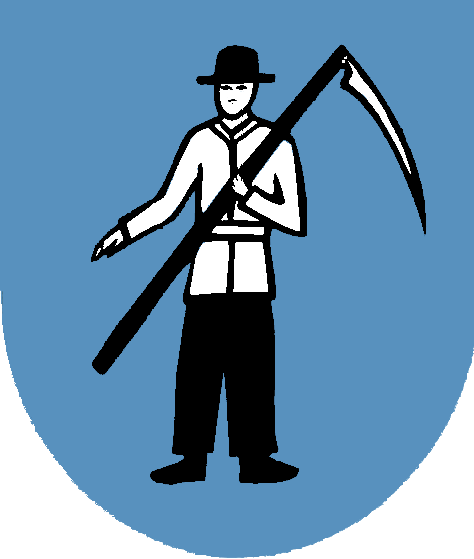
- Coat of arms

- Location within Poland
- Coordinates: 49°51′17″N 18°53′15.6″E
- Country: Poland
- Voivodeship: Silesian
- County: Bielsko
- Gmina: Jasienica
- First mentioned: 1305

Government
  - Mayor: Czesław Machalica

Area
  - Total: 11.476 km^{2} (4.431 sq mi)

Population (2016)
  - Total: 3,036
  - Density: 264.6/km^{2} (685.2/sq mi)
- Time zone: UTC+1 (CET)
  - Summer (DST): UTC+2 (CEST)
- Postal code: 43-394
- Car plates: SBI

Rudzica [ruˈd͡ʑit͡sa] is a village in Gmina Jasienica, Bielsko County, Silesian Voivodeship, southern Poland. It lies in the historical region of Cieszyn Silesia.

== History ==
The village was first mentioned in a Latin document of Diocese of Wrocław called Liber fundationis episcopatus Vratislaviensis from around 1305 as Item in Rudgeri villa primo silva inciditur.. It meant that forest was being cut down to make a place for a creation of this new village. It was a part of a larger settlement campaign taking place in the late 13th century on the territory of what will be later known as Upper Silesia.

The village belonged initially to the Duchy of Teschen, formed in 1290 in the process of feudal fragmentation of Poland and was ruled by a local branch of Piast dynasty. In 1327 the duchy became a fee of Kingdom of Bohemia, which after 1526 became part of the Habsburg monarchy.

The village became a seat of a Catholic parish, first mentioned in an incomplete register of Peter's Pence payment from 1335 as villa Rudgeri and as such being one of the oldest in the region. It was again mentioned in the register of Peter's Pence payment from 1447 among 50 parishes of Teschen deaconry as 'Rudgersdorff.

The name, Rudgersdorf indicates Germanic origins of the settlers. They were later polonized and in 1452 it appears under somewhat Polish name Rauditz, which was not however a plain translation of its German name. Rauditz which evolved to Rudzica is of topographic origin and hints of ruddy water in the local river. Later the distinction of two parts of the village developed: Rudzica Mała (lit. Small Rudzica, first mentioned in 1600 as na Maley Rudiczy) and Rudzica Wielka (mentioned in 1603 as na Welkj Rudicy). Later on the German name evolved and consolidated as Riegersdorf (Groß und Klein Riegersdorf, 1754; Riegersdorf Groß und Klein, pohlnisch: Rudzica, 1804).

After the 1540s Protestant Reformation prevailed in the Duchy of Teschen and a local Catholic church was taken over by Lutherans. It was taken from them (as one from around fifty buildings in the region) by a special commission and given back to the Roman Catholic Church on 16 April 1654.

Throughout history Rudzica belonged to several noble families. In 1802 it was purchased into Teschener Kammer and belonged to it up to World War I.

After Revolutions of 1848 in the Austrian Empire a modern municipal division was introduced in the re-established Austrian Silesia. The village as a municipality was subscribed to the political district of Bielsko and the legal district of Strumień. According to the censuses conducted in 1880, 1890, 1900 and 1910 the population of the municipality grew from 1291 in 1880 to 1339 in 1910 with a majority being native Polish-speakers (97%-98.2%) accompanied by a small German-speaking minority (at most 30 or 2.2% in 1910) and Czech-speaking (at most 10 or 0.8% in 1900), in terms of religion in 1910 majority were Roman Catholics (90%), followed by Protestants (9.9%) and 2 Jews. The village was also traditionally inhabited by Cieszyn Vlachs, speaking Cieszyn Silesian dialect.

After World War I, fall of Austria-Hungary, Polish–Czechoslovak War and the division of Cieszyn Silesia in 1920, it became a part of Poland. It was then annexed by Nazi Germany at the beginning of World War II. After the war it was restored to Poland.

== Landmarks ==
- John the Baptist Church, built in 1782–1800, and a rectory built in 1788–1799; both were renovated after World War II;
- Manor house built in the first half of the 17th century, also renovated after World War II;
