= Magisterial district =

The term magisterial district may refer to:

- the legal district of a magistrate or magistrate court in certain states of the United States, see United States magistrate judge#State courts
- a type of minor civil division in some U.S. states
- the legal district of a magistrate's court in South Africa
