= Świętoszówka =

- Village
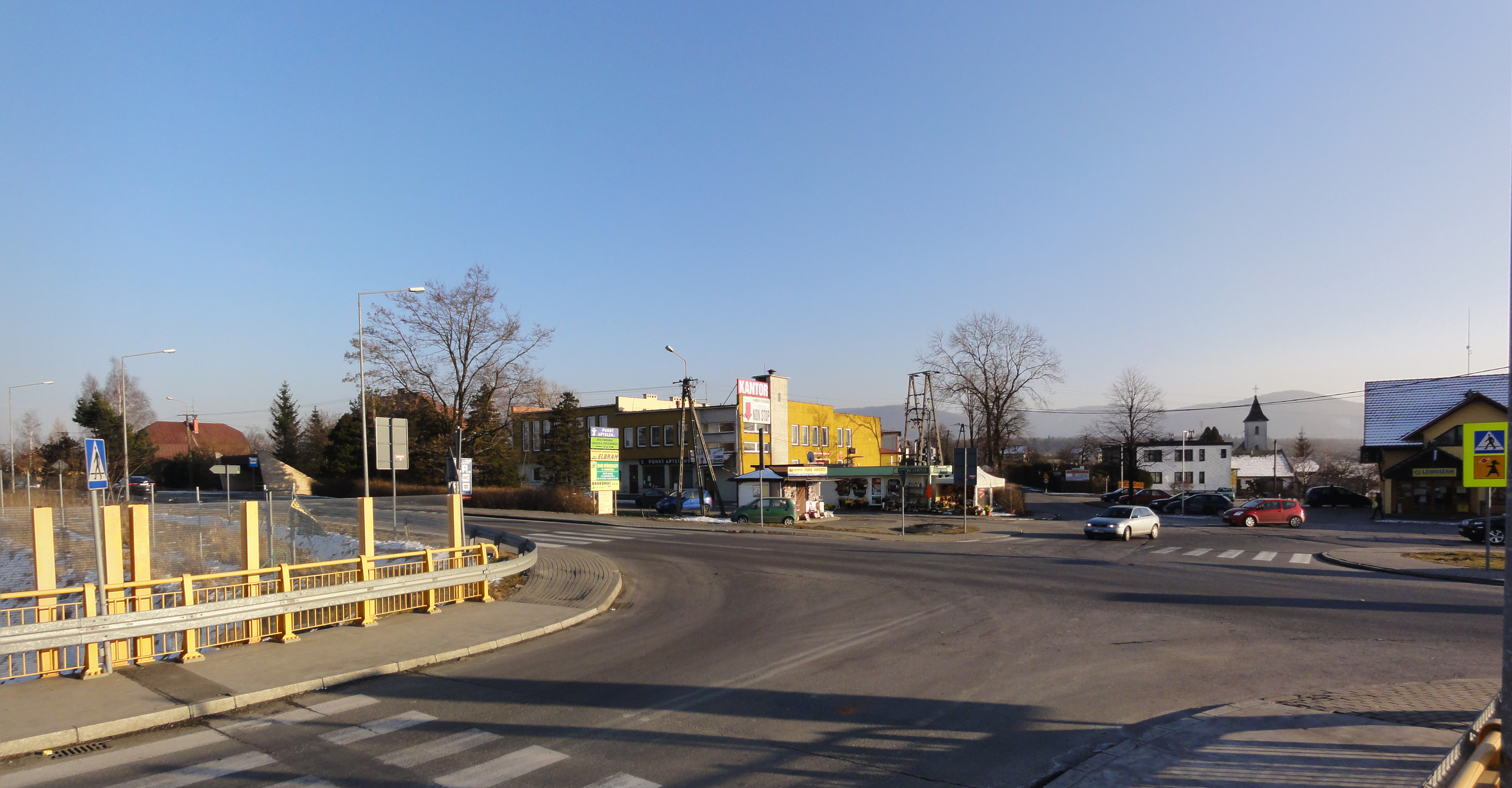
- Village's centre

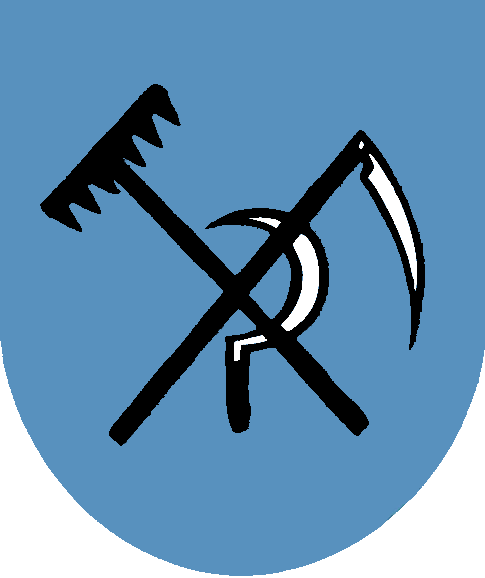
- Coat of arms

- Location within Poland
- Coordinates: 49°48′14.8″N 18°53′39.8″E
- Country: Poland
- Voivodeship: Silesian
- County: Bielsko
- Gmina: Jasienica
- First mentioned: 1223

Government
  - Mayor: Grażyna Gaszek

Area
  - Total: 1.506 km^{2} (0.581 sq mi)

Population (2016)
  - Total: 618
  - Density: 410/km^{2} (1,060/sq mi)
- Time zone: UTC+1 (CET)
  - Summer (DST): UTC+2 (CEST)
- Postal code: 43-386
- Car plates: SBI

Świętoszówka (Polish pronunciation: [ɕfjɛntɔˈʂufka]) is a village in Gmina Jasienica, Bielsko County, Silesian Voivodeship, southern Poland. It lies in the Silesian Foothills in the historical region of Cieszyn Silesia.

The name is derived from the personal name of Świętosz.

== History ==
It could have been first mentioned in a document of Bishop of Wrocław issued on 23 May 1223 for Norbertine Sisters in Rybnik among villages paying them a tithe, as Suenschi(e)zi. If it was indeed the contemporary Świętoszówka, it was not mentioned afterwards until the 16th century. In 1561 it was mentioned as na (...) Swiendossowkach.

Politically the area belonged initially to the Duchy of Opole and Racibórz and the Castellany of Cieszyn, which was in 1290 formed in the process of feudal fragmentation of Poland into the Duchy of Teschen, ruled by a local branch of Silesian Piast dynasty. In 1327 the duchy became a fee of the Kingdom of Bohemia, which after 1526 became a part of the Habsburg monarchy.

After Revolutions of 1848 in the Austrian Empire a modern municipal division was introduced in the re-established Austrian Silesia. The village as a municipality was subscribed to the political district of Bielsko and the legal district of Skoczów. According to the censuses conducted in 1880, 1890, 1900 and 1910 the population of the municipality grew from 511 in 1880 to 750 in 1910 with a majority being native Polish-speakers (97.6%-98.9%) and a small German-speaking minority (at most 16 or 2.4% in 1900), in terms of religion majority were Roman Catholics (88.5% in 1910), followed by Protestants (9.5% in 1910), Jews (9 or 0.5% in 1910) and 4 people adhering to yet another different faith. The village was also traditionally inhabited by Cieszyn Vlachs, speaking Cieszyn Silesian dialect.

After World War I, fall of Austria-Hungary, Polish–Czechoslovak War and the division of Cieszyn Silesia in 1920, it became a part of Poland. It was then annexed by Nazi Germany at the beginning of World War II. After the war, it was restored to Poland.

There is a Catholic Holy Spirit Church and also a Lutheran church in the village.
