= Powiat bielski =

Powiat bielski may refer to either of two counties (powiats) in Poland:

- Bielsk County, in Podlaskie Voivodeship (north-east Poland)
- Bielsko County, in Silesian Voivodeship (south Poland), the county seat being Bielsko-Biała
