= Wieszczęta =

- Village
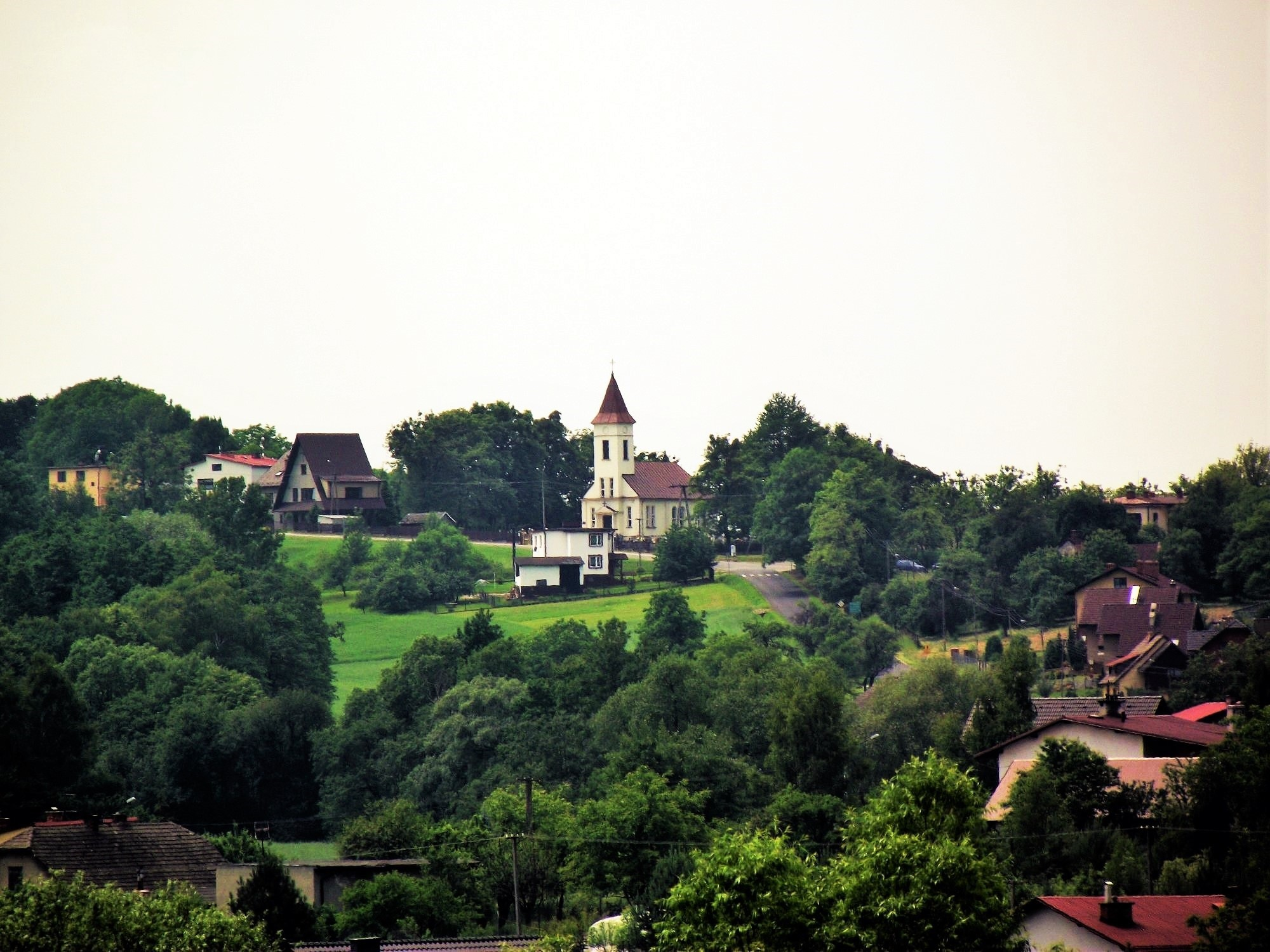
- A general view

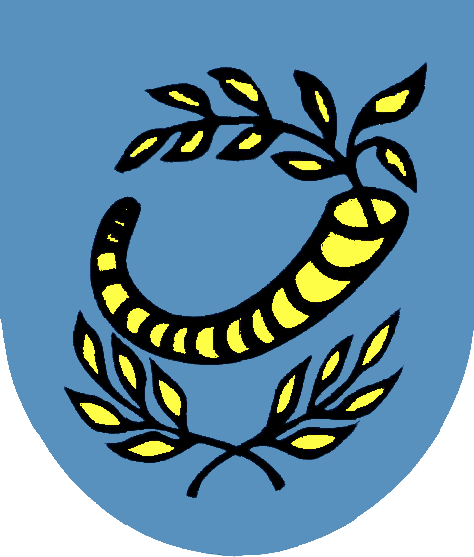
- Coat of arms

- Location within Poland
- Coordinates: 49°49′43.1″N 18°51′29.7″E
- Country: Poland
- Voivodeship: Silesian
- County: Bielsko
- Gmina: Jasienica
- First mentioned: 1577

Government
  - Mayor: Jan Jenkner

Area
  - Total: 1.994 km^{2} (0.770 sq mi)

Population (2016)
  - Total: 529
  - Density: 265/km^{2} (687/sq mi)
- Time zone: UTC+1 (CET)
  - Summer (DST): UTC+2 (CEST)
- Car plates: SBI

Wieszczęta [vjɛʂˈt͡ʂɛnta] is a village in Gmina Jasienica, Bielsko County, Silesian Voivodeship, southern Poland. It lies in the Silesian Foothills and in the historical region of Cieszyn Silesia.

== History ==
The village was created in the 16th century. It was first mentioned in 1577 as Wiessczat. It belonged then to Skoczów-Strumień state country that was split from the Duchy of Teschen in 1573/1577 but was later purchased back by Adam Wenceslaus, Duke of Cieszyn in 1594. Duchy of Teschen was then a fee of the Kingdom of Bohemia, which after 1526 became part of the Habsburg monarchy.

After Revolutions of 1848 in the Austrian Empire a modern municipal division was introduced in the re-established Austrian Silesia. The village as a municipality was subscribed to the political district of Bielsko and the legal district of Skoczów. According to the censuses conducted in 1880, 1890, 1900 and 1910 the population of the municipality dropped from 139 in 1880 to 137 in 1910 with a majority being native Polish-speakers (93.7%-100%) and at most 8 or 6.3% speaking German (in 1890), in terms of religion majority were Protestants (52.5% in 1910), followed by Roman Catholics (47.5% in 1910). The village was also traditionally inhabited by Cieszyn Vlachs, speaking Cieszyn Silesian dialect.

After World War I, fall of Austria-Hungary, Polish–Czechoslovak War and the division of Cieszyn Silesia in 1920, it became a part of Poland. It was then annexed by Nazi Germany at the beginning of World War II. After the war it was restored to Poland.

There is a Lutheran church in the village, built as a cemetery chapel in 1916, destroyed in World War II and rebuilt afterwards. A separate Lutheran parish from Skoczów was created in 1994.
