= Międzyrzecze Górne =

- Village
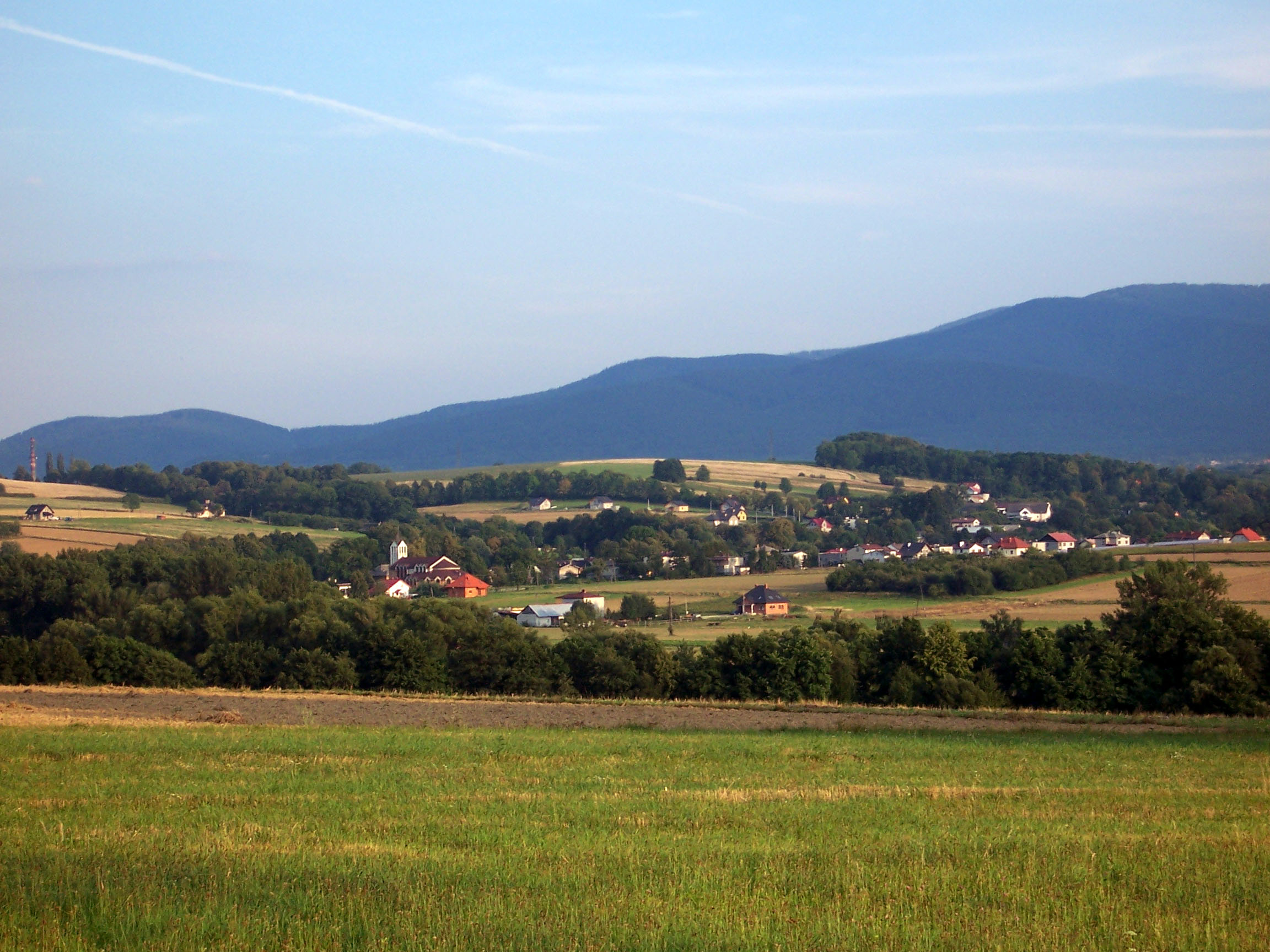
- View of Międzyrzecze Górne

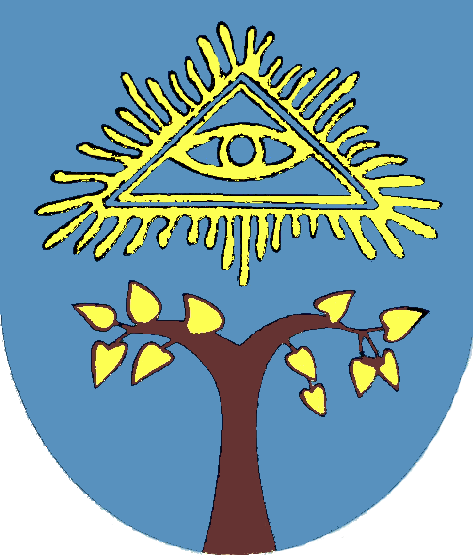
- Coat of arms

- Location within Poland
- Coordinates: 49°50′30″N 18°56′24″E
- Country: Poland
- Voivodeship: Silesian
- County: Bielsko
- Gmina: Jasienica
- First mentioned: ca. 1305

Government
  - Mayor: Maria Głuc-Mrzyk

Area
  - Total: 12.513 km^{2} (4.831 sq mi)

Population (2016)
  - Total: 2,652
  - Density: 211.9/km^{2} (548.9/sq mi)
- Time zone: UTC+1 (CET)
  - Summer (DST): UTC+2 (CEST)
- Postal code: 43-392
- Car plates: SBI
- Website: http://www.miedzyrzecze.org.pl/

Międzyrzecze Górne [mjɛnd͡zɨˈʐɛt͡ʂɛ ˈɡurnɛ] is a village in Gmina Jasienica, Bielsko County, Silesian Voivodeship, southern Poland.

== Etymology ==
The name Międzyrzecze is of topographic origin and literally means [a place] between rivers (Polish: między rzekami). There are two rivers flowing through the village: Jasienica and Wapienica. The adjective Górne (German: Ober) means upper.

== History ==
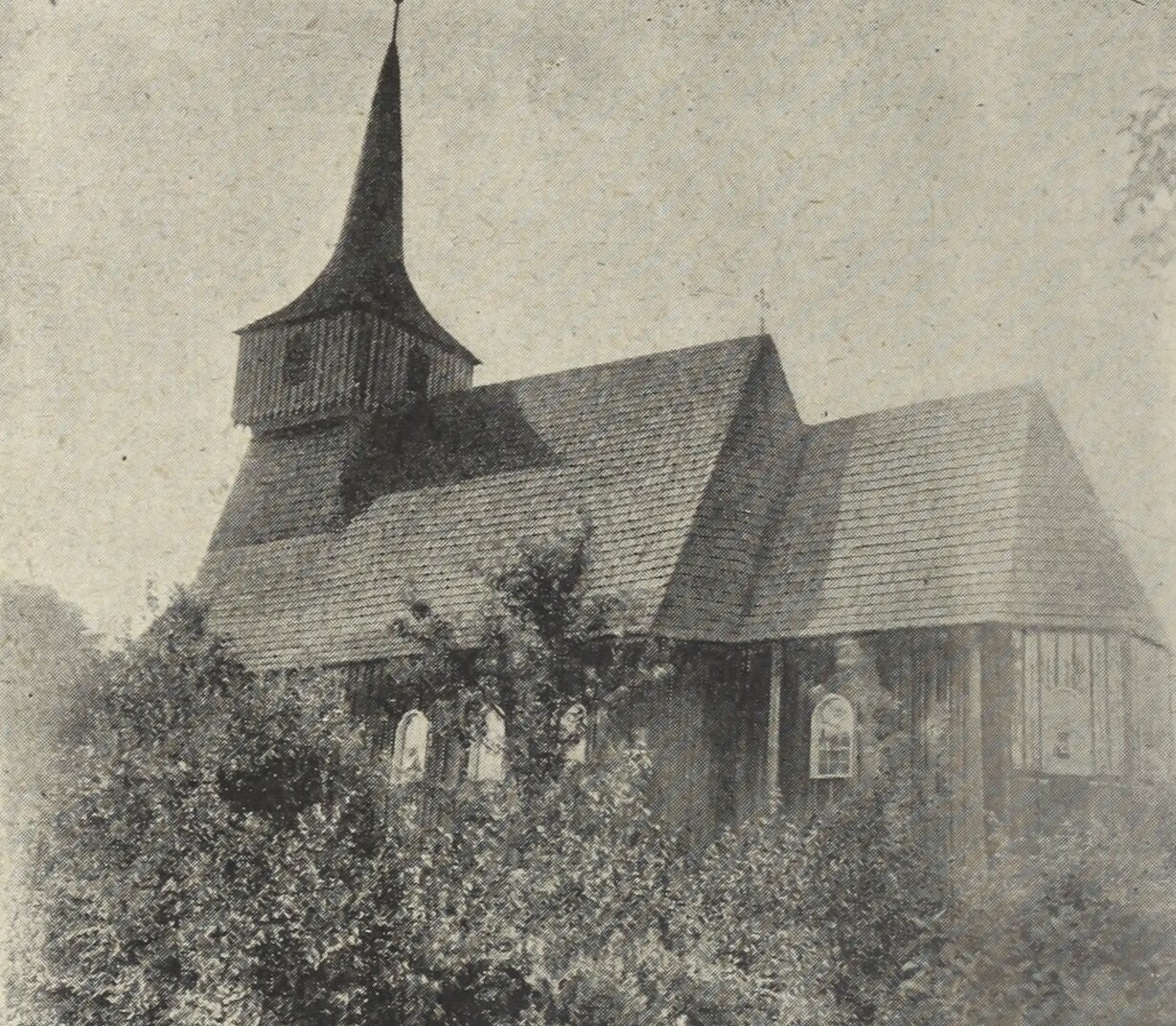
Old Saint Martin church, before 1932

The village lies in the historical region of Cieszyn Silesia. The settlement called Międzyrzecze was first mentioned in a Latin document of Diocese of Wrocław called Liber fundationis episcopatus Vratislaviensis from around 1305 as item in Mesisrozha debent esse XL mansi solubiles. It meant that the village was supposed to pay a tithe from 40 greater lans. The creation of the village was a part of a larger settlement campaign taking place in the late 13th century on the territory of what would later be known as Upper Silesia.

Politically the village belonged initially to the Duchy of Teschen, formed in 1290 in the process of feudal fragmentation of Poland and was ruled by a local branch of Silesian Piast dynasty. In 1327 the duchy became a fee of Kingdom of Bohemia, which after 1526 became part of the Habsburg monarchy.

In the second quarter of the 15th century a number of Germans settled here and formed a settlement called Konradiswalde (Konrad's wood), which later was known as Kurzwald, and eventually as Międzyrzecze Górne.

The village became a seat of a Catholic parish first mentioned in the register of Peter's Pence payment from 1447 among the 50 parishes of Teschen deanery as Conradsvalde. After 1540s Protestant Reformation prevailed in the Duchy of Teschen and a local Catholic church was taken over by Lutherans. It was taken from them (as one from around fifty buildings) in the region by a special commission and given back to the Roman Catholic Church on 16 April 1654. In spite of being bereft of place of worship many of the local inhabitants remained to be Lutherans. A Lutheran church was built in 1866. A wooden Catholic Saint Martin church built in 16th century accidentally burnt down in 1993; a modern church was built in its place in 1996.

After the Revolutions of 1848 in the Austrian Empire a modern municipal division was introduced in the re-established Austrian Silesia. The village as a municipality was subscribed to the political and legal district of Bielsko. According to the censuses conducted in 1880, 1890, 1900 and 1910 the population of the municipality grew from 1466 in 1880 to 1642 in 1910 with the majority being native German-speakers (at least 909 or 62% in 1880, at most 1092 or 66.5% in 1910) accompanied by a Polish-speaking minority (at most 555 or 37.9% in 1880, at least 550 or 33.5% in 1910). In terms of religion in 1910 majority were Protestants (68.6%), followed by Roman Catholics (30%) and Jews (23 or 1.4%). It was then considered to be a part of a German language island around Bielsko (German: Bielitz-Bialaer Sprachinsel).

After World War I, the fall of Austria-Hungary, the Polish–Czechoslovak War and the division of Cieszyn Silesia in 1920, it became a part of Poland. It was then annexed by Nazi Germany at the beginning of World War II. After the war it was restored to Poland.
