= Grodziec, Silesian Voivodeship =

Grodziec
- Village
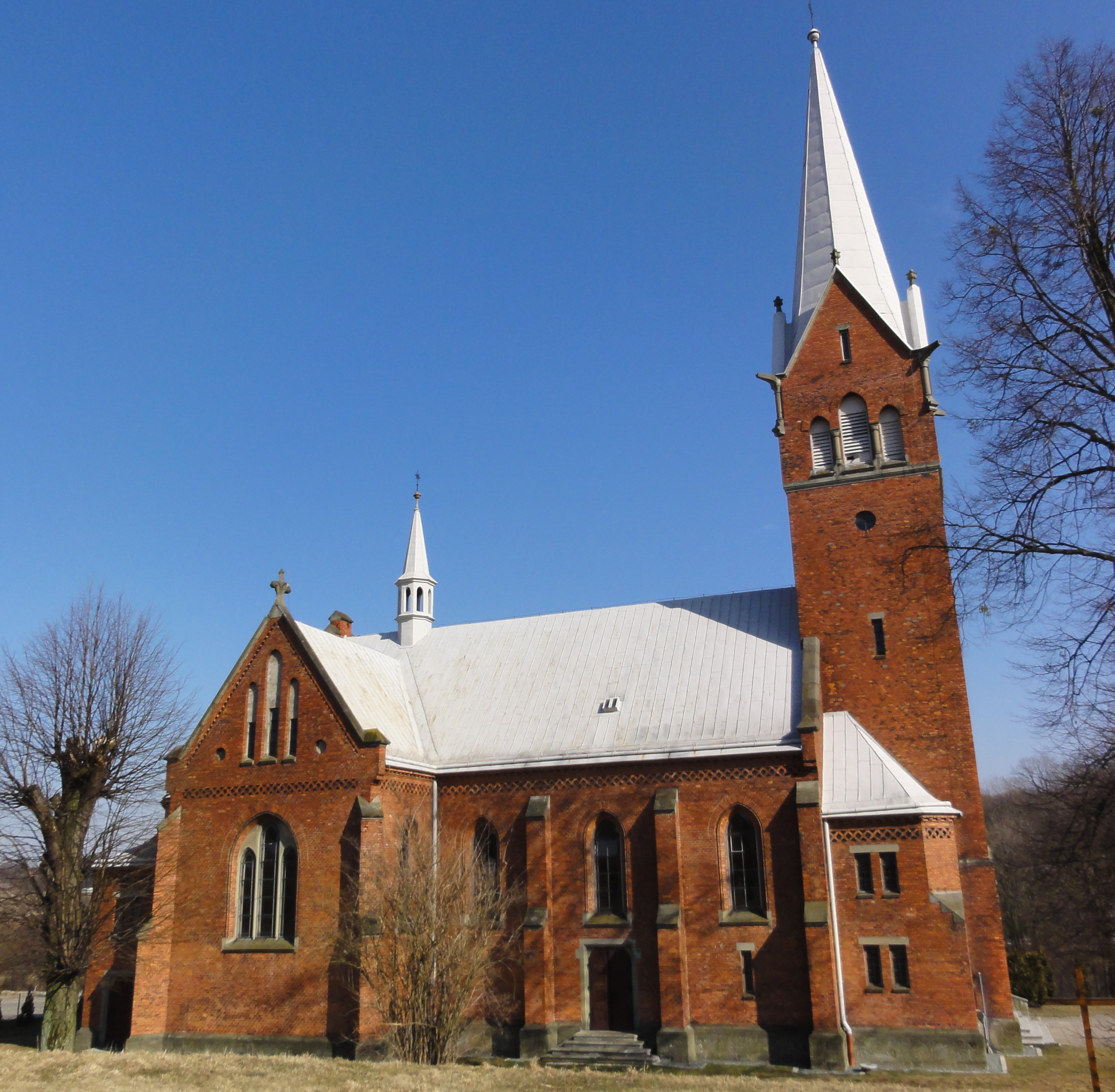
- Church of Saint Bartholomew

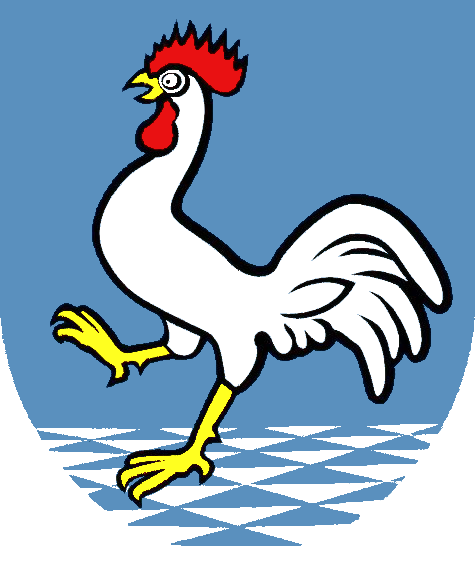
- Coat of arms

- Location within Poland
- Coordinates: 49°48′1.26″N 18°52′4.16″E
- Country: Poland
- Voivodeship: Silesian
- County: Bielsko
- Gmina: Jasienica
- First mentioned: 1305

Government
  - Mayor: Jadwiga Greń

Area
  - Total: 9.75 km^{2} (3.76 sq mi)

Population (2016)
  - Total: 1,256
  - Density: 129/km^{2} (334/sq mi)
- Time zone: UTC+1 (CET)
  - Summer (DST): UTC+2 (CEST)
- Car plates: SBI

Grodziec [ˈɡrɔd͡ʑɛt͡s] is a village in Gmina Jasienica, Bielsko County, Silesian Voivodeship, southern Poland. It lies in the historical region of Cieszyn Silesia.

== History ==
The village was first mentioned in a Latin document of Diocese of Wrocław called Liber fundationis episcopatus Vratislaviensis from around 1305 as item in Grodische villa Snessonis. However it was written in an atypical form and suggests that a village was older. There should be another village named similarly, and even older from Snesson's village. Because Grodische villa Snessonis was listed among villages located between Skoczów and Czechowice it is undoubtedly linked to nowadays Grodziec, whereas the other Grodische, not mentioned in Liber fundationis... is associated with Grodziszcz, in Czech Hradiště, now part of Těrlicko in the Czech Republic. The name of the villages suggests that there existed a fortified wooden gord. It was later rebuilt to a manor house, and to a château in 1542-1580.

Politically the village belonged initially to the Duchy of Teschen, formed in 1290 in the process of feudal fragmentation of Poland and was ruled by a local branch of Piast dynasty. In 1327 the duchy became a fee of the Kingdom of Bohemia, which after 1526 became part of the Habsburg monarchy.

The village became a seat of a Catholic parish, mentioned in the register of Peter's Pence payment from 1447 among 50 parishes of Teschen deanery as Grodecz.

After 1540s Protestant Reformation prevailed in the Duchy of Teschen and a local Catholic church was taken over by Lutherans. It was taken from them (as one from around fifty buildings) in the region by a special commission and given back to the Roman Catholic Church on 18 April 1654. It is now served by Saint Bartholomew Church.

After Revolutions of 1848 in the Austrian Empire a modern municipal division was introduced in the re-established Austrian Silesia. The village as a municipality was subscribed to the political district of Bielsko and the legal district of Skoczów. According to the censuses conducted in 1880, 1890, 1900 and 1910 the population of the municipality grew from 619 in 1880 to 569 in 1910, with majority of the inhabitants being native Polish-speakers (94%-97.6%) and minority German- (most 5.5% in 1900) and Czech-speaking (most 1.1% in 1890), and mostly Roman Catholics (91.5% in 1910), followed by Protestants (8.3% in 1910). The village was also traditionally inhabited by Cieszyn Vlachs, speaking Cieszyn Silesian dialect.

After World War I, fall of Austria-Hungary, Polish–Czechoslovak War and the division of Cieszyn Silesia in 1920, it became a part of Poland. It was then annexed by Nazi Germany at the beginning of World War II. After the war it was restored to Poland.
