= Gmina Jasienica =

Gmina Jasienica Jasienica Commune
- Gmina
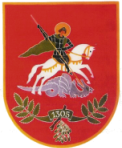
- Coat of arms

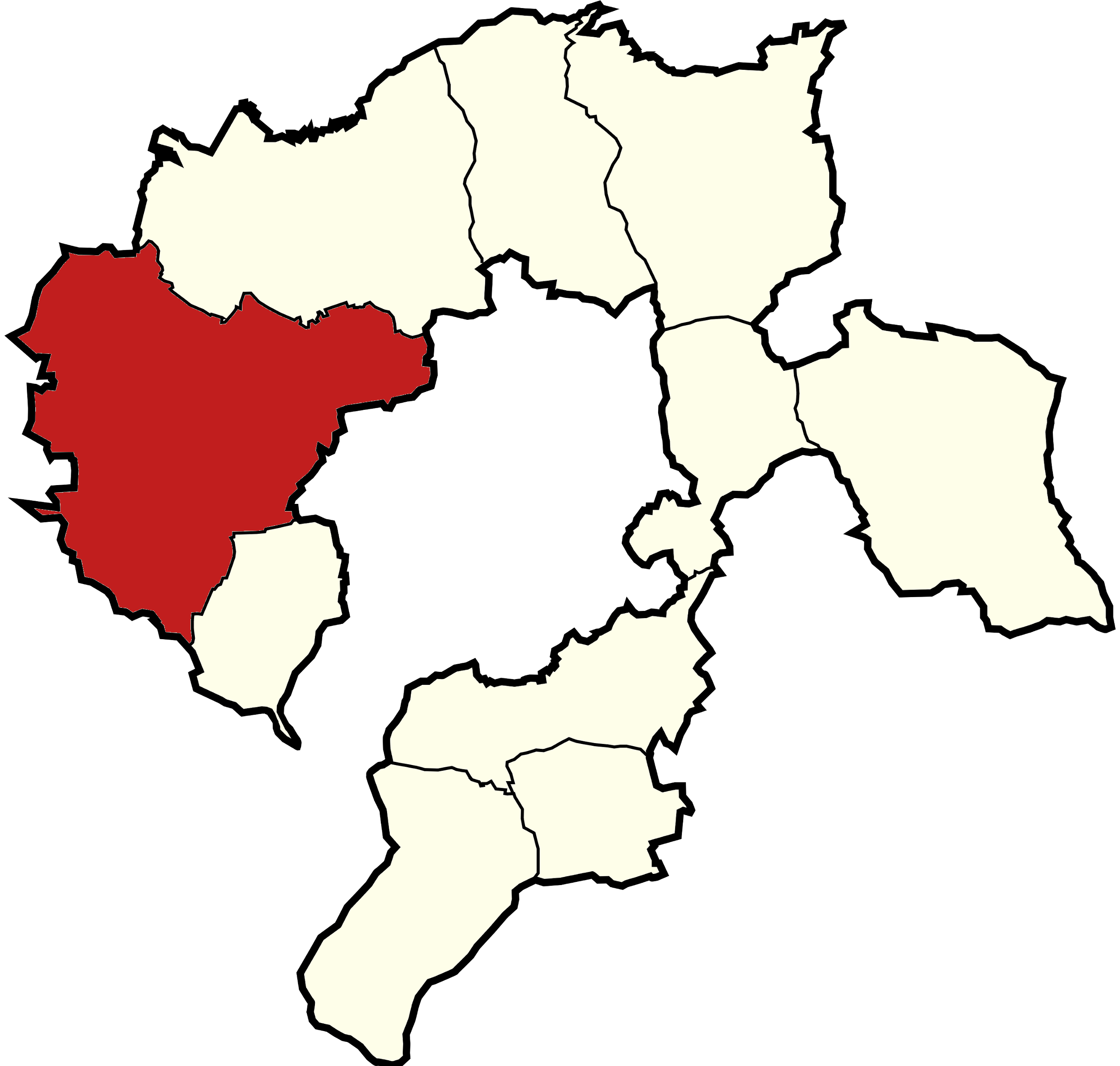
- Gmina Jasienica within the Bielsko County
- Coordinates (Jasienica): 49°48′46″N 18°55′14″E
- Country: Poland
- Voivodeship: Silesian
- County: Bielsko
- Seat: Jasienica

Government
  - Mayor: Janusz Pierzyna

Area
  - Total: 91.71 km^{2} (35.41 sq mi)

Population (2019-06-30)
  - Total: 24,264
  - Density: 264.6/km^{2} (685.2/sq mi)
- Website: http://www.jasienica.pl/

Gmina Jasienica is a rural gmina (administrative district) in Bielsko County, Silesian Voivodeship, in southern Poland, in the historical region of Cieszyn Silesia. Its seat is the village of Jasienica.

The gmina covers an area of 91.714 square kilometres (35.4 sq mi), and as of 2019 its total population is 24,264.

== Villages ==
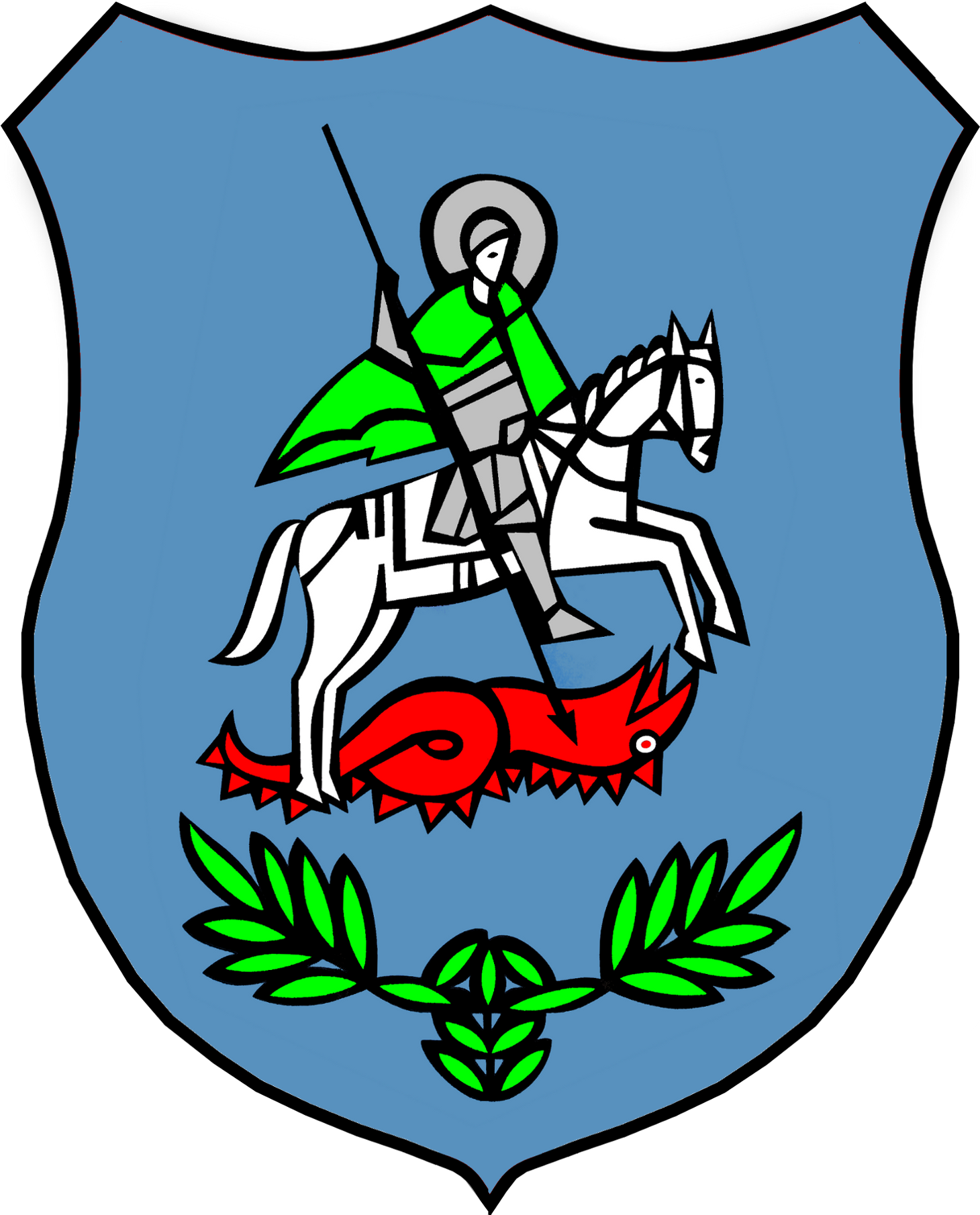
Jasienica (seat)

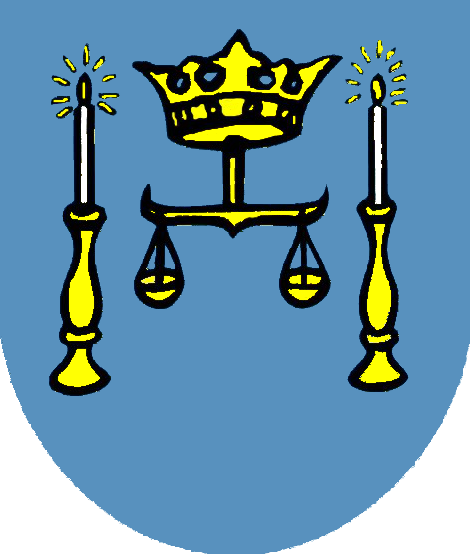
Mazańcowice

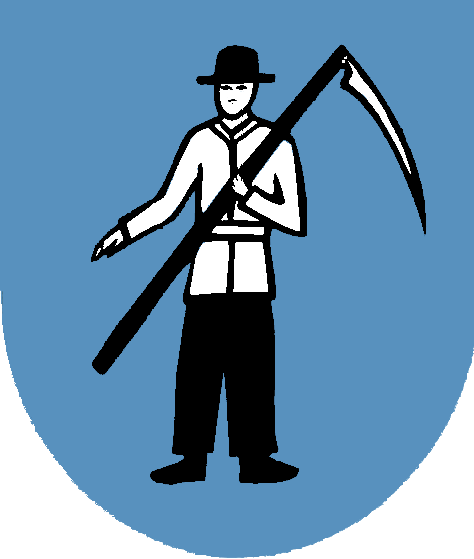
Rudzica

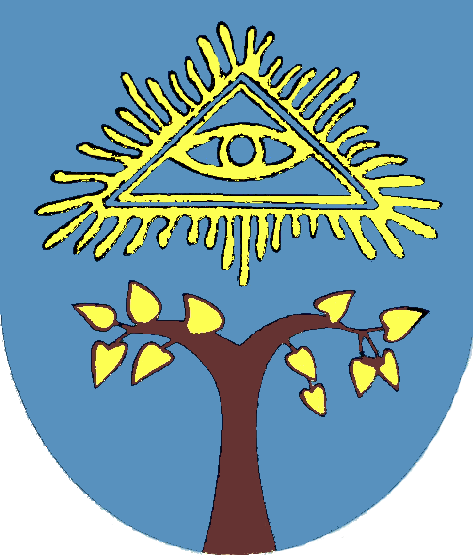
Międzyrzecze Górne

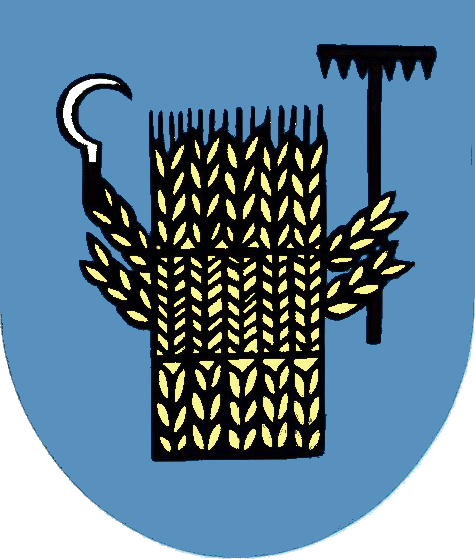
Międzyrzecze Dolne

Biery

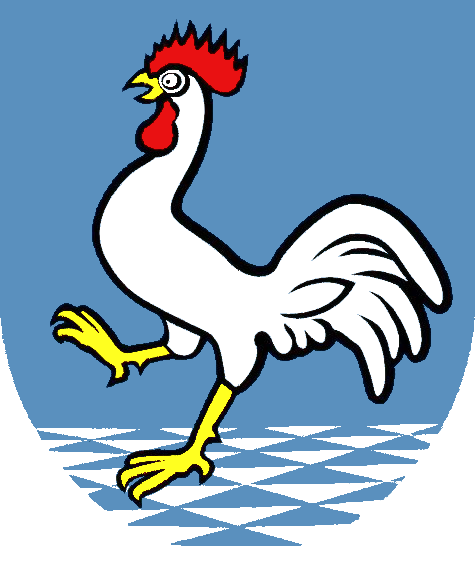
Grodziec

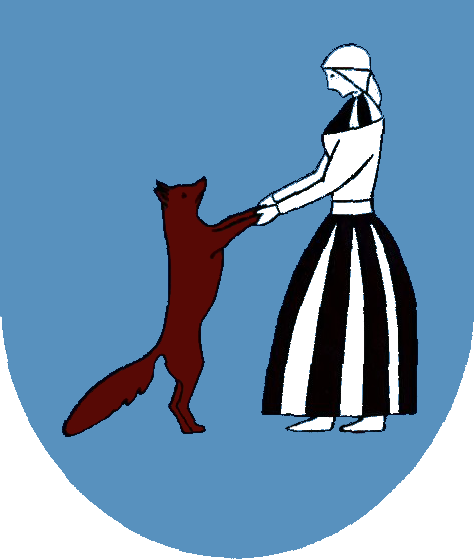
Iłownica

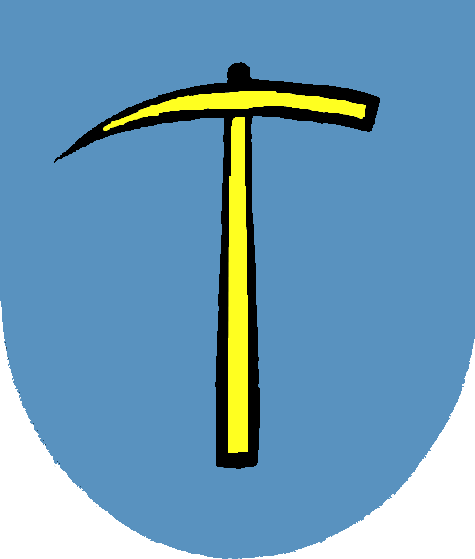
Łazy

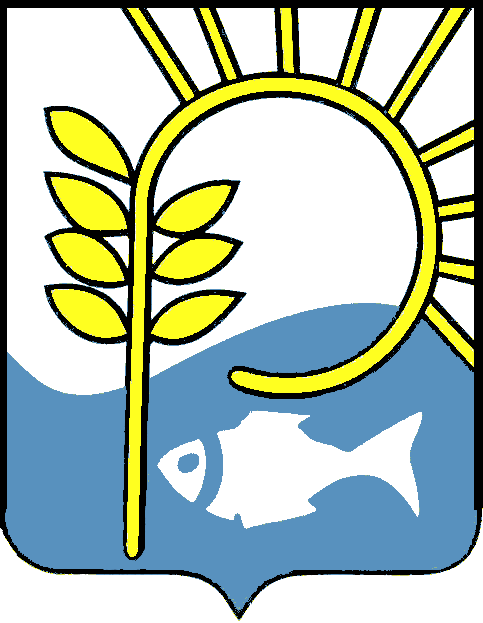
Roztropice

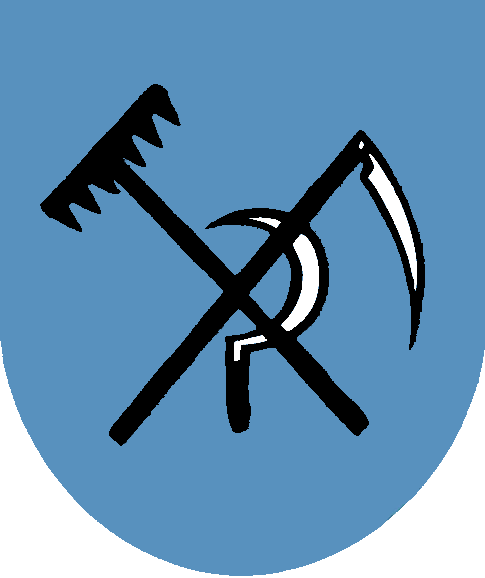
Świętoszówka

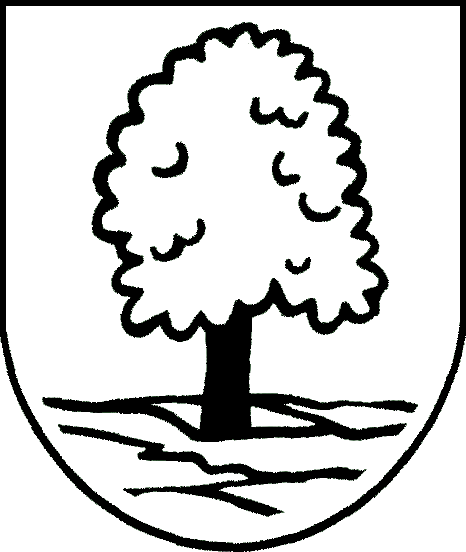
Bielowicko

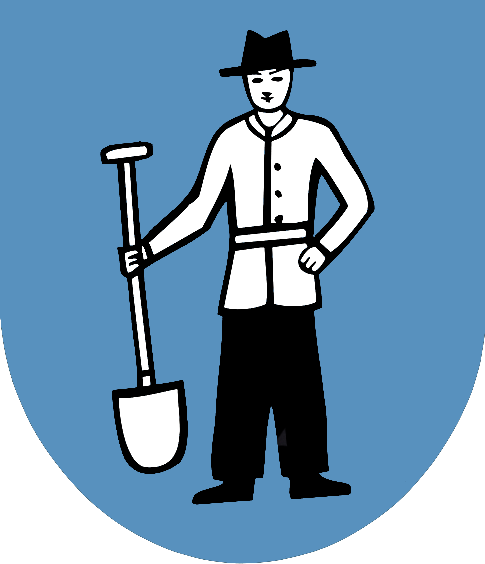
Landek

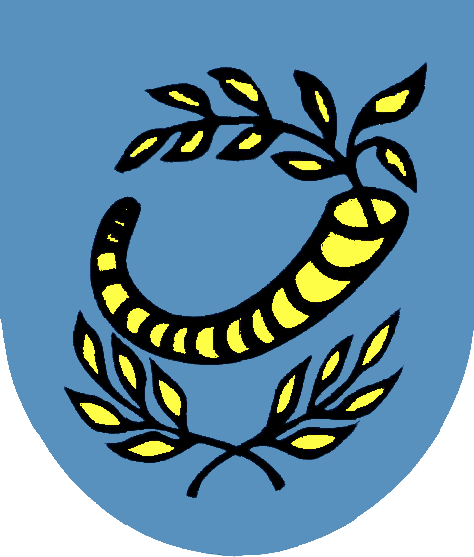
Wieszczęta

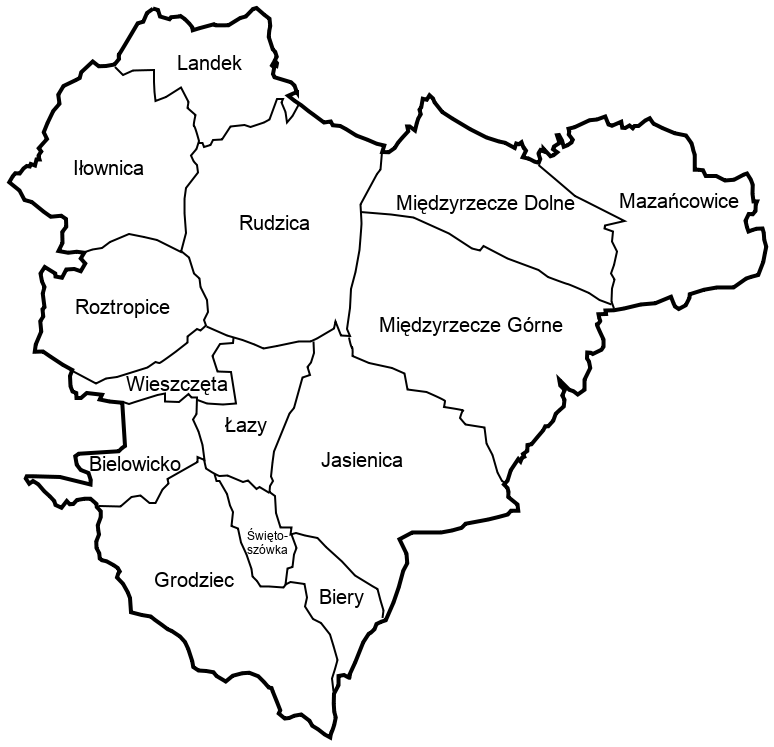
Division of the gmina

== Neighbouring gminas ==
Gmina Jasienica is bordered by the gminas of Bielsko-Biała, Brenna, Chybie, Czechowice-Dziedzice, Jaworze and Skoczów.

== Twin towns – sister cities ==
Gmina Jasienica is twinned with:

- Petřvald, Czech Republic
