= Gmina Jaworze =

Gmina Jaworze Jaworze Commune
- Gmina
- Flag Coat of arms

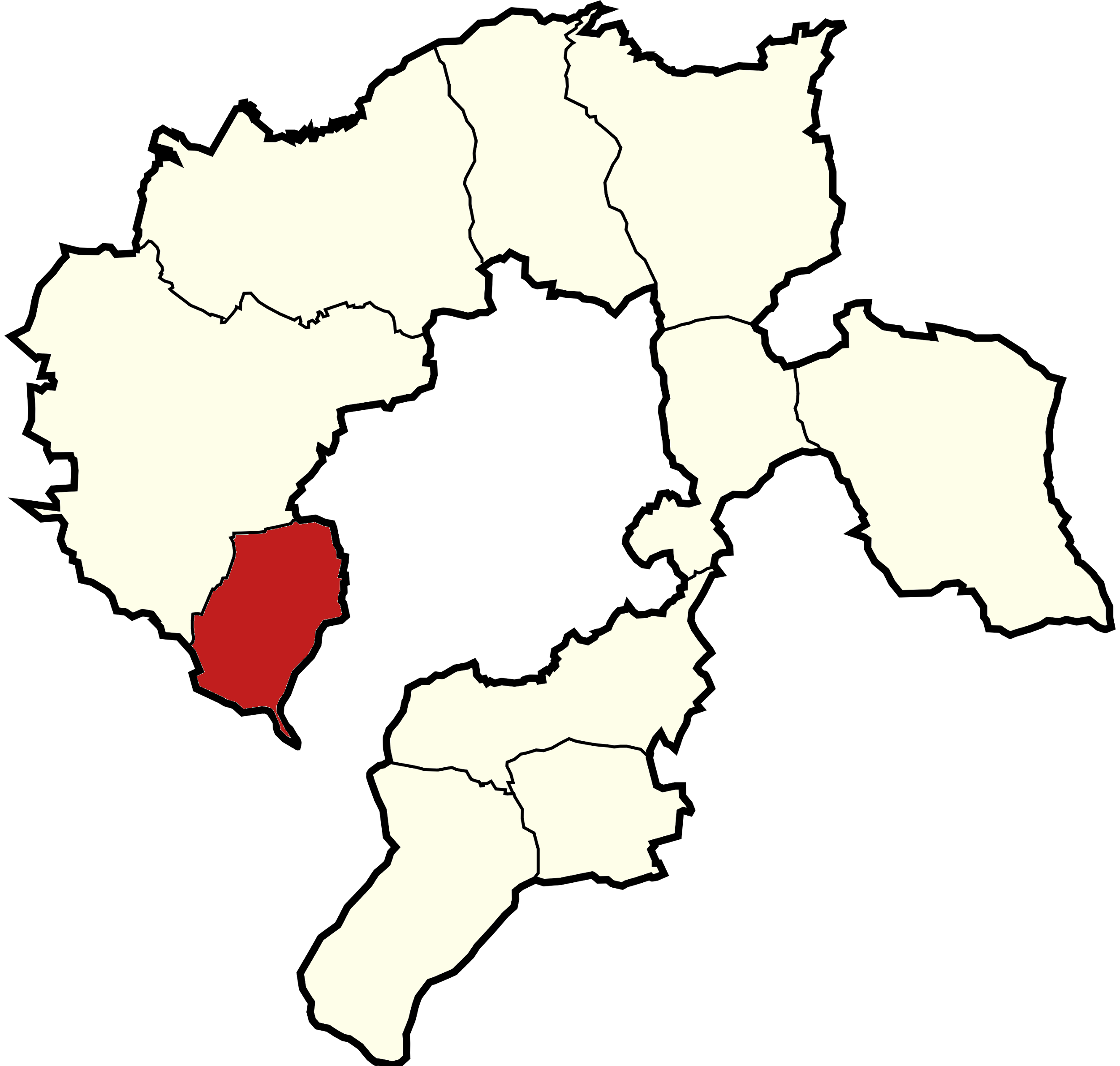
- Gmina Jaworze within the Bielsko County
- Coordinates (Jaworze): 49°48′22″N 18°56′32″E
- Country: Poland
- Voivodeship: Silesian
- County: Bielsko
- Seat: Jaworze

Government
  - Mayor: Radosław Ostałkiewicz

Area
  - Total: 21.32 km^{2} (8.23 sq mi)

Population (2019-06-30)
  - Total: 7,330
  - Density: 344/km^{2} (890/sq mi)
- Website: http://www.jaworze.pl

Gmina Jaworze is a rural gmina (administrative district) in Bielsko County, Silesian Voivodeship, in southern Poland. Its seat is the village of Jaworze, which lies approximately 10 kilometres (6 mi) west of Bielsko-Biała and 50 km (31 mi) south of the regional capital Katowice.

The gmina covers an area of 21.32 square kilometres (8.2 sq mi), and as of 2019 its total population is 7,330.

== Villages ==
The gmina is divided into four settlements: Jaworze Średnie (Middle Jaworze), Jaworze Górne (Upper Jaworze), Jaworze Dolne (Lower Jaworze) and Jaworze Nałęże.

== Neighbouring gminas ==
Gmina Jaworze is bordered by the city of Bielsko-Biała and by the gminas of Brenna and Jasienica.
