= Josef Božek =

Czech-Polish engineer and investor

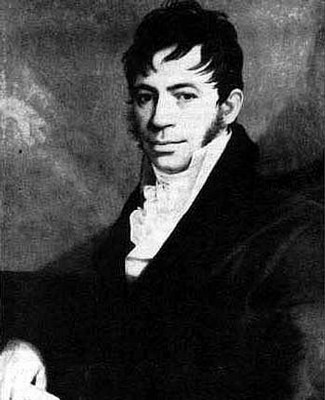
Josef Božek

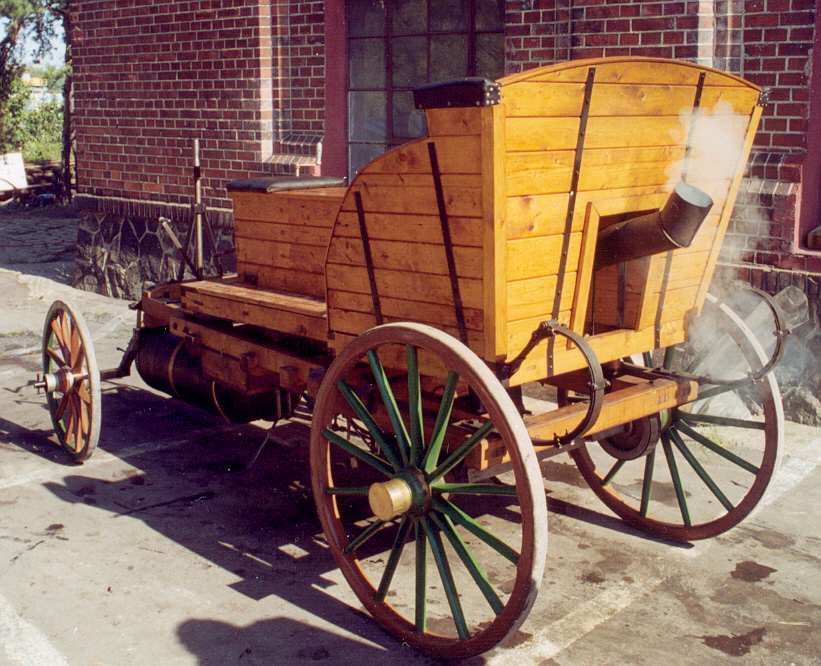
Replica of Božek's steam car

Josef Božek (Polish: Józef Bożek; 28 February 1782 in Biery – 21 October 1835 in Prague) was a Czech-Polish engineer and inventor. Born in the region of Cieszyn Silesia, he is considered one of founders of Czech mechanics. He put into operation one of the first steam engines in the Czech lands. His sons, František and Romuald, also became accomplished engineers.
