= Bielowicko =

- Village
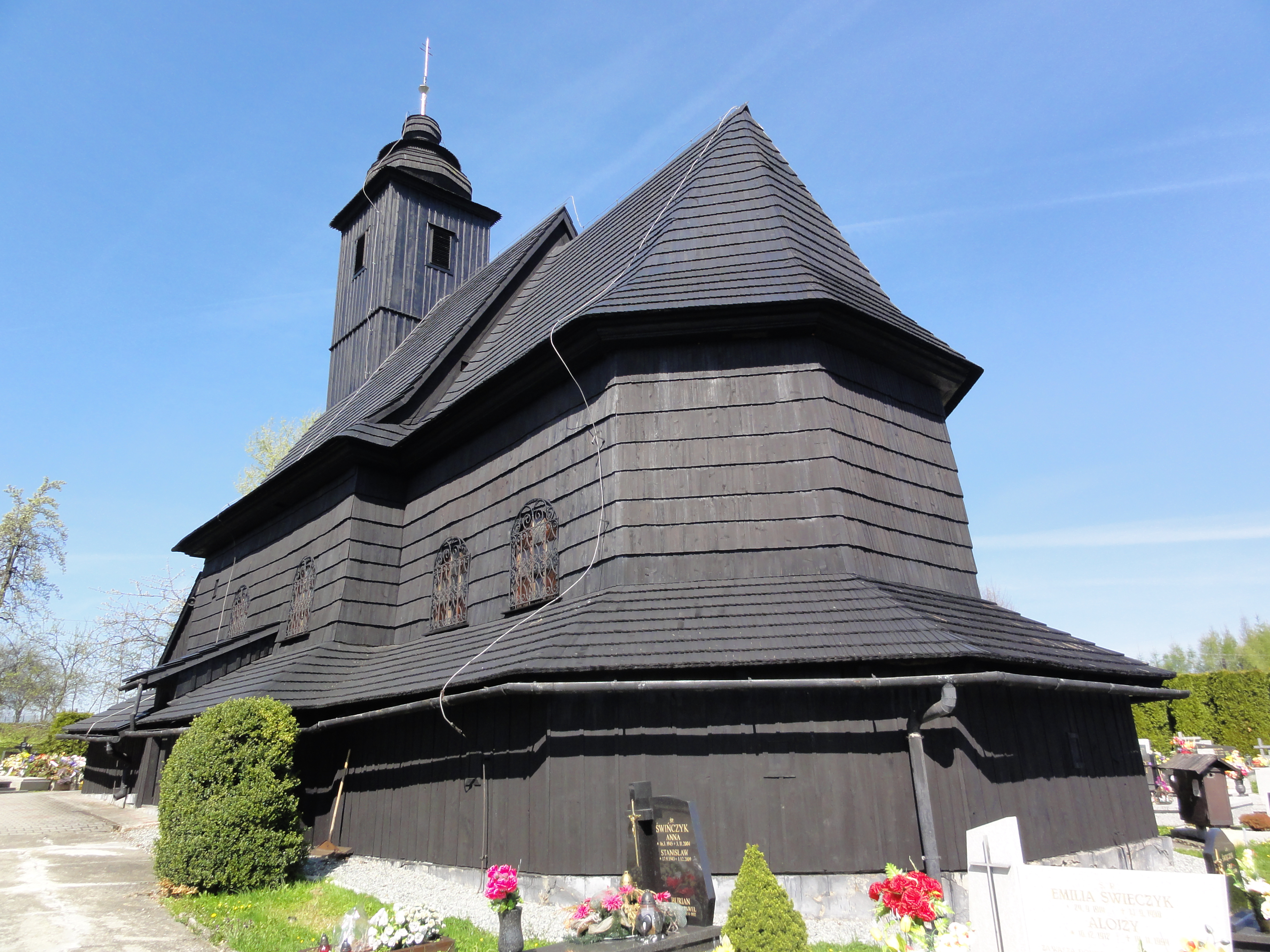
- Saint Lawrence Church

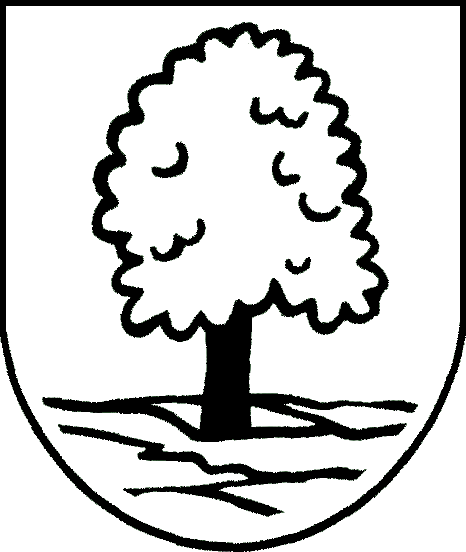
- Coat of arms

- Location within Poland
- Coordinates: 49°49′5.9″N 18°51′23.93″E
- Country: Poland
- Voivodeship: Silesian
- County: Bielsko
- Gmina: Jasienica
- First mentioned: 1223

Government
  - Mayor: Wojciech Śleziak

Area
  - Total: 3.116 km^{2} (1.203 sq mi)

Population (2016)
  - Total: 622
  - Density: 200/km^{2} (517/sq mi)
- Time zone: UTC+1 (CET)
  - Summer (DST): UTC+2 (CEST)
- Car plates: SBI

Bielowicko [bjɛlɔˈvit͡skɔ] is a village in Gmina Jasienica, Bielsko County, Silesian Voivodeship, southern Poland.

The village lies in the Silesian Foothills, in the historical region of Cieszyn Silesia.

== History ==
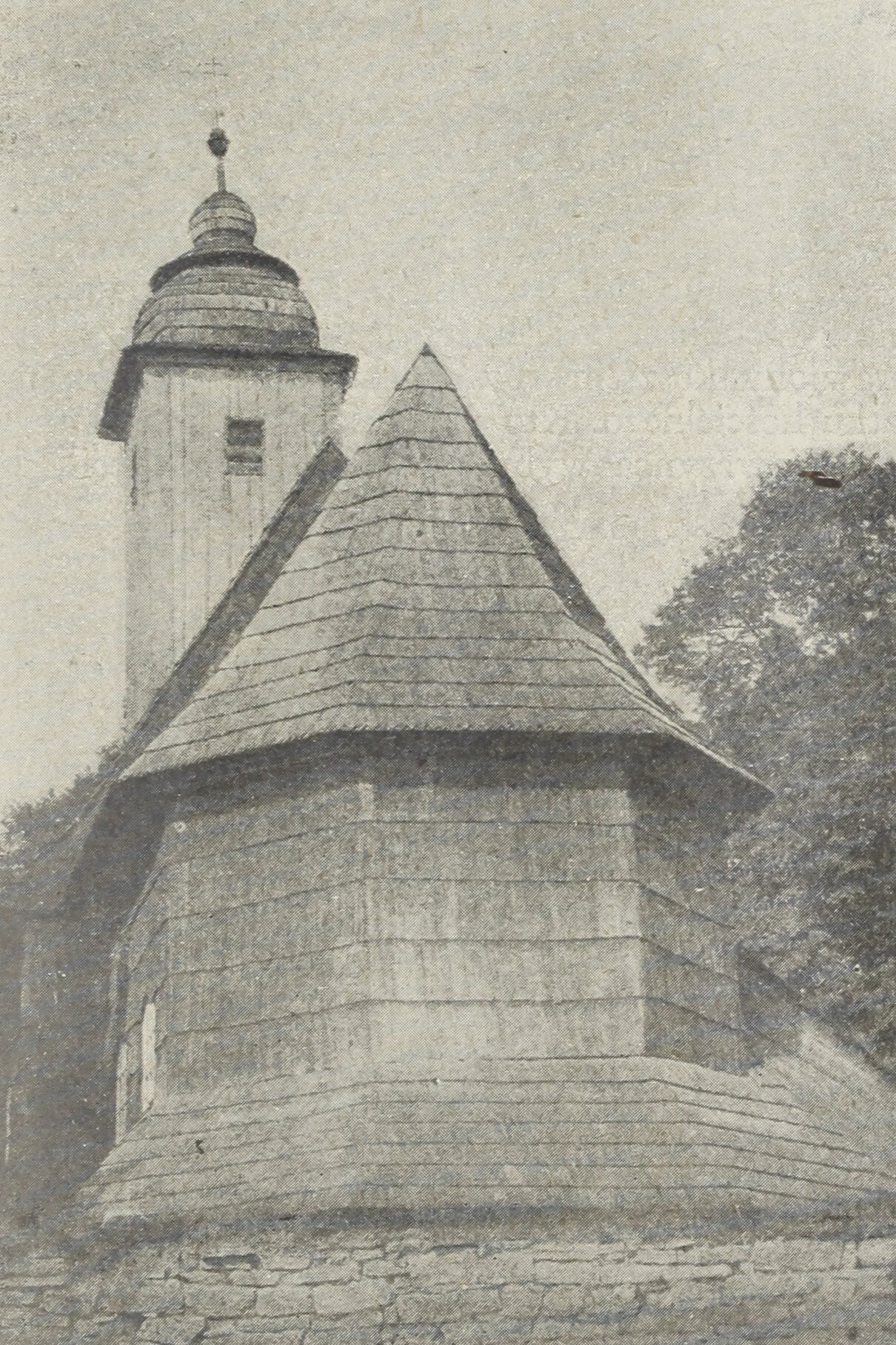
Saint Lawrence church, before 1932

It was first mentioned in a document of Bishop of Wrocław issued on 23 May 1223 for Norbertine Sisters in Rybnik among villages paying them a tithe, as Beleuisco/ (Beloviezo).

Politically it belonged then to the Duchy of Opole and Racibórz and the Castellany of Cieszyn, which was in 1290 formed in the process of feudal fragmentation of Poland into the Duchy of Teschen, ruled by a local branch of Silesian Piast dynasty. In 1327 the duchy became a fee of the Kingdom of Bohemia, which after 1526 became a part of the Habsburg monarchy.

After Revolutions of 1848 in the Austrian Empire a modern municipal division was introduced in the re-established Austrian Silesia. The village as a municipality was subscribed to the political district of Bielsko and the legal district of Skoczów. According to the censuses conducted in 1880, 1890, 1900 and 1910 the population of the village grew from 235 in 1880 to 283 in 1910, with majority of the inhabitants being native Polish-speakers (98.7%-100%) of Catholic faith (99% in 1910). The village was also traditionally inhabited by Cieszyn Vlachs, speaking Cieszyn Silesian dialect.

After the World War I, fall of Austria-Hungary, Polish–Czechoslovak War and division of Cieszyn Silesia, the village became a part of the Second Polish Republic. After German invasion of Poland in 1939, the area became a part of Nazi Germany until 1945.

== Landmarks ==
- A wooden Saint Lawrence Church, built in the 17th century.
