= Lan (unit of measurement) =

Lan (Polish: łan [wan]; German: Lahn; Latin: laneus) is an old unit of field measurement used in Central Europe since the 13th century, its value has varied from one location to another. In Poland a greater łan (also Franconian, King's, Old Polish) consisted of 43.2 morgs = 23 to 28 hectares. A lesser łan (Chełmno łan) was 30 morg ≈ 17,955 hectare.

The term eventually derives from German Lehen, "fee" (feudal land tenure). The term łan was also used to indicate an average size of a peasant's tenured farm. Łan was further subdivided into zagony ("belts") and further into skiby ("slices").

In medieval times the size of a łan was anywhere between 3 and 50 hectares, but from the 13th century to 1857 in Great Lesser Poland (with Podkarpacie), the Franconian Łan was consistently used.

Comparison of Area units in Lesser Poland 1791–1876, 1 Franconian morg = 1 Viennese morg (system morgi dolnoaustriackiej)
Unit	Miara(Unit)	Sążeń², (Viennese fathom²)	Łokieć² (Viennese ell²)	m^{2}
1 morg (morgen) (= 0.5755 ha)	3	1600	6439.02	5754.64
1 miara (Unit) (= 19.18 are)		533.33	2929.07	1918
1 sążeń² wiedeński (Viennese fathom)			4.0237	3.6
1 łokieć² wiedeński (Viennese el²)				0.9
