= Liber fundationis episcopatus Vratislaviensis =

Manuscript catalog

- Date: ~1305
- Language: Medieval Latin

Liber fundationis episcopatus Vratislaviensis (Polish: Księga uposażeń biskupstwa wrocławskiego, 'Book of endowments of the Bishopric of Wrocław') is a Latin manuscript catalog of documents compiled in the later 13th or in the early 14th century. It lists towns and villages obliged to pay a tithe to the Bishopric of Wrocław. As a primary source it helps to recreate territorial extent, structure and revenues of the contemporary Diocese of Wrocław, additionally hundreds of villages in Silesia were being attested for the first time in their history, hence the importance of the document. The exact date of the document is not determined, but most often it is believed to be compiled in 1305, during Henryk of Wierzbna bishophood, who tried to reorganize bishopric's finances.

The catalog is subdivided into five parts:

- Registrum Nissense (ecclesiastical Duchy of Nysa)
- Registrum Wratislaviense (Archdeaconry of Wrocław)
- Registrum Wyasdense (Archdeaconry of Opole/Ujazd)
- Registrum Legnicense (Archdeaconry of Legnica)
- Registrum Glogoviense (Archdeaconry of Głogów)
