= Bielsko County =

Coordinates: 49°49′N 19°02′E

Bielsko County Powiat bielski
- County
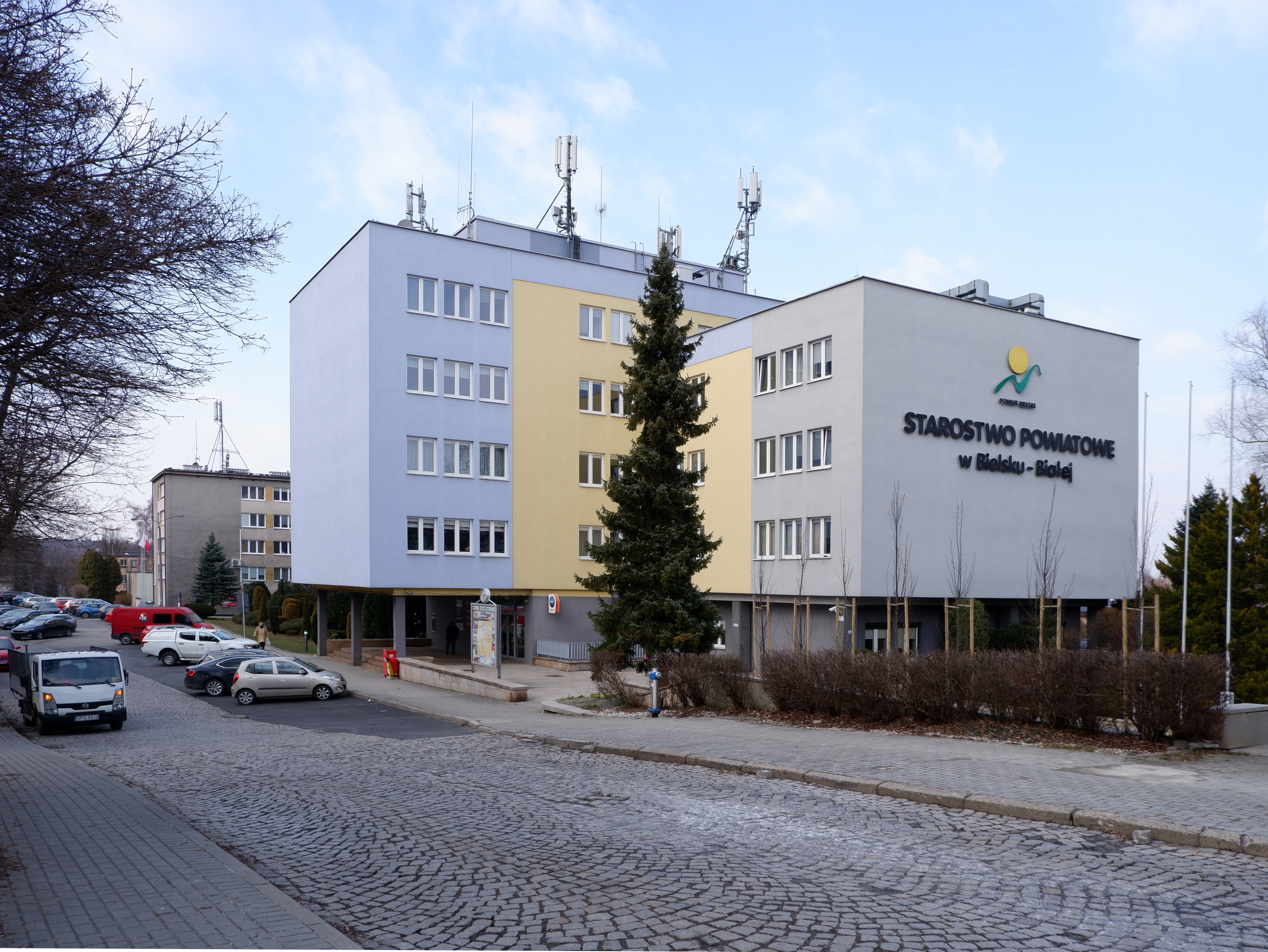
- County office building

- Flag Coat of arms

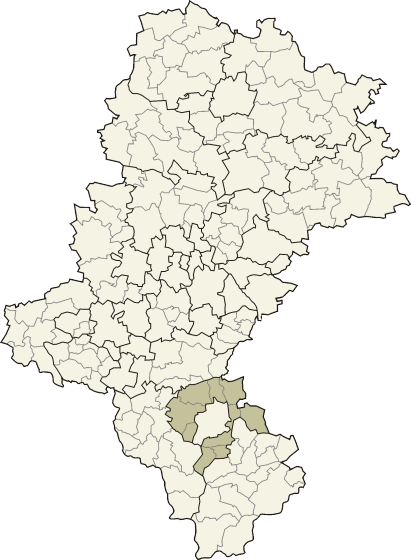
- Location within Silesian Voivodeship
- Country: Poland
- Voivodeship: Silesian
- Seat: Bielsko-Biała
- Gminas: Total 10 (incl. 1 urban): Szczyrk; Gmina Bestwina; Gmina Buczkowice; Gmina Czechowice-Dziedzice; Gmina Jasienica; Gmina Jaworze; Gmina Kozy; Gmina Porąbka; Gmina Wilamowice; Gmina Wilkowice

Government
  - Starosta: Andrzej Płonka

Area
  - Total: 457.2 km^{2} (176.5 sq mi)

Population (2019-06-30)
  - Total: 165,374
  - Density: 361.7/km^{2} (936.8/sq mi)
  - Urban: 44,760
  - Rural: 120,614
- Car plates: SBI
- Website: www.powiat.bielsko.pl

Bielsko County (Polish: powiat bielski) is a unit of territorial administration and local government (powiat) in Silesian Voivodeship, southern Poland. It came into being on January 1, 1999, as a result of the Polish local government reforms passed in 1998. Its administrative seat is the city of Bielsko-Biała, although the city is not part of the county (it constitutes a separate city county). The county contains three towns: Czechowice-Dziedzice, 13 km (8 mi) north-west of Bielsko-Biała, Szczyrk, 14 km (9 mi) south of Bielsko-Biała, and Wilamowice, 12 km (7 mi) north-east of Bielsko-Biała.

The county covers an area of 457.23 square kilometres (176.5 sq mi). As of 2019 its total population is 165,374, out of which the population of Czechowice-Dziedzice is 35,926, that of Szczyrk is 5,734, that of Wilamowice is 3,100, and the rural population is 120,614.

== Neighbouring counties ==
Apart from the city of Bielsko-Biała, Bielsko County is also bordered by Pszczyna County and Oświęcim County to the north, Wadowice County to the east, Żywiec County to the south, and Cieszyn County to the west.

== Administrative division ==
Map of Bielsko County

The county is subdivided into 10 gminas (one urban, two urban-rural and seven rural). These are listed in the following table, in descending order of population.

Gmina	Type	Area (km^{2})	Population (2019)	Seat
Gmina Czechowice-Dziedzice	urban-rural	66.3	45,451	Czechowice-Dziedzice
Gmina Jasienica	rural	91.7	24,264	Jasienica
Gmina Wilamowice	urban-rural	56.7	17,613	Wilamowice
Gmina Porąbka	rural	64.6	15,582	Porąbka
Gmina Wilkowice	rural	33.9	13,409	Wilkowice
Gmina Kozy	rural	26.9	12,979	Kozy
Gmina Bestwina	rural	37.6	11,816	Bestwina
Gmina Buczkowice	rural	19.3	11,196	Buczkowice
Gmina Jaworze	rural	21.3	7,330	Jaworze
Szczyrk	urban	39.1	5,734	

== See also ==
- Cieszyn Silesia
- Euroregion Cieszyn Silesia
