= Judicial district =

Administrative territorial entity

A judicial district or legal district denotes the territorial area for which a legal court (usually a district court) has jurisdiction.

== By continent ==
=== Europe ===
==== Austria ====
In texts concerning Austria, "judicial district" (German: Gerichtsbezirk) refers to the geographical area under the jurisdiction of a district court, the lowest-level kind of court. Austria is partitioned into 115 judicial districts.

==== Germany ====
In Germany, ordinary Gerichtsbarkeit courts are the smallest districts of those courts. There are superior court districts, which usually have several legal districts forming a regional district. Accordingly, the relationship between regional districts and the Oberlandesgericht is designed. To speak of a legal district of the Federal Court is superfluous, because that district would include the entire federal territory.

The rule that courts are only responsible in matters within their legal districts, however, must not be over-represented. The legal process takes a number of schemes under which also matters from a different legal district may be justified, or jurisdiction in those cases in which a domestic court normally is not present.

==== Portugal ====
The basic type of judicial division of Portugal is the comarca, corresponding to the territorial area of jurisdiction of a judicial court of first instance.

The judiciary organization reform of 2014 simplified the judicial division of Portugal, that until then included 231 comarcas, grouped in 57 círculos judiciais (judicial circles), by themselves grouped in four distritos judiciais (judicial districts). Depending on the size of its population, each comarca could have from a single judicial court of generic competence to a complex structure of diverse courts of specific competences (civil, criminal, criminal procedure, labor, family, etc.).

Since 2014, the country has the comarca as its single type of judicial division. Portugal is now divided in 23 larger comarcas, all of them having, each one, a single generic competence judicial court of first instance. Each judicial court is divided in several specialized sections.

The judicial courts of second instance and some specialized courts of first instance have jurisdiction over several comarcas.

=== North America ===
==== United States ====
For the purpose of the federal judiciary, each state is organized into between one and four judicial districts, which may be further subdivided into divisions. Each state is also independently divided into judicial districts or their equivalents for the purpose of its state judiciary. The Judiciary of New York, for example, has 13 judicial districts.
