= Simoradz =

- Village
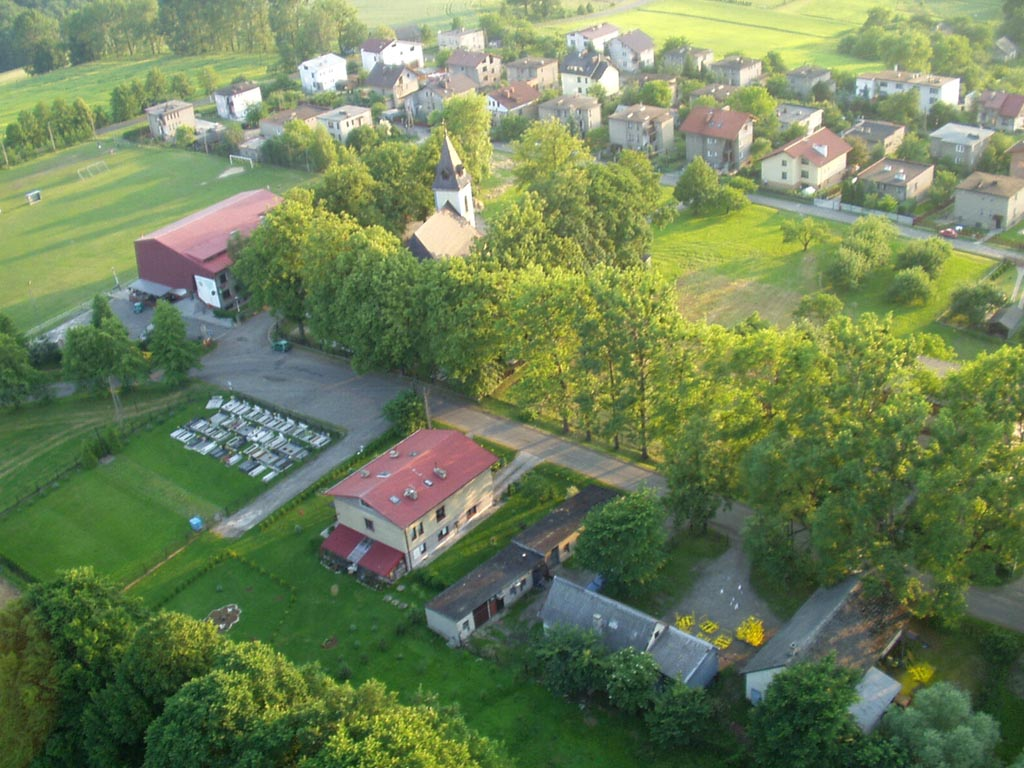
- Aerial view

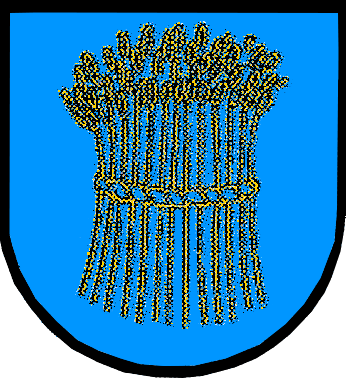
- Coat of arms

- Location within Poland
- Coordinates: 49°49′N 18°46′E
- Country: Poland
- Voivodeship: Silesian
- County: Cieszyn
- Gmina: Dębowiec
- First mentioned: 1286

Government
  - Mayor: Piotr Burawa

Area
  - Total: 6.9537 km^{2} (2.6848 sq mi)

Population (2006)
  - Total: 996
  - Density: 143/km^{2} (371/sq mi)
- Time zone: UTC+1 (CET)
  - Summer (DST): UTC+2 (CEST)
- Postal code: 43-426
- Car plates: SCI
- Website: Official website

Simoradz ([ɕiˈmɔrad͡z]; German: Schimoradz) is a village in Gmina Dębowiec, Cieszyn County, Silesian Voivodeship, southern Poland.

== Etymology ==
The name originates from a personal name Siemorad or according to another sources from old Moravian language "sim oradz", meaning to till a land.

== History ==
The village lies in the historical region of Cieszyn Silesia. It was first mentioned in a written document from 1286 as Semoradz, which recalls the local parson who supposedly read a curse on Henryk IV Probus in the church in Racibórz. Around 1300 the village was recolonised from Polish rights to German rights. It was again mentioned in a Latin document of Diocese of Wrocław called Liber fundationis episcopatus Vratislaviensis from around 1305 as item in Semoraz debent esse XX mansi, de quibus ad ecclesiam ibidem pertinent V) mansi ab antiquo. It meant that the village was supposed to pay a tithe from 20 greater lans, while 5(6?) where reserved for a local church since a yore.

The village belonged initially to the Duchy of Opole and Racibórz and the Castellany of Cieszyn, which was in the process of feudal fragmentation of Poland in 1290 formed into the Duchy of Teschen and was ruled by a local branch of Silesian Piast dynasty. In 1327 the duchy became a fee of the Kingdom of Bohemia, which after 1526 became a part of the Habsburg monarchy. Until the 16th century Simoradz was owned directly by Cieszyn dukes, then it belonged to noble families.

Local Catholic parish, undoubtedly one of the oldest in the region, was again attested in an incomplete register of Peter's Pence payment from 1335 as Zimoracz. It was again mentioned in the register of Peter's Pence payment from 1447 among 50 parishes of the Teschen deanery as Schimoradz. The current Saint James church was built in the 15th century. During the Protestant Reformation many of the local citizens changed their denomination to Lutheranism and took over the local church. It was returned to Catholics in 1654. The first school in Simoradz was established in 1763, and waited to 1793 for a dedicated building next to the church.

After the Revolutions of 1848 in the Austrian Empire (which led to abolition of feudalism) a modern municipal division was introduced in the re-established Austrian Silesia. The village as a municipality was subscribed to the political district of Bielsko and the legal district of Skoczów. It was ruled by an elected vogt (Polish: wójt), the first being Paweł Ciemała. In 1873 the new vogt was Ludwik Rużiczka, a merchant from Wien, who changed the official language of the gemeinde to German. Rużiczka was replaced by Jerzy Raszka in 1888, who made back Polish language official in municipality. He also wrote down a memoir of the municipality. A new school was built in 1903.

According to the censuses conducted in 1880, 1890, 1900 and 1910 the population of the municipality grew from 508 in 1880 to 569 in 1910 with a majority being native Polish-speakers (98.8–100%) and at most 6 or 1.2% German-speaking in 1880, in terms of religion the majority were Protestants (62.6% in 1910), followed by Roman Catholics (36.4% in 1910) and Jews (6 or 1% in 1910). The village was also traditionally inhabited by Cieszyn Vlachs, speaking Cieszyn Silesian dialect.

After World War I, the fall of Austria-Hungary, Polish–Czechoslovak War erupted. In 28 to 30 January 1919 the battle between Polish and Czechoslovak troops took place here. After the division of Cieszyn Silesia in 1920, the village became a part of Poland. In 1926-1928 local Lutherans built a cemetery chapel, since 1995 a Holy Spirit Church. It was then annexed by Nazi Germany at the beginning of World War II. After the war it was restored to Poland.

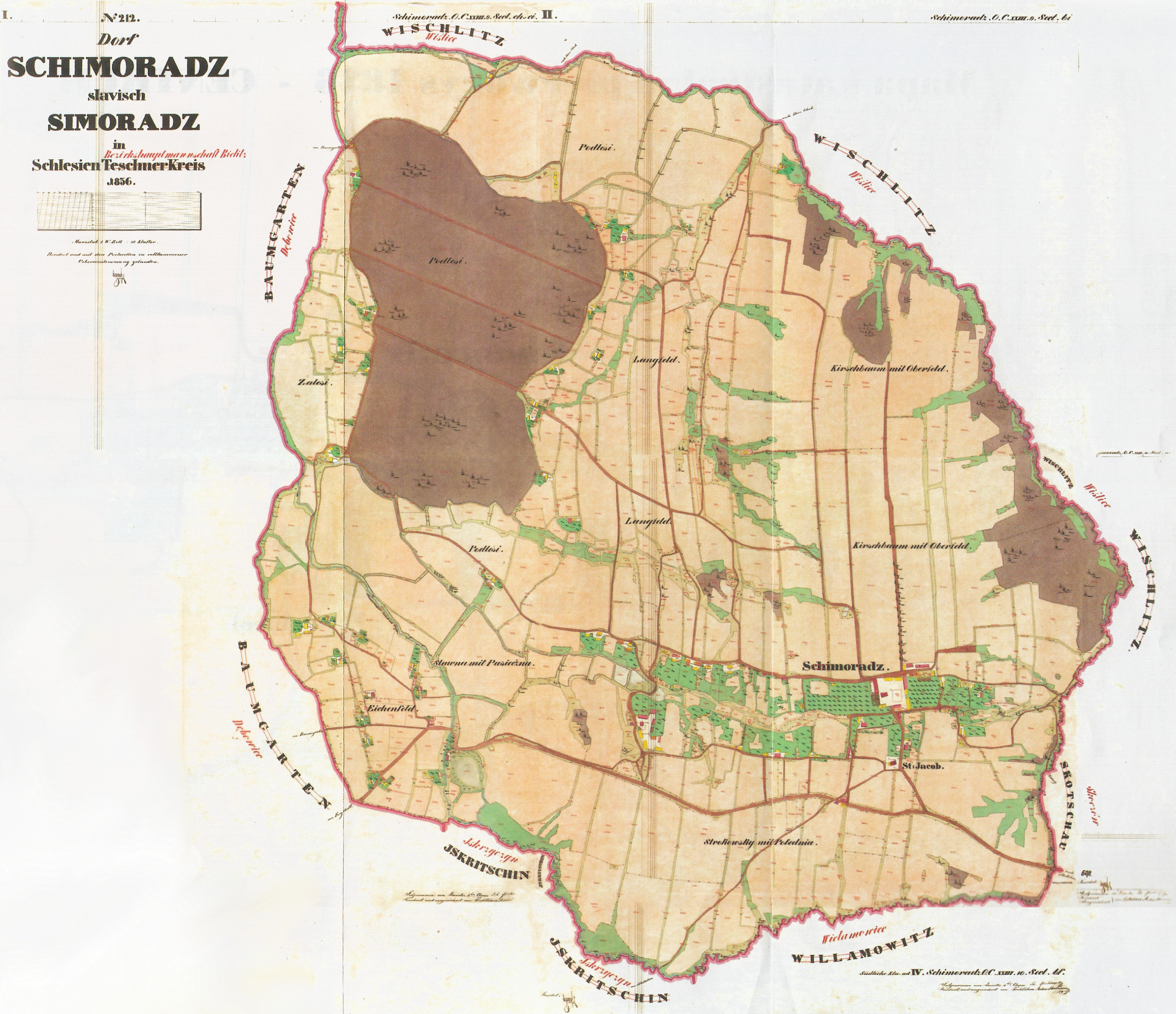
Map (1836)

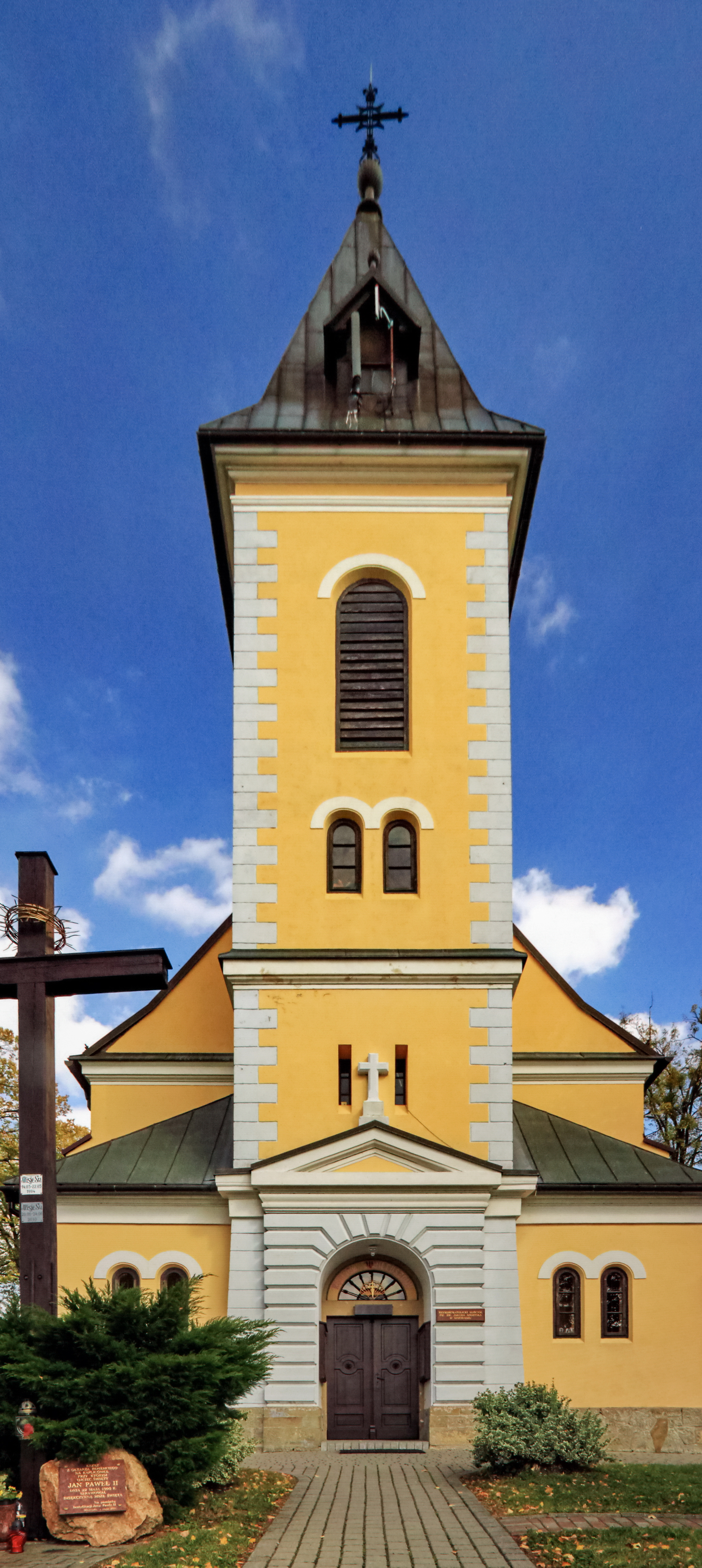
Saint James Catholic parish church

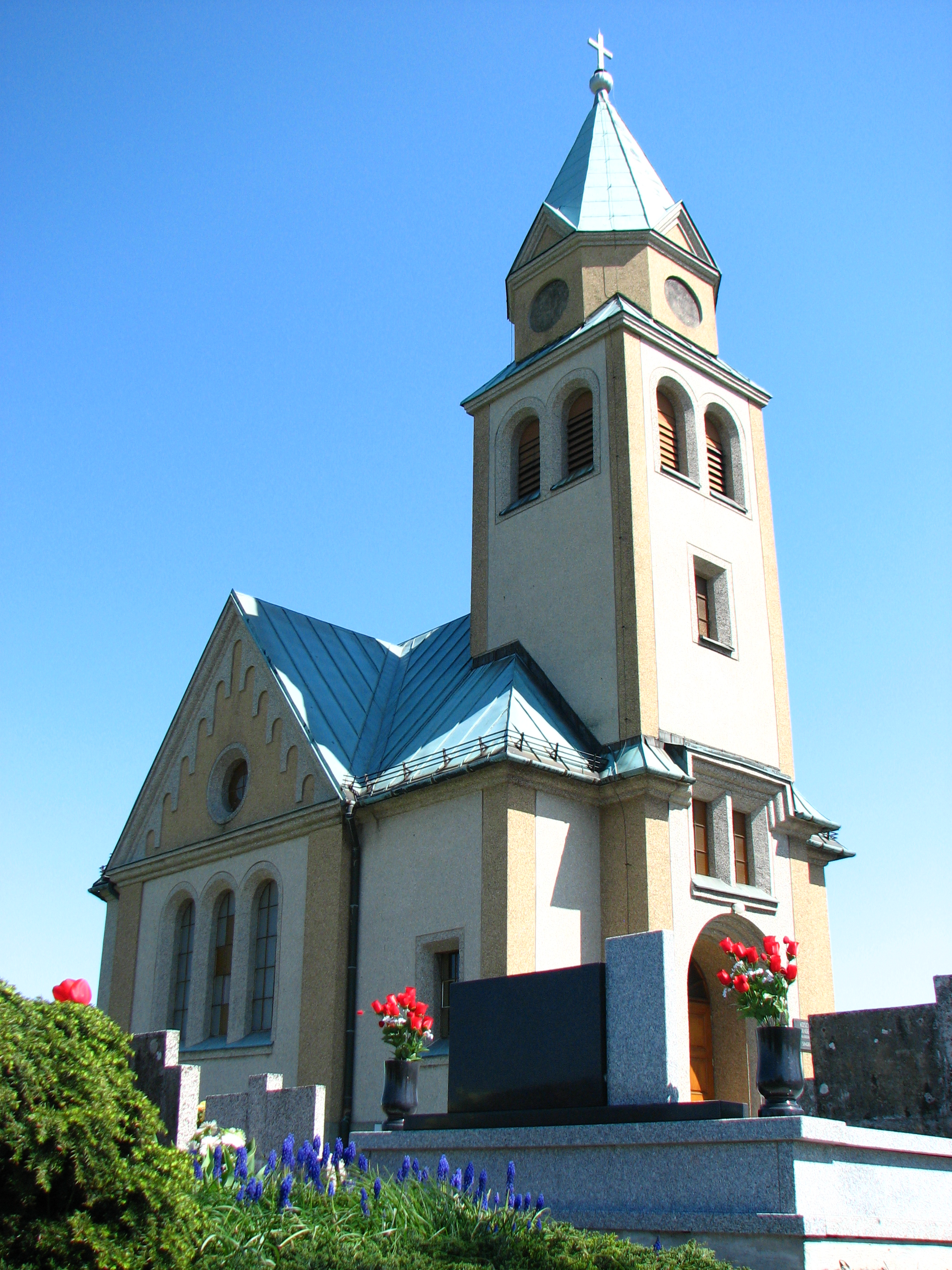
Lutheran church of the Holy Spirit

== Geography ==
Simoradz lies in the southern part of Poland, west of Skoczów, 12 km (7 mi) north-east of the county seat, Cieszyn, 22 km (14 mi) west of Bielsko-Biała, 55 km (34 mi) south-west of the regional capital Katowice, and 12 km (7.5 mi) east of the border with the Czech Republic.

The village is situated on one of the hills of the Silesian Foothills, which height is 350 m (1,150 ft) above sea level, 15 km (9.3 mi) north of the Silesian Beskids; It's ensconced in the north and south by two streams, right tributaries of the Knajka stream, in the watershed of the Vistula. The biggest forest, called Dąbczak, lies in the north-west part of the village.
