= Iskrzyczyn =

- Village
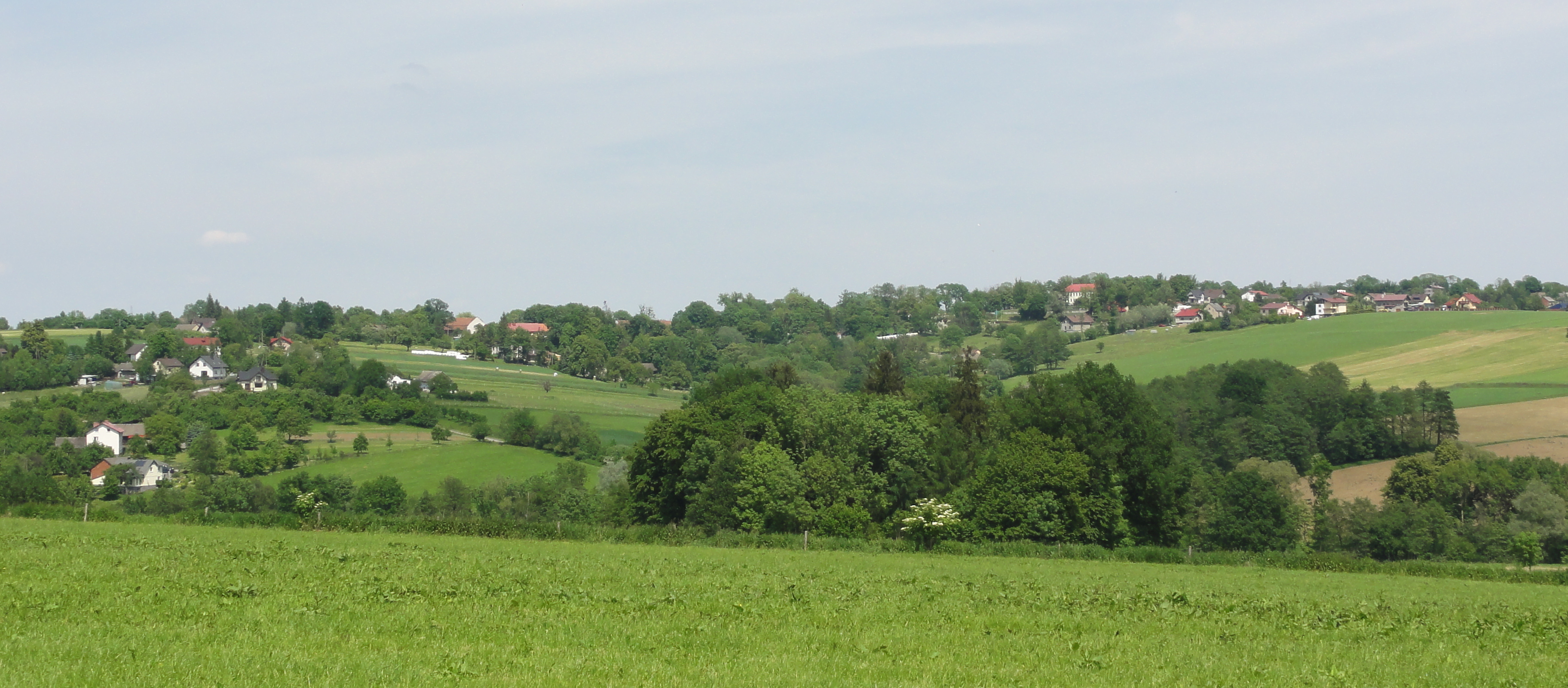
- General view

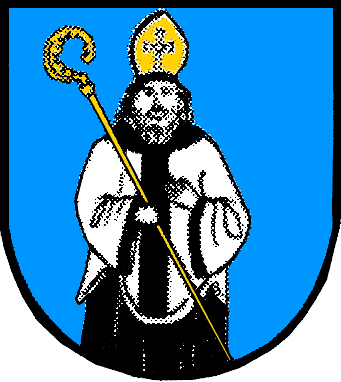
- Coat of arms

- Location within Poland
- Coordinates: 49°47′48.99″N 18°44′28.48″E
- Country: Poland
- Voivodeship: Silesian
- County: Cieszyn
- Gmina: Dębowiec
- First mentioned: 1223

Government
  - Sołtys: Piotr Gąsior

Area
  - Total: 4.65 km^{2} (1.80 sq mi)

Population (2005)
  - Total: 632
  - Density: 136/km^{2} (352/sq mi)
- Time zone: UTC+1 (CET)
  - Summer (DST): UTC+2 (CEST)
- Postal code: 43-426
- Car plates: SCI
- Website: http://www.iskrzyczyn.pl/

Iskrzyczyn [isˈkʂɨt͡ʂɨn] is a village in Gmina Dębowiec, Cieszyn County, Silesian Voivodeship, southern Poland. It has an area of 4.65 square kilometres (1.80 sq mi) and a population of 632 (2005).

== Etymology ==
The name, primordially Iskrzyczyno, is Slavic and possessive in origins derived from personal name Iskrzyca. It used to be Germanised as Iskritschin or Iskrzitschin.

== History ==
The village lies in the historical region of Cieszyn Silesia. It was first mentioned in a document of Bishop of Wrocław issued on 23 May 1223 for Norbertine Sisters in Rybnik among villages paying them a tithe, as Y(I)sc(h)richino.

Politically it belonged then to the Duchy of Opole and Racibórz and the Castellany of Cieszyn, which was in 1290 formed in the process of feudal fragmentation of Poland into the Duchy of Teschen, ruled by a local branch of Silesian Piast dynasty. In 1327 the duchy became a fee of the Kingdom of Bohemia, which after 1526 became a part of the Habsburg monarchy. In 1453 it was bought by the Tschammer noble family.

The first school in Iskrzyczyn was opened in 1898.

After the Revolutions of 1848 in the Austrian Empire a modern municipal division was introduced in the re-established Austrian Silesia. The village as a municipality was subscribed to the political district of Bielsko and the legal district of Skoczów. According to the censuses conducted in 1880, 1890, 1900 and 1910 the population of the municipality dropped from 481 in 1880 to 430 in 1910, with the majority of inhabitants being native Polish-speakers (97.3%-100%) and in 1890 also a small German-speaking minority (10 or 2.5%), in terms of religion the majority were Roman Catholics (64.7% in 1910), followed by Protestants (35.3% in 1910). The village was also traditionally inhabited by Cieszyn Vlachs, speaking Cieszyn Silesian dialect.

After World War I, the fall of Austria-Hungary, the Polish–Czechoslovak War and the division of Cieszyn Silesia in 1920, it became a part of Poland. It was then annexed by Nazi Germany at the beginning of World War II. After the war it was restored to Poland.

== Geography ==
Iskrzyczyn lies in the southern part of Poland, 4 km (2 mi) west of the nearest town, Skoczów, 10 km (6 mi) north-east of the county seat, Cieszyn, 22 km (14 mi) west of Bielsko-Biała, 55 km (34 mi) south-west of the regional capital Katowice, and 11 km (6.8 mi) east of the border with the Czech Republic.

The village is situated in the Silesian Foothills, on the Górka Tarnawa hill, which height is 373 m (1,224 ft) above sea level, 12 km (7.5 mi) north of the Silesian Beskids. It's ensconced in the north and south by two streams, right tributaries of the Knajka stream in the watershed of the Vistula;
