= Gumna =

- Village
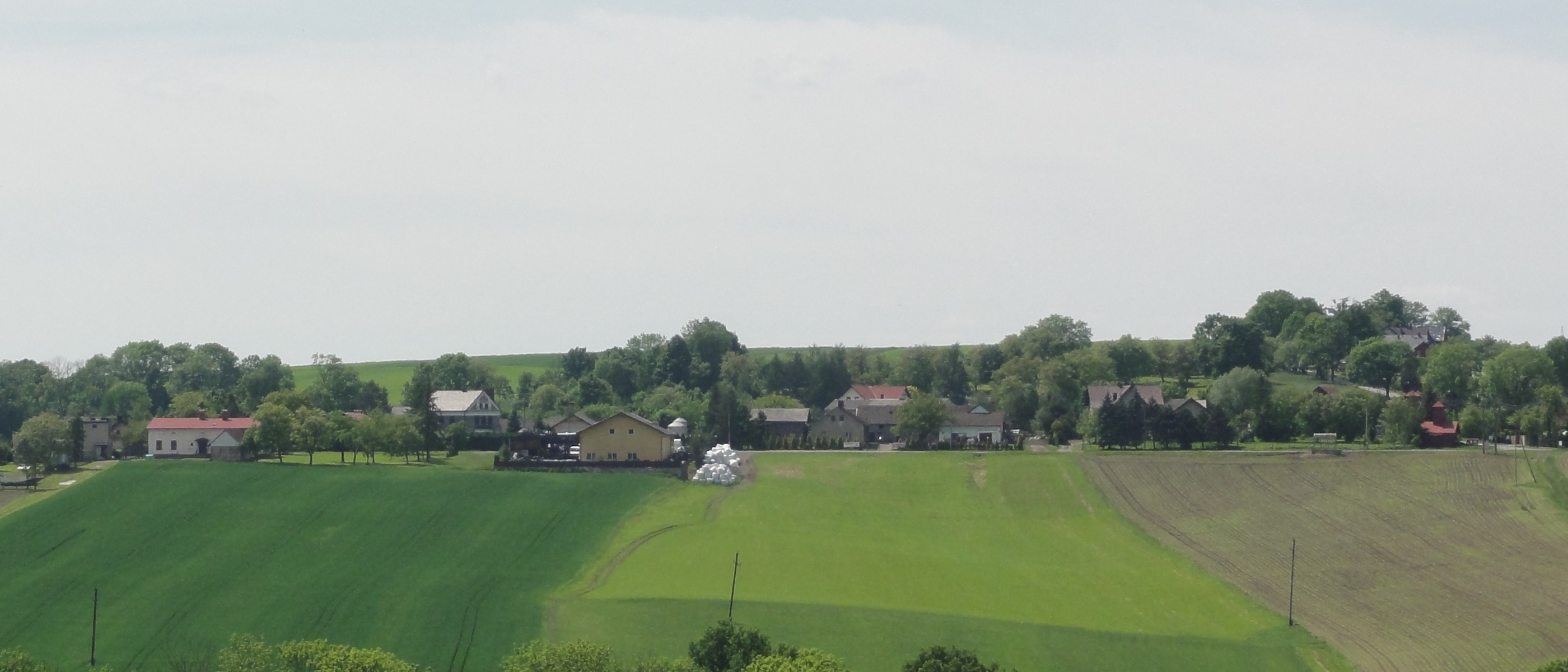
- General view

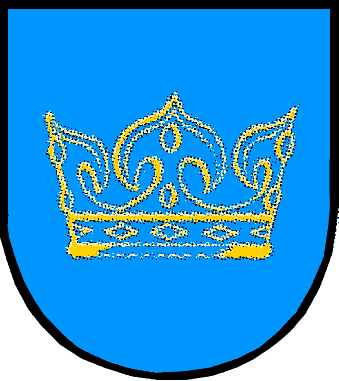
- Coat of arms

- Location within Poland
- Coordinates: 49°46′24.31″N 18°41′26.02″E
- Country: Poland
- Voivodeship: Silesian
- County: Cieszyn
- Gmina: Dębowiec
- First mentioned: 1523
- Area: 4.1 km^{2} (1.6 sq mi)
- Population (2004): 414
  - Density: 100/km^{2} (260/sq mi)
- Time zone: UTC+1 (CET)
  - Summer (DST): UTC+2 (CEST)
- Postal code: 43-426
- Car plates: SCI

Gumna [ˈɡumna] is a village in Gmina Dębowiec, Cieszyn County, Silesian Voivodeship, southern Poland.

The name is of cultural origin and is a plural form of gumno, in Polish denoting a threshing floor.

== History ==
The village lies in the historical region of Cieszyn Silesia. Archaeological traces of the first farmers in the area from Lengyel culture (4th millennia BC) have been found in the village.

The village was first mentioned in 1523 as Humna. Politically the village belonged then to the Duchy of Teschen, a fee of the Kingdom of Bohemia, which after 1526 became part of the Habsburg monarchy.

After the Revolutions of 1848 in the Austrian Empire a modern municipal division was introduced in the re-established Austrian Silesia. The village as a municipality was subscribed to the political and legal district of Cieszyn. According to the censuses conducted in 1880, 1890, 1900 and 1910 the population of the municipality dropped from 330 in 1880 to 312 in 1910 with the majority being native Polish-speakers (dropping from 100% in 1880 to 92.9% in 1910) accompanied by a German-speaking people (at most 22 or 7.1% in 1910). In terms of religion in 1910 majority were Protestants (56.1%), followed by Roman Catholics (41.3%) and Jews (8 or 2.6%). The village was also traditionally inhabited by Cieszyn Vlachs, speaking Cieszyn Silesian dialect.

The Lutheran cemetery was established in Gumna in 1901.

After World War I, the fall of Austria-Hungary, the Polish–Czechoslovak War and the division of Cieszyn Silesia in 1920, it became a part of Poland. It was then annexed by Nazi Germany at the beginning of World War II. After the war it was restored to Poland.

== Geography ==
Gumna lies in the southern part of Poland, north-east of Cieszyn, 28 km (17 mi) west of Bielsko-Biała, 60 km (37 mi) south-west of the regional capital Katowice, and 6 km (3.7 mi) east of the border with the Czech Republic.

The village is situated in the Silesian Foothills, up to approximately 385 m (1,263 ft) above sea level, 10 km (6.2 mi) north of the Silesian Beskids; It straddles over the border between watersheds of Odra (through Olza to the west) and Vistula (through Knajka to the east);
