= Łączka, Silesian Voivodeship =

Łączka
- Village
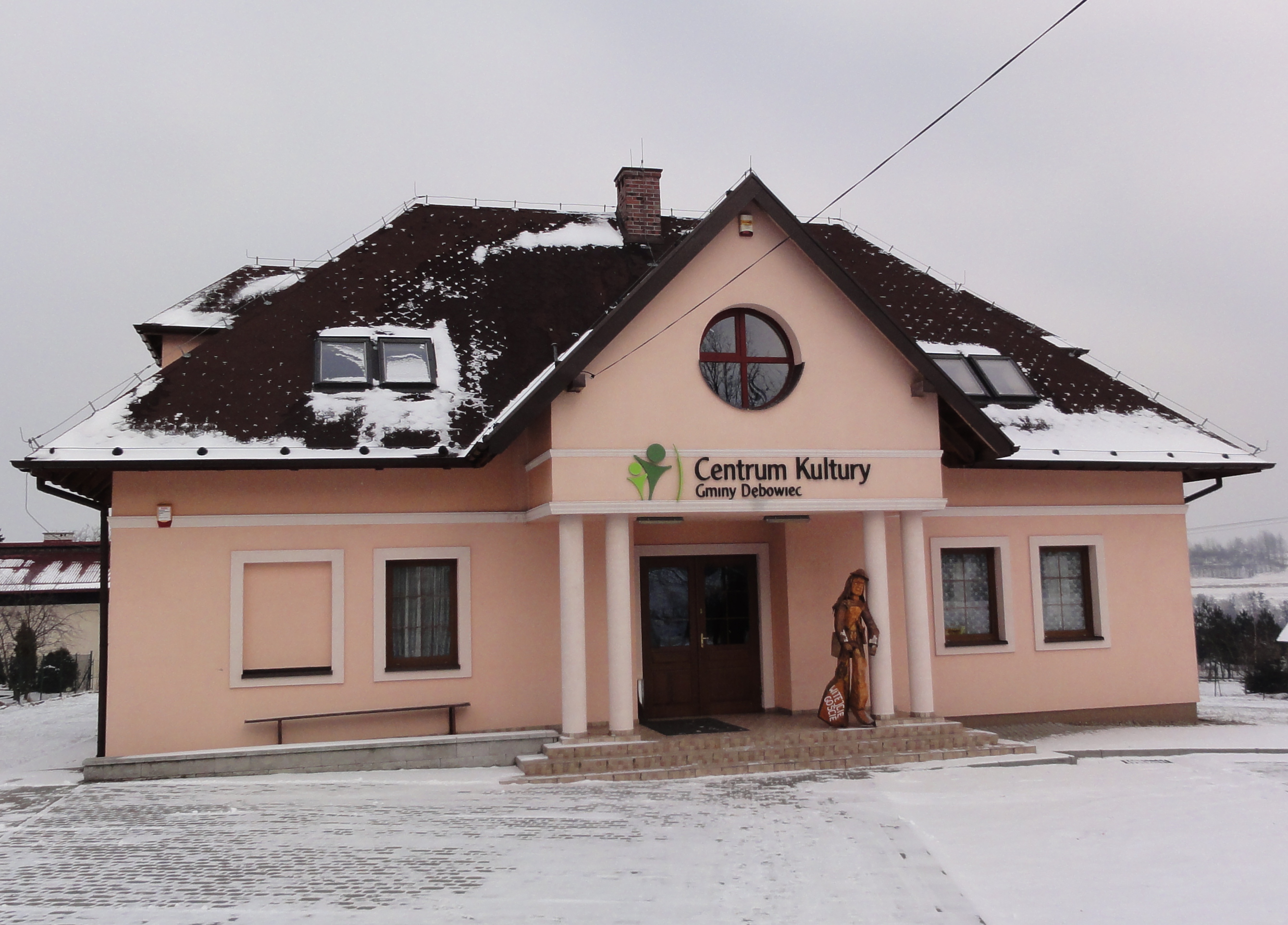
- Culture Centre

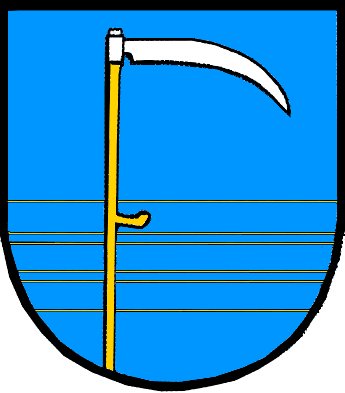
- Coat of arms

- Location within Poland
- Coordinates: 49°46′39.32″N 18°44′15.68″E
- Country: Poland
- Voivodeship: Silesian
- County: Cieszyn
- Gmina: Dębowiec
- First mentioned: 1434 (?)

Area
  - Total: 1.92 km^{2} (0.74 sq mi)

Population (2004)
  - Total: 288
  - Density: 150/km^{2} (388/sq mi)
- Time zone: UTC+1 (CET)
  - Summer (DST): UTC+2 (CEST)
- Postal code: 43-426
- Car plates: SCI

Łączka [ˈwɔnt͡ʂka] is a village in Gmina Dębowiec, Cieszyn County, Silesian Voivodeship, southern Poland.

The name is of Slavic and topographic origins and literally means a small meadow.

== History ==
It lies in the historical region of Cieszyn Silesia. It could have been first mentioned in the letter issued by Wenceslaus I, Duke of Cieszyn on 12 March 1434 in which he bestowed a place called Lochni/Locheny (Łączka?) adjacent to Kiesselaw (Kisielów) upon Ticzko von Logau (who would be therefore its noble owner). It was later mentioned in 1466 (od Luczkey hranicy), 1573 (w Lucze) and so on. Politically it belonged then to the Duchy of Teschen, a fee of the Kingdom of Bohemia, which after 1526 became a part of the Habsburg monarchy.

After the Revolutions of 1848 in the Austrian Empire a modern municipal division was introduced in the re-established Austrian Silesia. The village as a municipality was subscribed to the political district of Bielsko and the legal district of Skoczów. According to the censuses conducted in 1880, 1890, 1900 and 1910 the population of the municipality grew from 135 in 1880 to 143 in 1910, all of them were native Polish-speakers mostly Roman Catholics (56% in 1910), followed by Protestants (44% in 1910). The village was also traditionally inhabited by Cieszyn Vlachs, speaking Cieszyn Silesian dialect.

After World War I, the fall of Austria-Hungary, the Polish–Czechoslovak War and the division of Cieszyn Silesia in 1920, it became a part of Poland. It was then annexed by Nazi Germany at the beginning of World War II. After the war it was restored to Poland.

== Geography ==
Łączka lies in the southern part of Poland, 5 km (3 mi) south-west of the nearest town, Skoczów, 8 km (5 mi) north-east of the county seat, Cieszyn, 23 km (14 mi) west of Bielsko-Biała, 60 km (37 mi) south-west of the regional capital Katowice, and 10 km (6.2 mi) east of the border with the Czech Republic.

The village is situated in the Silesian Foothills, up to approximately 340 m (1,120 ft) above sea level, 10 km (6.2 mi) north of the Silesian Beskids, in area drained by several streams, right tributaries of the Knajka stream, in the watershed of the Vistula.
