= Ogrodzona, Silesian Voivodeship =

Ogrodzona
- Village
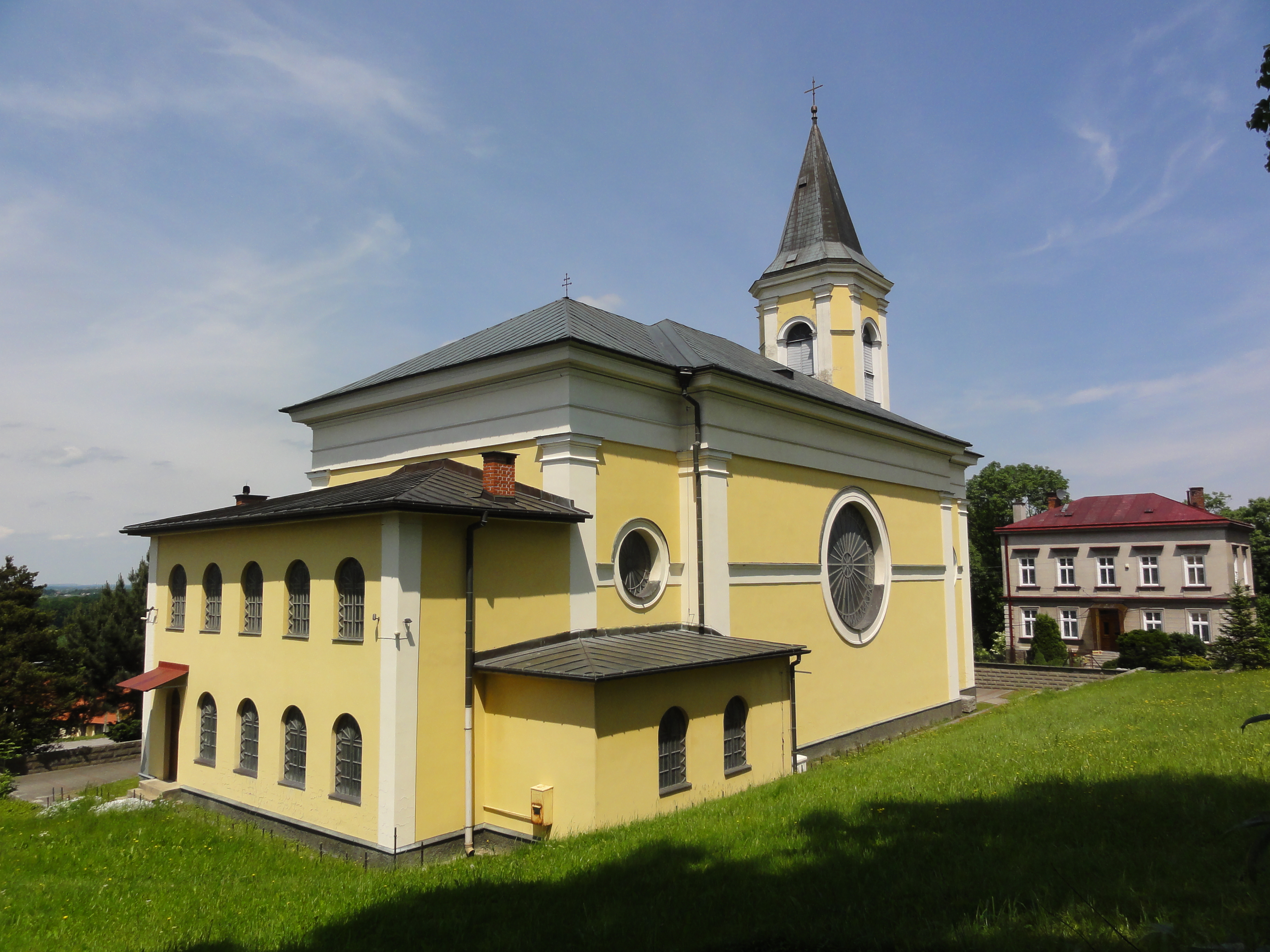
- Church of Saint Matthew

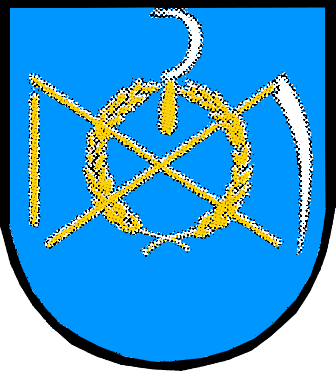
- Coat of arms

- Location within Poland
- Coordinates: 49°46′13.78″N 18°43′32.82″E
- Country: Poland
- Voivodeship: Silesian
- County: Cieszyn
- Gmina: Dębowiec
- First mentioned: 1223

Government
  - Mayor: Ryszard Woźniak

Area
  - Total: 6.95 km^{2} (2.68 sq mi)

Population (2004)
  - Total: 838
  - Density: 121/km^{2} (312/sq mi)
- Time zone: UTC+1 (CET)
  - Summer (DST): UTC+2 (CEST)
- Postal code: 43-426
- Car plates: SCI

Ogrodzona [ɔɡrɔˈd͡zɔna] is a village in Gmina Dębowiec, Cieszyn County, Silesian Voivodeship, southern Poland.

The name is of cultural origins and literally means [a] fenced/penned [place, village] (feminine adjective from Polish ogrodzenie).

== History ==
The village lies the historical region of Cieszyn Silesia. It was first mentioned in a document of Bishop of Wrocław issued on 23 May 1223 for Norbertine Sisters in Rybnik among villages paying them a tithe, as Ogrozona.

Politically it belonged then to the Duchy of Opole and Racibórz and the Castellany of Cieszyn, which was in 1290 formed in the process of feudal fragmentation of Poland into the Duchy of Teschen, ruled by a local branch of Silesian Piast dynasty. In 1327 the duchy became a fee of the Kingdom of Bohemia, which after 1526 became a part of the Habsburg monarchy.

The village became a seat of a Catholic parish, and was mentioned in the register of Peter's Pence payment from 1447 among the 50 parishes of Teschen deanery as Ogrodzona.

After the Revolutions of 1848 in the Austrian Empire a modern municipal division was introduced in the re-established Austrian Silesia. The village as a municipality was subscribed to the political and legal district of Cieszyn. According to the censuses conducted in 1880, 1890, 1900 and 1910 the population of the municipality dropped from 468 in 1880 to 460 in 1910 with the majority being native Polish-speakers (between 97.2% and 98.6%) accompanied by a small German-speaking minority (at most 11 or 2.4% in 1880) and Czech-speaking people (at most 5 or 1.1% in 1910). In terms of religion in 1910 the majority were Roman Catholics (57.9%), followed by Protestants (39.2%) and Jews (14 or 2.9%). The village was also traditionally inhabited by Cieszyn Vlachs, speaking Cieszyn Silesian dialect.

After World War I, the fall of Austria-Hungary, the Polish–Czechoslovak War and the division of Cieszyn Silesia in 1920, it became a part of Poland. It was then annexed by Nazi Germany at the beginning of World War II. After the war it was restored to Poland.

== Geography ==
Ogrodzona lies in the southern part of Poland, east of Cieszyn, 25 km (16 mi) west of Bielsko-Biała, 60 km (37 mi) south-west of the regional capital Katowice, and 7 km (4.3 mi) east of the border with the Czech Republic.

The village is situated in the Silesian Foothills, with the highest hill reaching 359 m (1,178 ft) above sea level, 9 km (5.6 mi) north of the Silesian Beskids. The northern part of the village forms the headwaters area of the Knajka stream, in the watershed of the Vistula, whereas the southern part of the village belongs to Olza River drainage area, in the watershed of Odra. The biggest forest, called Kamieniec, lies in the north west part of the village and is a Natura 2000 site, Cieszyńskie Źródła Tufowe (PLH240001).

Expressway S52 runs through the village.

== Gallery ==
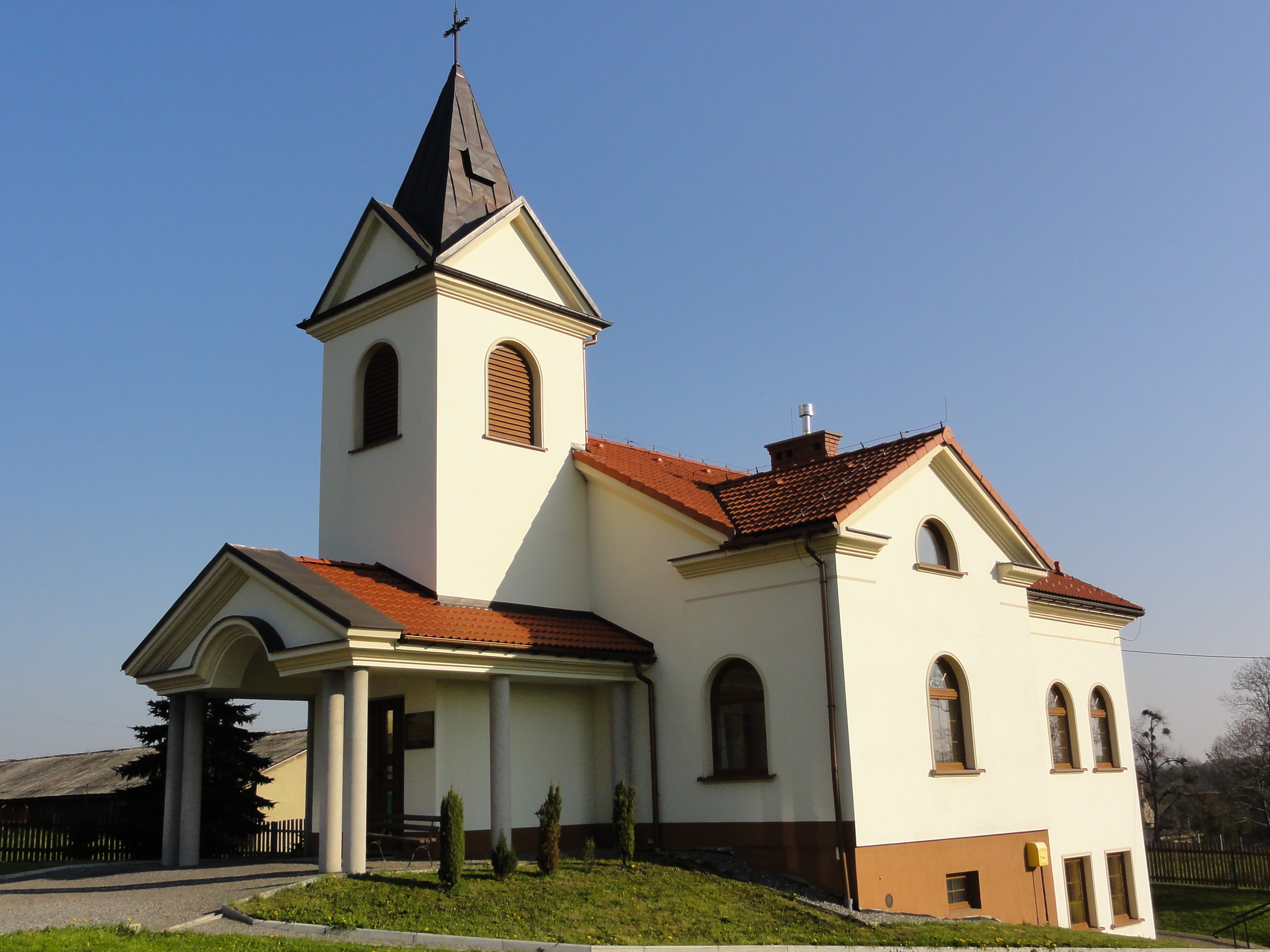
Lutheran church

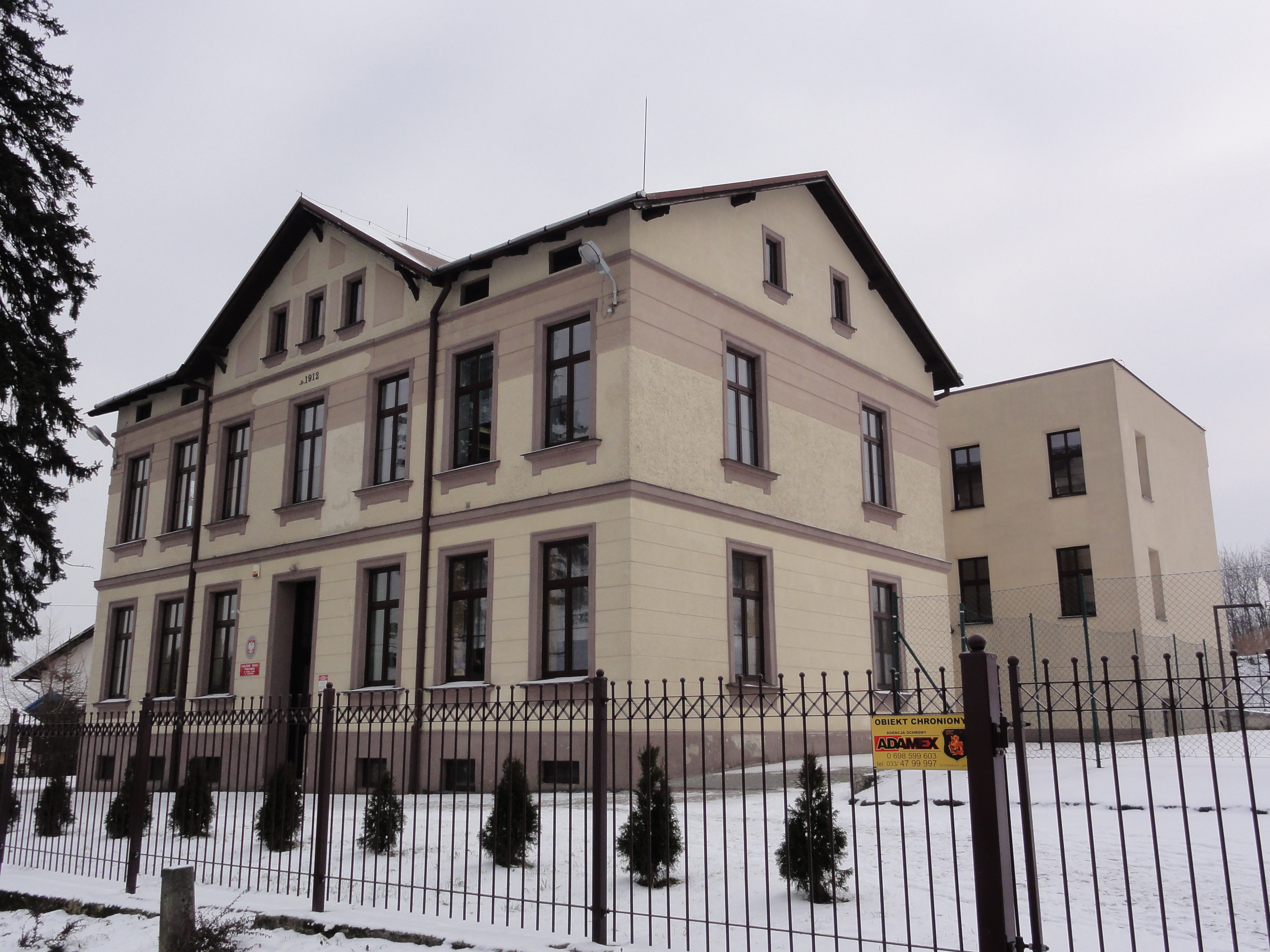
Elementary school

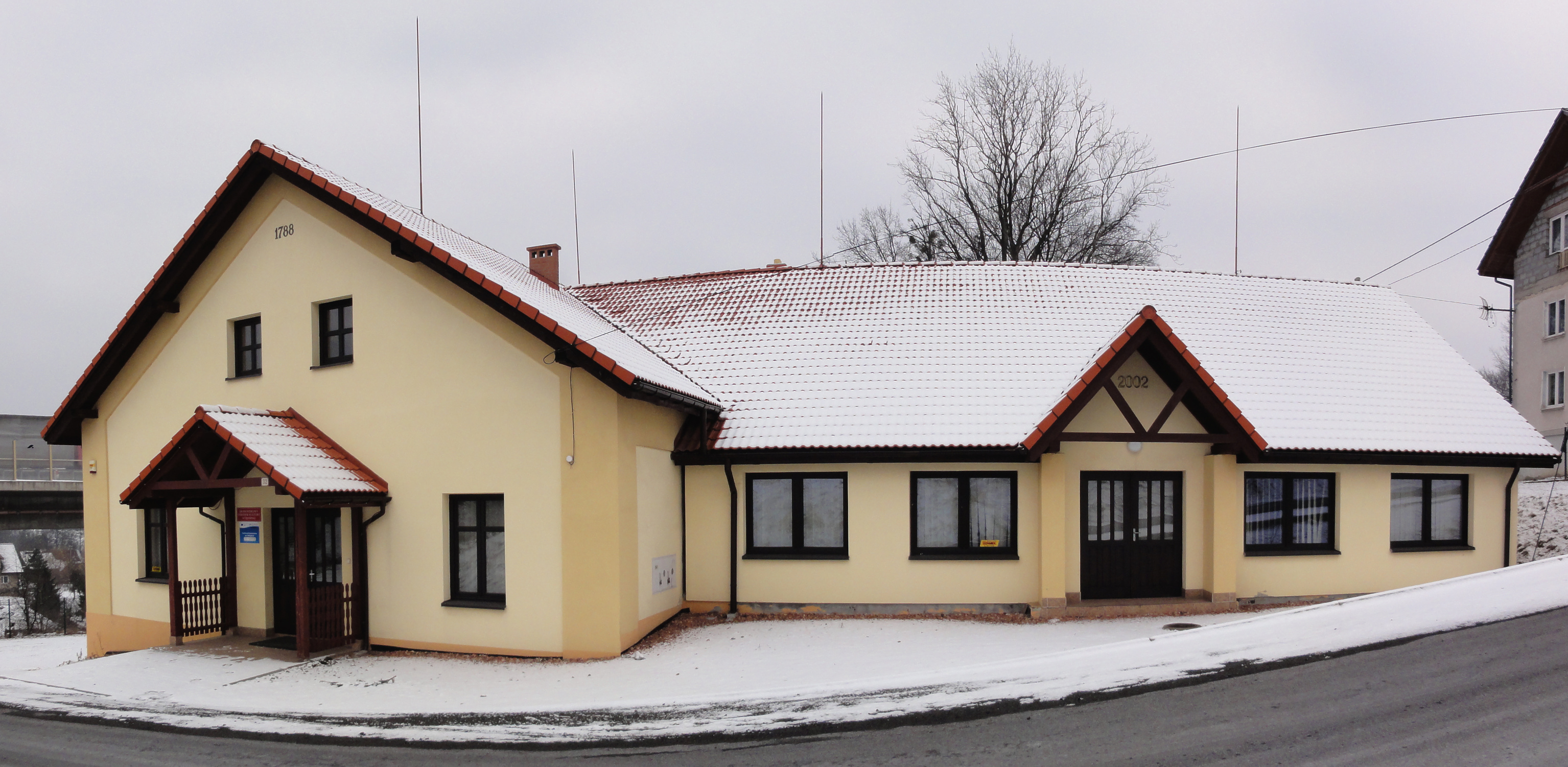
Culture Centre of Society

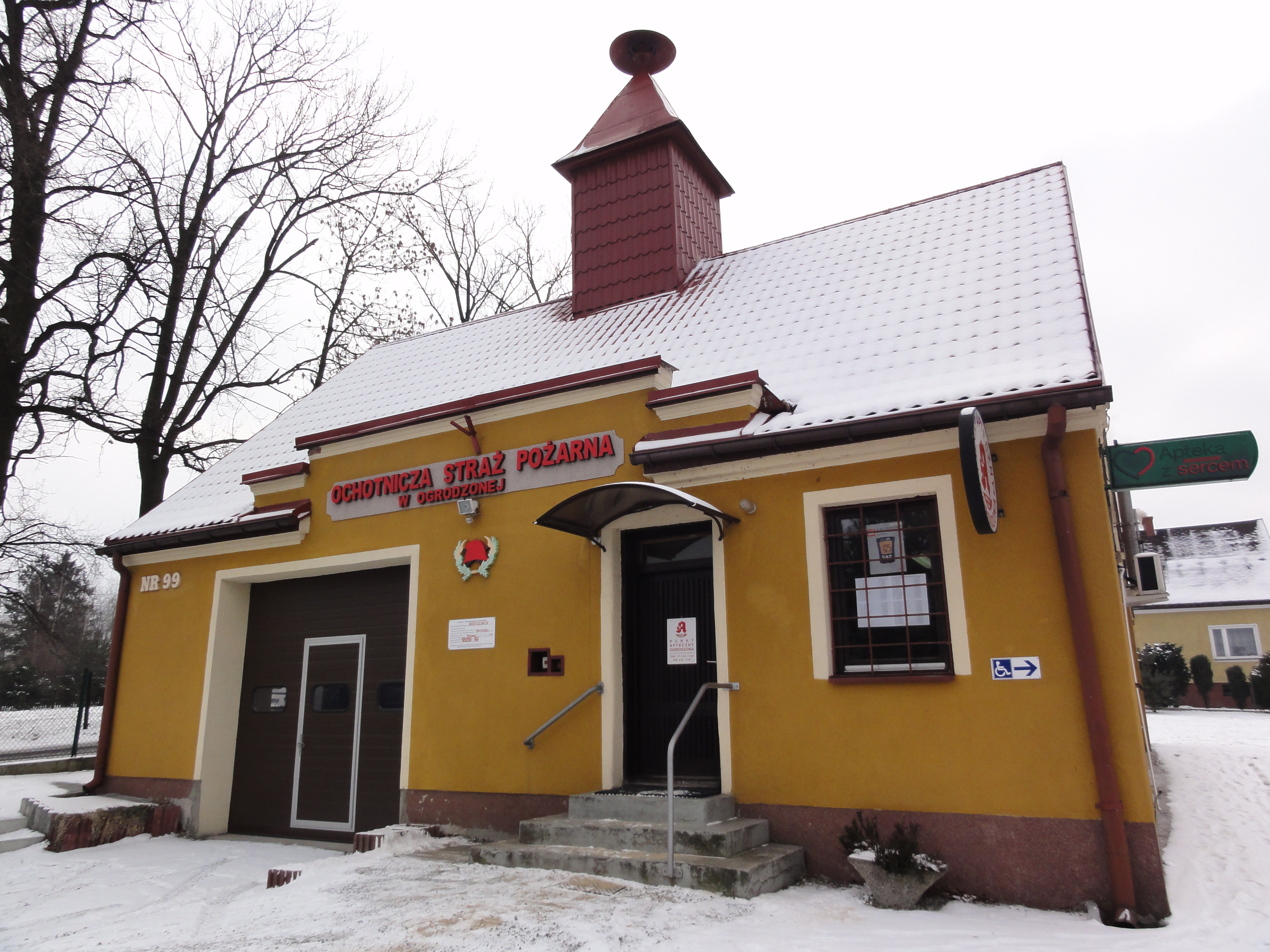
Fire department
