= Kostkowice, Cieszyn County =

Kostkowice
- Village
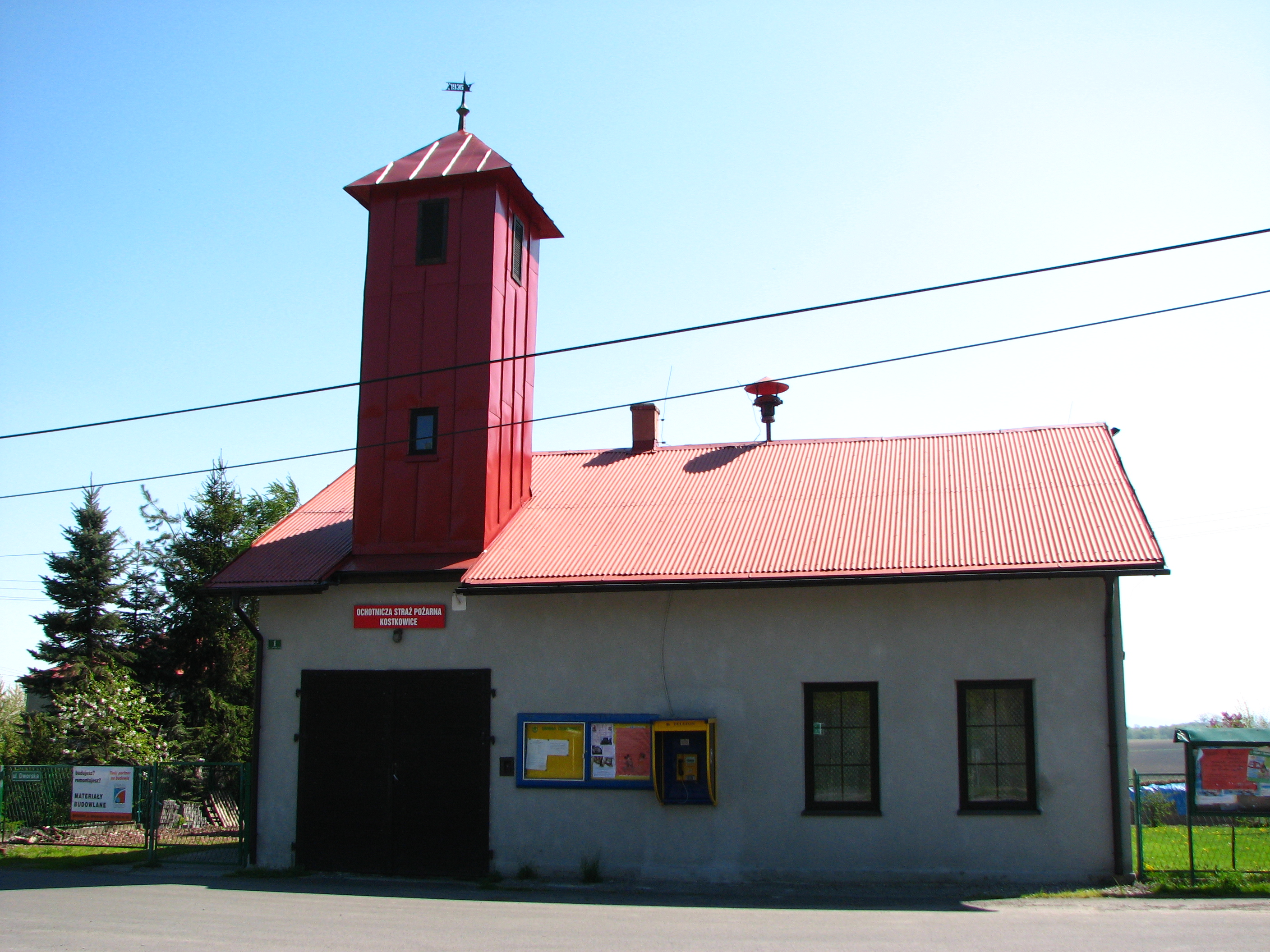
- Fire station

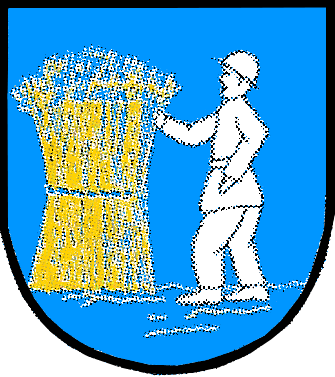
- Coat of arms

- Location within Poland
- Coordinates: 49°47′37.90″N 18°42′5.14″E
- Country: Poland
- Voivodeship: Silesian
- County: Cieszyn
- Gmina: Dębowiec
- First mentioned: ca. 1305

Area
  - Total: 5.1 km^{2} (2.0 sq mi)

Population (2004)
  - Total: 530
  - Density: 100/km^{2} (270/sq mi)
- Time zone: UTC+1 (CET)
  - Summer (DST): UTC+2 (CEST)
- Postal code: 43-425
- Car plates: SCI

Kostkowice ([kɔstkɔˈvit͡sɛ]) is a village in Gmina Dębowiec, Cieszyn County, Silesian Voivodeship, southern Poland.

== Etymology ==
The name of the village is patronymic in origin, derived from the personal name Kostka, ending with a typically Slavic -(ow)ice. It was generally Germanized as Kostkowitz.

== History ==
The village lies in the historical region of Cieszyn Silesia. It was first mentioned in a Latin document of Diocese of Wrocław called Liber fundationis episcopatus Vratislaviensis from around 1305 as item in Goschegowitz debent esse XX mansi. It meant that the village was supposed to pay a tithe from 20 greater lans. The creation of the village was a part of a larger settlement campaign taking place in the late 13th century on the territory of what would later be known as Upper Silesia.

Politically the village belonged initially to the Duchy of Teschen, formed in 1290 in the process of feudal fragmentation of Poland and was ruled by a local branch of Silesian Piast dynasty. In 1327 the duchy became a fee of the Kingdom of Bohemia, which after 1526 became a part of the Habsburg monarchy.

After the Revolutions of 1848 in the Austrian Empire a modern municipal division was introduced in the re-established Austrian Silesia. The village as a municipality was subscribed to the political district of Bielsko and the legal district of Skoczów. According to the censuses conducted in 1880, 1890, 1900 and 1910 the population of the municipality grew from 355 in 1880 to 428 in 1910, with the majority of the inhabitants being native Polish-speakers (97.9%-99%) and a few people were German-speaking (most 8 or 1.9% in 1910) and Czech-speaking (most 4 or 1.1% in 1880), in terms of religion the majority were Roman Catholics (62.2% in 1910), followed by Protestants (37.8% in 1910). The village was also traditionally inhabited by Cieszyn Vlachs, speaking Cieszyn Silesian dialect.

After World War I, the fall of Austria-Hungary, the Polish–Czechoslovak War and the division of Cieszyn Silesia in 1920, it became a part of Poland. It was then annexed by Nazi Germany at the beginning of World War II. After the war it was restored to Poland.

== Geography ==
Kostkowice lies in the southern part of Poland, 7 km (4 mi) north-east of the county seat, Cieszyn, 25 km (16 mi) west of Bielsko-Biała, 60 km (37 mi) south-west of the regional capital Katowice, and 8 km (5.0 mi) east of the border with the Czech Republic.

The village is situated in the Silesian Foothills, up to approximately 330 m (1,080 ft) above sea level, 10 km (6.2 mi) north of the Silesian Beskids. It straddles over the border between watersheds of Odra (through Olza to the west) and Vistula (through Knajka to the east); The biggest forest in the village, called Kostkowiak, lies in the north-west part of the village, separating a former village Samlowiec in the north from the proper Kostkowice in the south, in the Knajka valley.
