= Gmina Dębowiec =

Gmina Dębowiec may refer to either of the following rural administrative districts in Poland:

- Gmina Dębowiec, Silesian Voivodeship
- Gmina Dębowiec, Subcarpathian Voivodeship
