= Dębowiec, Cieszyn County =

Dębowiec
- Village
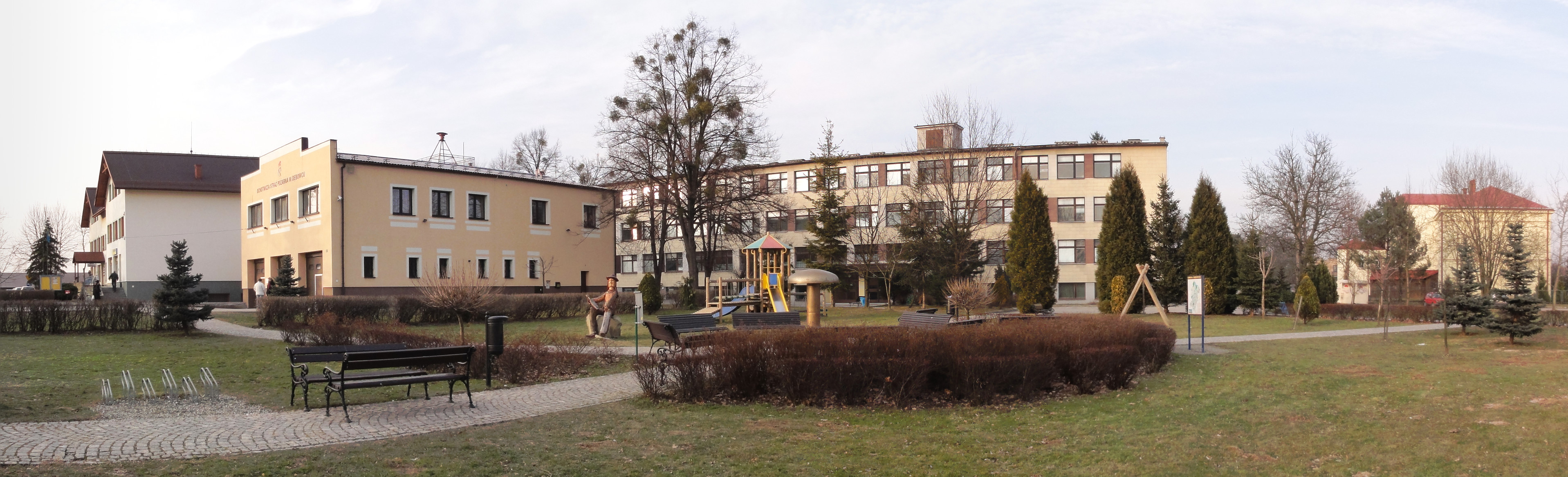
- Central part of the village

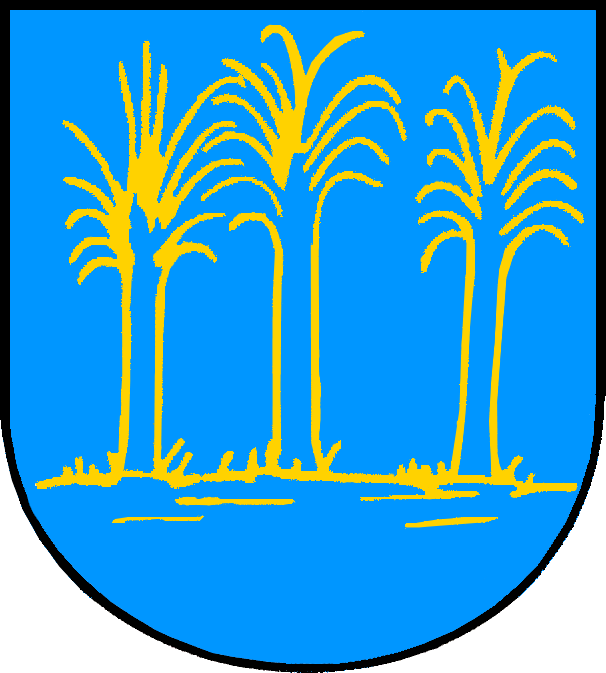
- Coat of arms

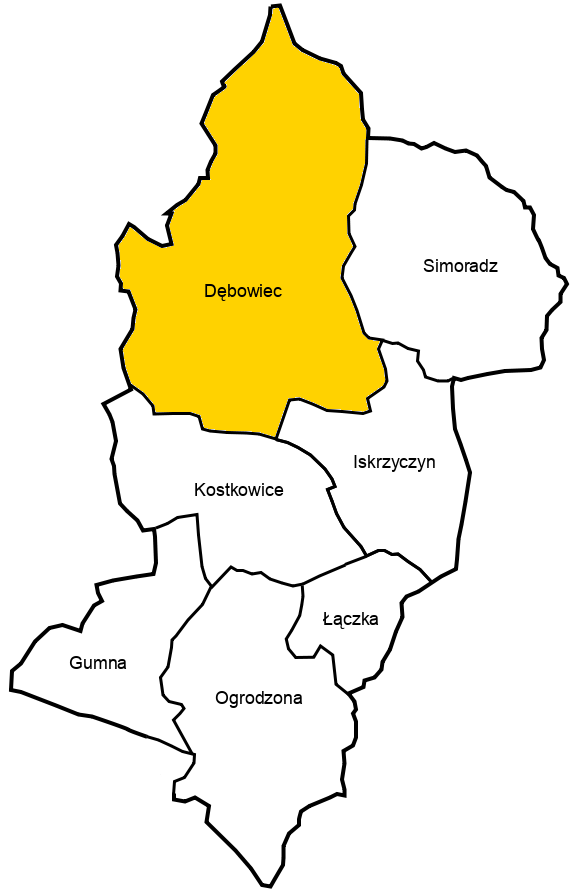
- Location of Dębowiec within Gmina Dębowiec

- Location within Silesian Voivodeship Location within Poland
- Coordinates: 49°48′48.72″N 18°43′12.40″E
- Country: Poland
- Voivodeship: Silesian
- County: Cieszyn
- Gmina: Dębowiec
- First mentioned: ca. 1305

Area
  - Total: 13.17 km^{2} (5.08 sq mi)

Population (2007)
  - Total: 1,772
  - Density: 134.5/km^{2} (348.5/sq mi)
- Time zone: UTC+1 (CET)
  - Summer (DST): UTC+2 (CEST)
- Postal code: 43-426
- Car plates: SCI

Dębowiec [ˈdɛ̃bɔviɛts] is a village and the seat of Gmina Dębowiec, Cieszyn County in Silesian Voivodeship, southern Poland. It has an area of 13.17 km^{2} (5.08 sq mi) and a population of 1,772 (2007). It lies in the historical region of Cieszyn Silesia.

== Etymology ==
Both Polish and German names are of topographic origins, but with a slightly different meanings. The Polish name is derived from oaks (Polish: dąb, plural dęby) and denotes an oaken part of wood. German name: Baumgarten is a conjunction of two words: Baum (tree) and Garten (garden).

== History ==
The village was first mentioned in a Latin document of Diocese of Wrocław called Liber fundationis episcopatus Vratislaviensis from around 1305 as item in Dambonczal. It meant that the village was in the process of location (the size of land to pay a tithe from was not yet precise). The creation of the village was a part of a larger settlement campaign taking place in the late 13th century on the territory of what would later be known as Upper Silesia.

The village became a seat of a Catholic parish, first mentioned in an incomplete register of Peter's Pence payment from 1335 as Bemgard and as such being one of the oldest in the region. It was again mentioned in the register of Peter's Pence payment from 1447 among the 50 parishes of Teschen deanery as Bomgarte.

The name from 1335 is of Germanic roots and indicates that among long ethnically Polish (Slavic, as the name from Liber fundationis.. is of Slavic origins) citizens an unknown number of German settlers arrived and gave the common village a German name which eventually evolved into Baumgarten.

Politically the village belonged initially to the Duchy of Teschen, formed in 1290 in the process of feudal fragmentation of Poland and was ruled by a local branch of Piast dynasty. In 1327 the duchy became a fee of the Kingdom of Bohemia, which after 1526 became part of the Habsburg monarchy.

After the 1540s Protestant Reformation prevailed in the Duchy of Teschen and a local Catholic church was taken over by Lutherans. It was taken from them, as one from around fifty buildings in the region, by a special commission and given back to the Roman Catholic Church on 18 April 1654.

On 15 March 1793 the village was bought from Marklowski noble family by Prince Albert of Saxony, Duke of Teschen and included in Teschener Kammer. In 1807 the first school in Dębowiec was opened, before that the local children attended to school in Simoradz. In 1854-1856 new bricked church was built, which replaced old wooden church. Lutherans built a cemetery chapel in 1912. The new school building was opened in 1908, to celebrate 60 years of reign of Franz Joseph I of Austria.

After the Revolutions of 1848 in the Austrian Empire a modern municipal division was introduced in the re-established Austrian Silesia. The village as a municipality was subscribed to the political district of Bielsko and the legal district of Skoczów. According to the censuses conducted in 1880, 1890, 1900 and 1910 the population of the village dropped from 992 in 1880 to 984 in 1910, with majority of the inhabitants being native Polish-speakers (between 99% and 99.1%) and a few people German-speaking (at most 9 or 0.9% in 1880 and 1890) or Czech-speaking (at most 7 or 0.7% in 1900), in terms of religion in 1910 majority were Roman Catholics (560 or 56.9%), followed by Lutherans (417 or 42.4%) and Jews (7 people). The village was also traditionally inhabited by Cieszyn Vlachs, speaking Cieszyn Silesian dialect.

At the beginnings of the 20th century methane was discovered in the village. Its explosion in 1911 caused a fire lasting few days.

After World War I, the fall of Austria-Hungary, the Polish–Czechoslovak War and the division of Cieszyn Silesia in 1920, it became a part of Poland. It was then annexed by Nazi Germany at the beginning of World War II. During the night between 15 and 16 February 1941 the first elite special-operations paratroops called Cichociemni parachuted over Dębowiec. It was caused by a mistake of navigator and a lack of fuel as they originally intended to land somewhere around Włoszczowa. After the war the village was restored to Poland.

In 2014 graduation tower in the center of the village was opened.

== Geography ==
Dębowiec lies in the southern part of Poland, approximately 6 kilometres (4 mi) west of the nearest town, Skoczów, 10 km (6 mi) north-east of the county seat, Cieszyn, 24 km (15 mi) west of Bielsko-Biała, 55 km (34 mi) south-west of the regional capital Katowice, and 10 km (6.2 mi) east of the border with the Czech Republic.

It is situated on the Knajka river (left tributary of the Vistula), along which many fish ponds are located. It lies on the geographical border between Silesian Foothills (to the south), Ostrava Basin (to north-west) and Oświęcim Basin (to north-east), between 270–340 m (890–1,120 ft) above sea level; 15 km (9.3 mi) north of the Silesian Beskids; The biggest forest, called Dębowczak, lies in the north-west part of the village. Several oak trees (Quercus robur) aged between 250 and 300 years were registered in 1959 as natural monuments.
