= Cieszyn folk costume =

Silesian folk costume

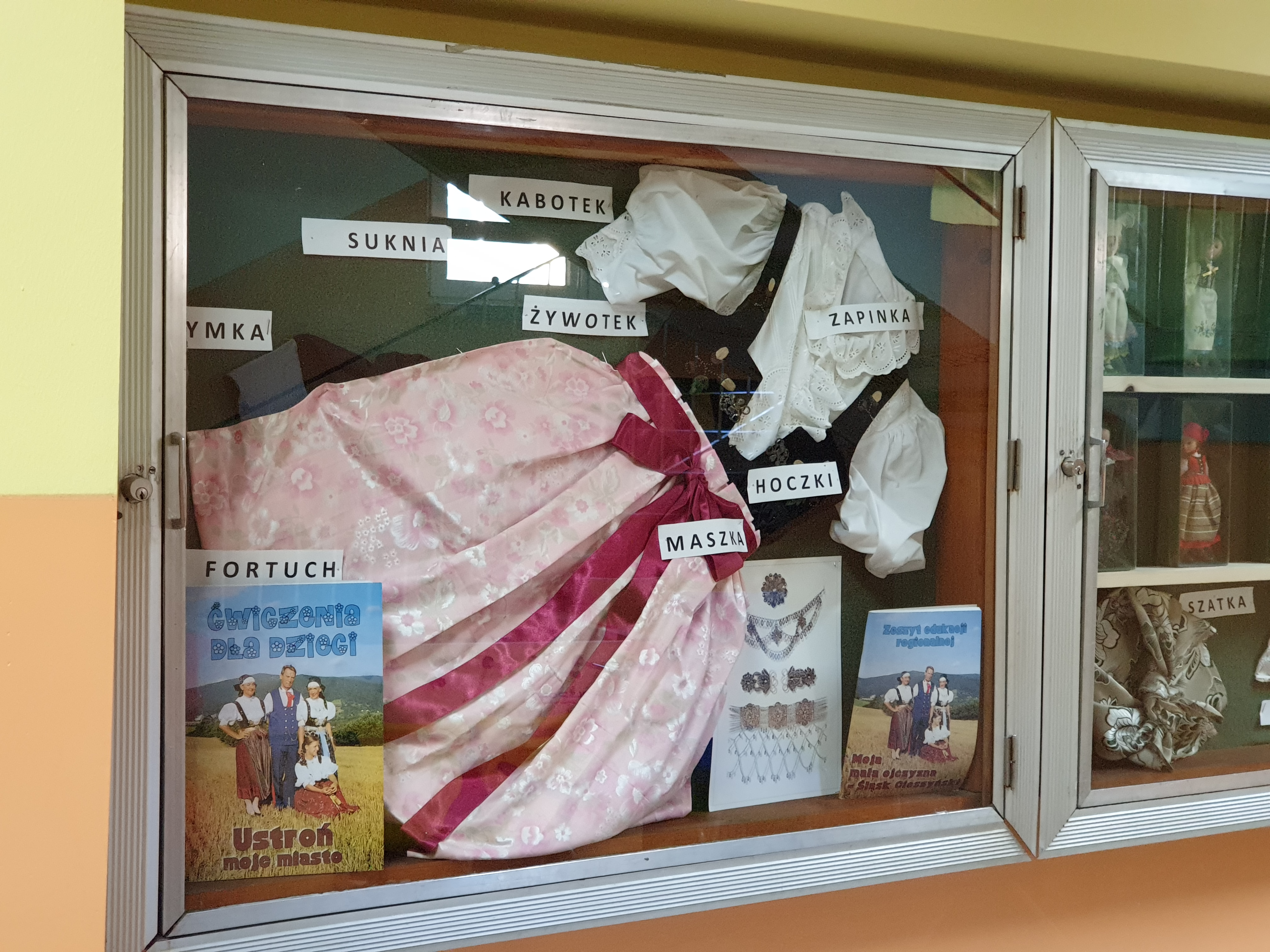
Female Cieszyn folk costume with featured elements (2nd Primary School in Ustroń

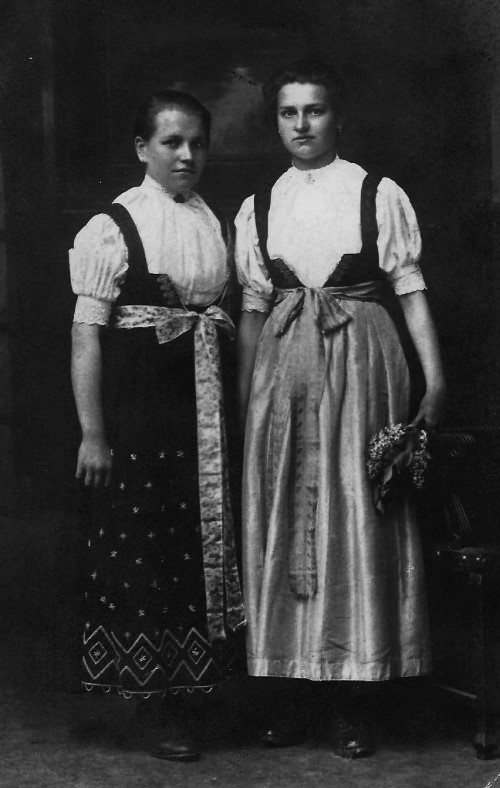
Women in Cieszynian folk costumes

Cieszyn folk costume, also known as Valachian, is a Silesian folk costume, which used to be worn within majority of the area of Cieszyn Silesia, but mostly by Cieszyn Vlachs. Taking into consideration ornamentation, cutting and materials, it can be observed that it is a replica of historical costumes of the Renaissance. The male folk costume was worn only to the late 19th century, whereas the female folk costume was more popular and spread in the vicinity of the Wisła, Istebna and Koniaków. Previously in this area the costumes of Silesian Gorals prevailed. Female folk costumes in Cieszyn were subjected to many changes, especially in respect to ornamentations and better quality of materials. Due to its richness and elegance the costume quickly became a target of artists and specialists in folk culture.

== Cieszyn folk costumes at the beginning of the 20th century ==
A significant change concerning sets of garments, cutting and materials can be observed in the second half of the 19th century. Moreover, the process of modernization intensified after the first World War. Since that time Cieszyn folk costumes have never come to their traditional form again. Men constituted the social group which was most prone to change and they first ceased to wear traditional costumes. It may be due to the fact that majority of men migrated to industrial cities for economic reasons. A clash of different cultures resulted in greater standardization. Tastes have changed and new materials were introduced to modify traditional cuttings. Kabotek is the conspicuous example of this process. The cutting of this short waist shift was simplified. What is more, handmade ornaments were replaced by machine embroidery and laces. Leather and silver elements in Cieszynian belt were frequently replaced by rubber and beads.

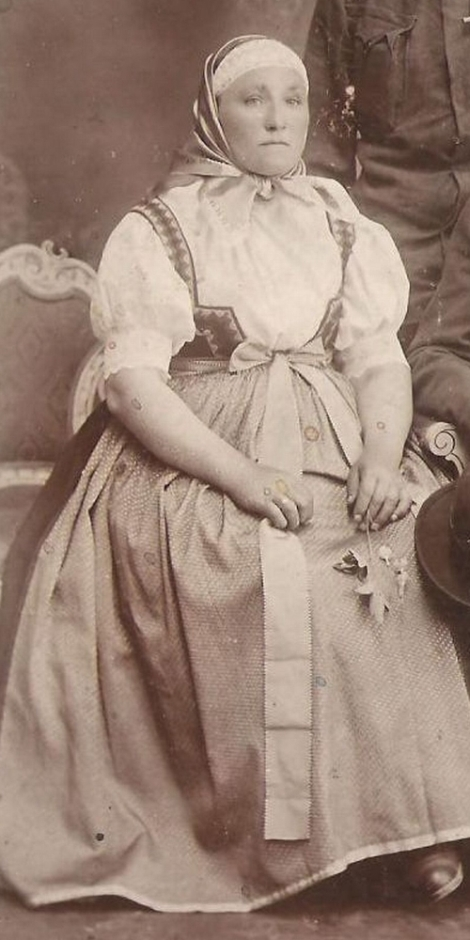
Woman in Cieszynian folk costume 1917

== Female folk costume ==
The female folk costume featured the lush and elegance, due to its essential element, silver jewellery. In the 18th and 19th century, women in Cieszyn wore splendorous clothes which consisted of a lace cap, covered with headgear, a short shirt (kabotek), redbreas, padded corset (żywotek), sewn at the waist, apron, white stockings and black shoes. It was not until a century later that the jewellery previously worn by the nobility and the bourgeoisie was adapted as the traditional costume by the population of small towns and villages.

=== Elements of the female folk costume ===
- Kabotek- a short waist shift with puffed, elbowlength sleeves. Wedding version of the shirt has long sleeves. Trimming of a thin collar, named lemiec, was embroidered a half cross stitch in black or brown. Later, satin stitch embroidery was introduced. Gradually, in the 20th century a half cross stitch was entirely supplanted by white satin stitch embroidery and broderie anglaise. Floral patterns became dominant.
- Żywotek- embroidered with silver or golden thread, stiffen kind of a corset with braces. The front part of żywotek, przedniczki, is widely cut in the shape of a rectangle. The back part of żywotek, oplecek, forms a characteristic triangle, called szczytek. The item of clothing is velvet and usually black or claret. Most frequently a golden thread is used for red velvet while silver thread is used for black velvet embroidery. However, it is not a strict rule. The cutting of żywotek has undergone many changes. The most remarkable one is an extension of the embroidered surface. Also decorative patterns were modified. Three bouquets, two flowers, and garlands became the most common ones. For embroidery metal threads were used, however, poorer women used silk threads. With time, silk floss gained popularity. Żywotek is decorated also with sequins, pearls and bead, so that they form a colourful mosaic. The item of clothing is stiffen with cardboard and lined lining.
- Dress- a dark colour wollen skirt, a sewed corset, and żywotek. Skirts were sewn with 6-8 meters of fabric panels and were 5-6 m wide.
- Zapaska- long, tied at the waist apron.
- Apron – more often linen than damask, consisted of two: front and back aprons, which replaced skirt.
- Slip
- Bonnet cap, named czepiec- consisting of a reticulated top and very decorative crocheted cap, named czółko. At first, czółko was to adhere as closely as possible to the head, later it became wider. Czółka were embroidered in small motifs, stars or dots. Czepiec is tied at the back and covered with usually linen cloth (chusta czepinowa). Currently, more common are silk cherry-gold or dark brown silk clothes, with a floral motif. Czepiec, was handmade, and his appearance differed depending on age and wealth of the owner.
- Loincloth- a patterned gibbon, tied in a bow at the waist. Its scarves often reached the end of the dress.

=== Jewellery ===
Similarly to Cieszynian folk costume, jewellery is a replica of ornaments from times of the Renaissance and the Reformation. Because of its being a trade rout and having fertile soil, Cieszyn was rather a rich city. Fashion was being modified in accordance to European markets thanks to trips of the last descendants of the Piast dynasty in Cieszyn on the turn of the 16th and 17th century. Cieszyn was the biggest centre of jewellery trade in the region. Ornaments were made of silver, gold, and some alloys. Metalwork techniques were filigree and casting. Male costumes were decorated only with metal buttons (knefle). A set of jewellery of a wealthy woman consisted of a collar stud, orpant, hoczki and belt.

- Collar stud- used to fasten a collar of kabotek. The studs were of round or heart shape.
- Orpant- a piece of jewellery consisting of four chains which fall into semicircle. They were attached to braces of żywotek.
- Hoczki- metal items with small holes, which enable żywotek to be laced up. The wealthier woman, the more hoczki she had installed in her żywotek
- Belt- usually silver, most valuable item of jewellery. Its production required the greatest precision. Originally the belts consisted of small, profusely decorated silver plates, which were joined by a chain. In latter versions the technique of filigree was used.

== Bibliography ==
- B. Bazielich, Śląskie Stroje Ludowe. Katowice 1988
- M. Michalczyk, Hoczki, knefle, orpanty... Biżuteria cieszyńska w zbiorach Muzeum Śląskiego. Katowice 2007
- E. Piskorz- Branekova, Biżuteria Ludowa w Polsce. Warszawa 2008
- E. Piskorz- Branekova, Polskie Hafty i Koronki. Warszawa 2009
- E. Piskorz- Branekova, Polskie Stroje Ludowe. Warszawa 2009
