= Silesian-Lusatian Lowlands =

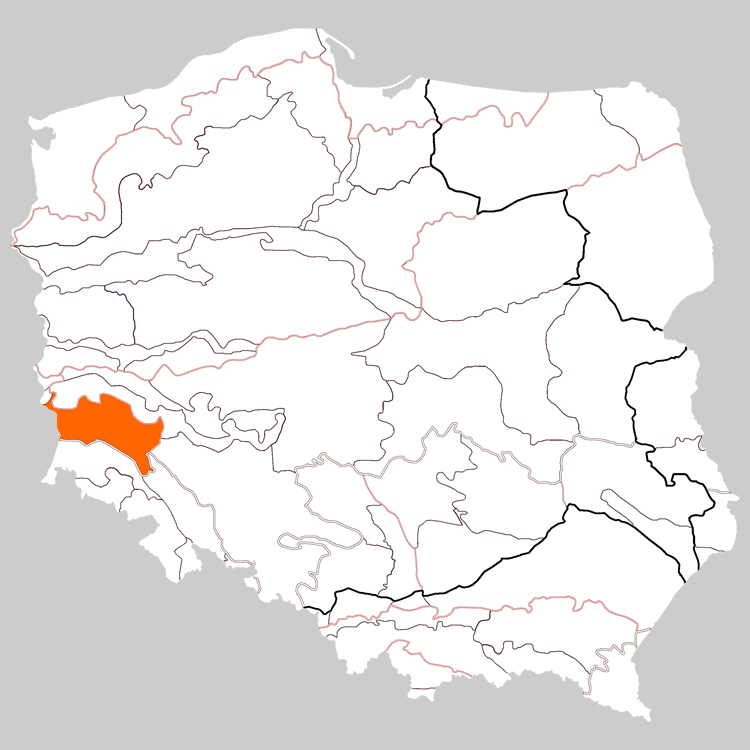
Silesian-Lusiatian Highlands in maps of Poland

Silesian-Lusatian Lowlands (or Silesian-Lusatian Uplands, Polish: Nizina Śląsko-Łużycka) are lowlands located in Silesia, Poland and Germany.

== See also ==
- Silesian Highlands
- Silesian Lowlands
- Silesian Foothills
- Silesian-Moravian Foothills
