= Silesian Upland =

Highland in Poland

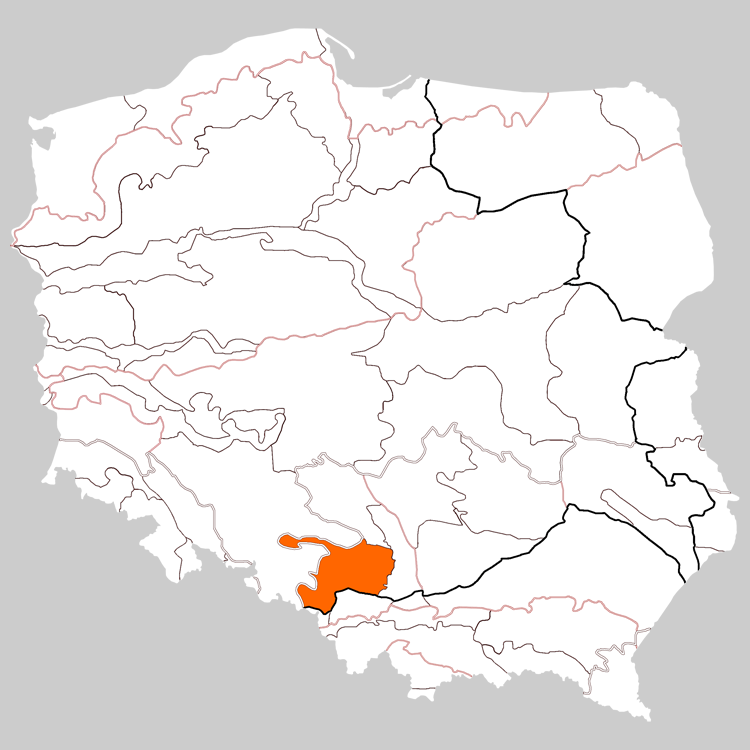
Silesian Highlands

Silesian Upland or Silesian Highland (Polish: Wyżyna Śląska) is a highland located in Silesia and Lesser Poland, Poland.

Its highest point is the St. Anne Mountain, which is 406 m (1,332 ft) high.

== See also ==
- Silesian Lowlands
- Silesian-Lusatian Lowlands
- Silesian Foothills
- Silesian-Moravian Foothills
