= Gmina Dębowiec, Silesian Voivodeship =

Gmina Dębowiec Dębowiec Commune
- Gmina
- Flag Coat of arms

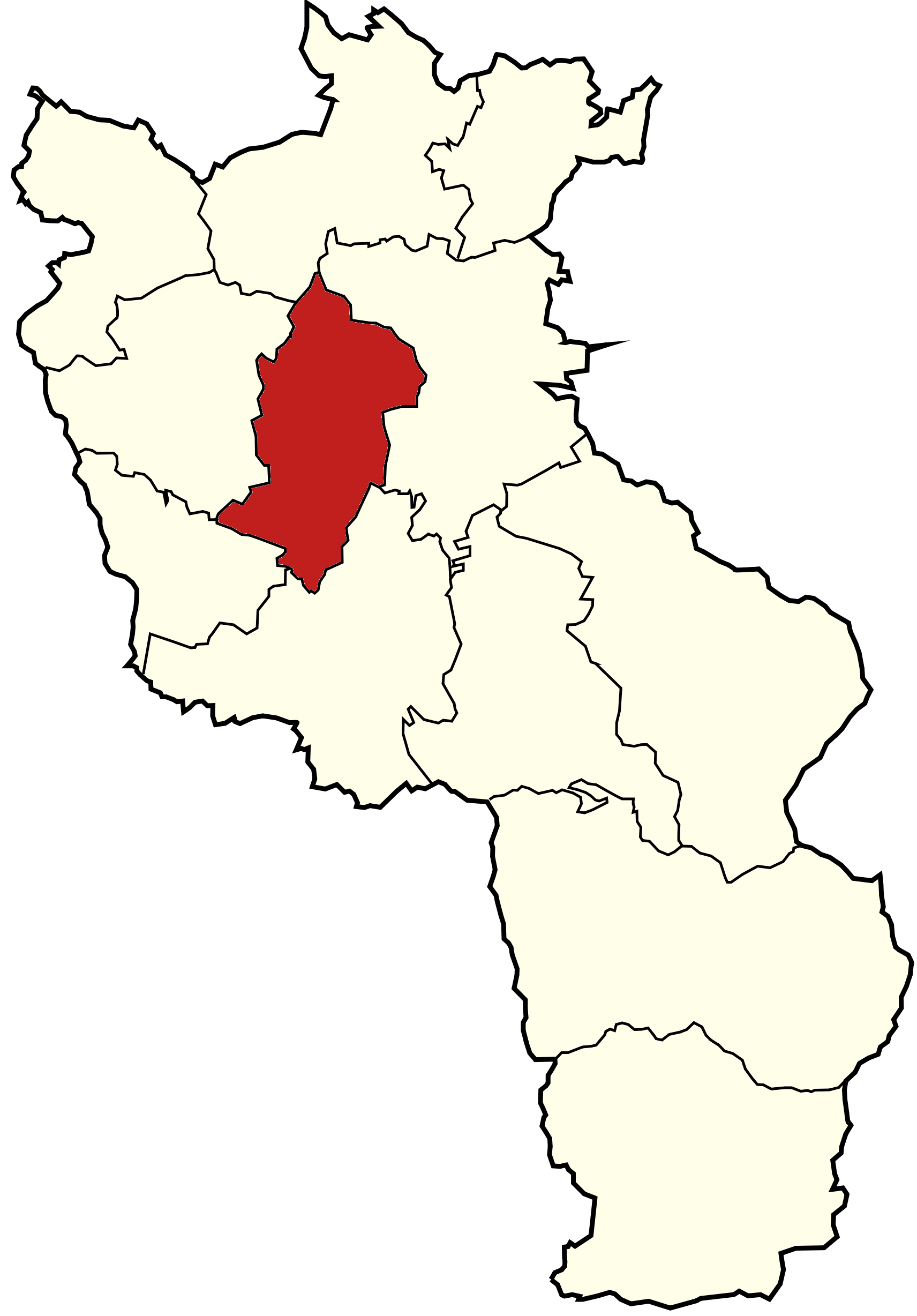
- Gmina Dębowiec within the Cieszyn County
- Coordinates (Dębowiec): 49°48′51″N 18°43′8″E
- Country: Poland
- Voivodeship: Silesian
- County: Cieszyn
- Seat: Dębowiec

Government
  - Mayor: Tomasz Michał Branny

Area
  - Total: 42.48 km^{2} (16.40 sq mi)

Population (2019-06-30)
  - Total: 5,818
  - Density: 137.0/km^{2} (354.7/sq mi)
- Website: http://www.debowiec.cieszyn.pl/

Gmina Dębowiec is a rural gmina (administrative district) in Cieszyn County, Silesian Voivodeship, in southern Poland, in the historical region of Cieszyn Silesia. Its seat is the village of Dębowiec.

The gmina covers an area of 42.48 square kilometres (16.4 sq mi), and as of 2019 its total population is 5,818.

== Villages ==
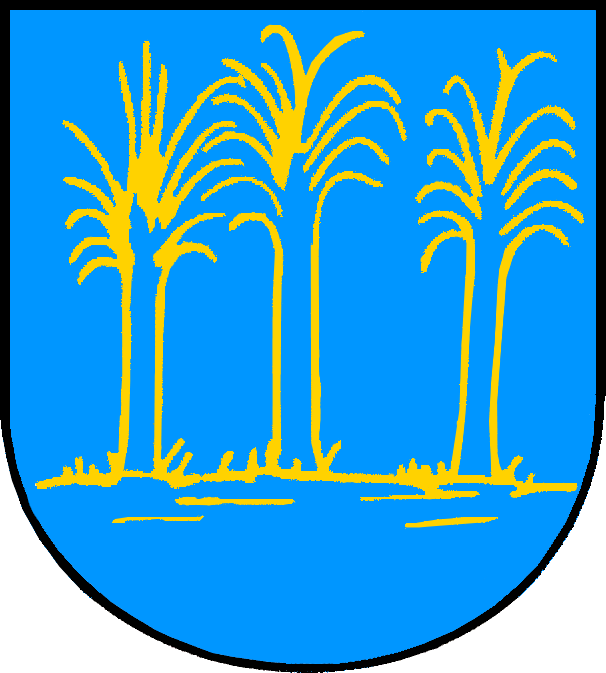
Dębowiec (seat)

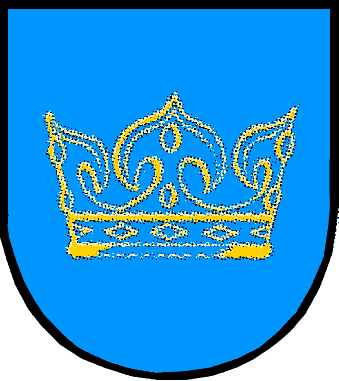
Gumna

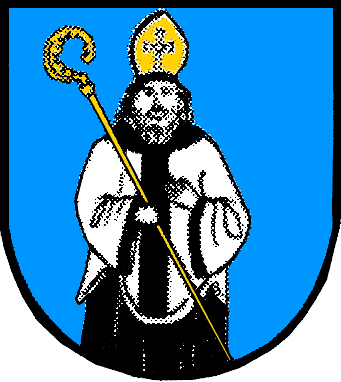
Iskrzyczyn

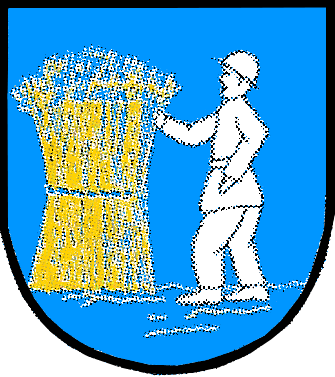
Kostkowice

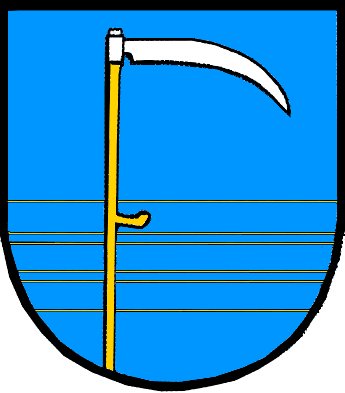
Łączka

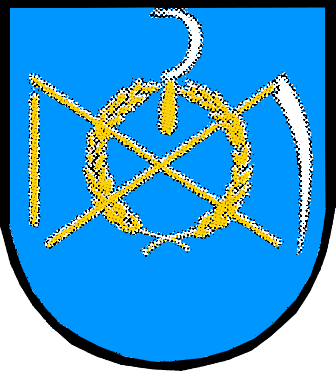
Ogrodzona

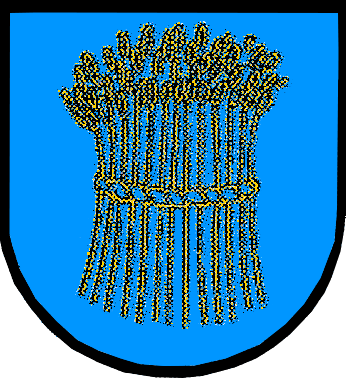
Simoradz

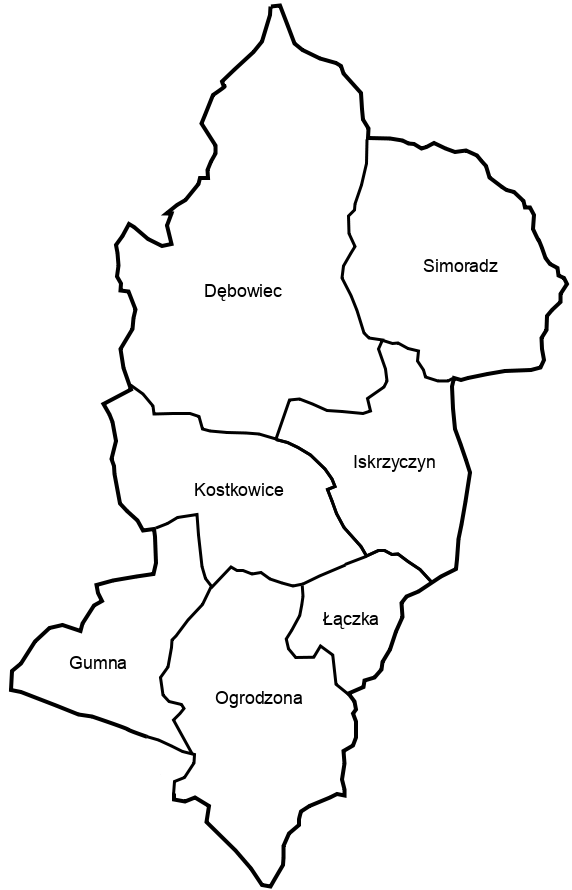
Division of the gmina

== Neighbouring gminas ==
Gmina Dębowiec is bordered by the gminas of Cieszyn, Goleszów, Hażlach, Skoczów and Strumień.
