= Knajka =

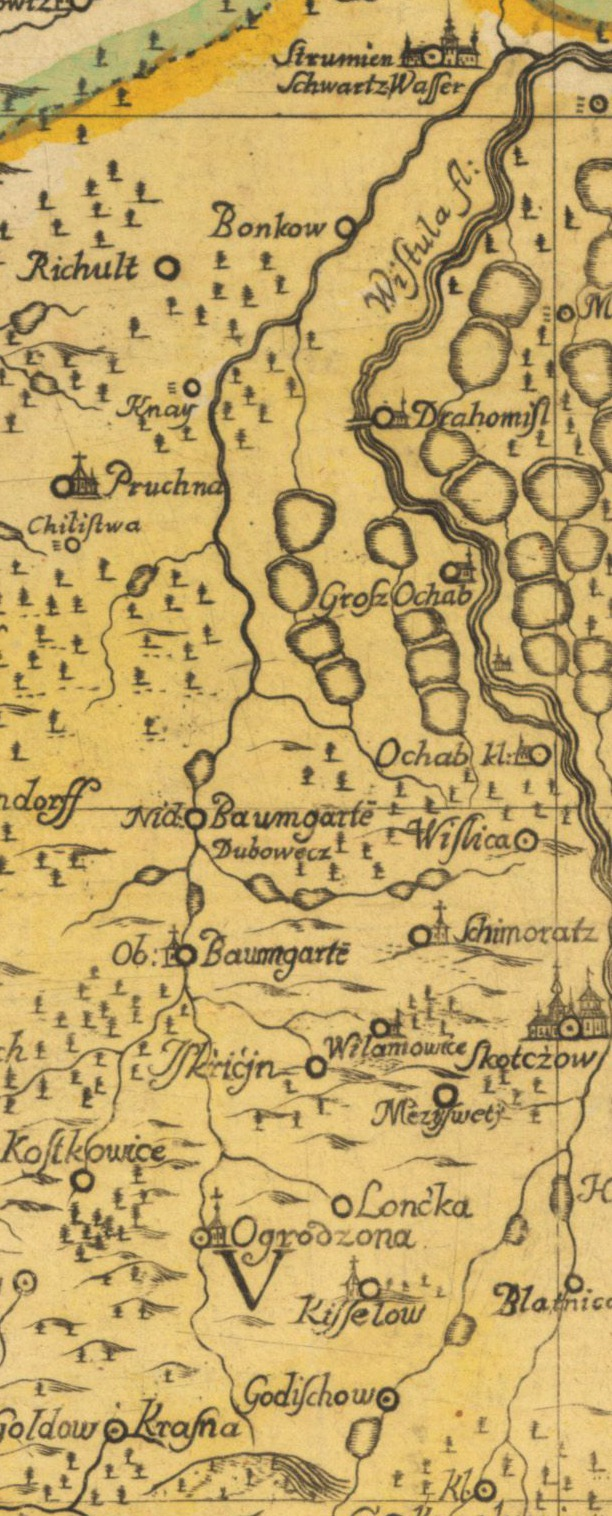
- Knajka on a map from 1724

Location
- Country: Poland

Physical characteristics
- Source
  - location: Chełm Hill, Silesian Foothills
  - elevation: 354 m (1,161 ft)
- Mouth
  - location: Vistula
  - coordinates: 49.9051°N 18.7584°E
- Length: 17 km (11 mi) or 19 km (12 mi)
- Basin size: 68.6 km^{2} (26.5 sq mi)

Basin features
- Progression: Vistula→ Baltic Sea

Knajka is a stream in the Cieszyn County, Silesian Voivodeship, Poland, in the historical region of Cieszyn Silesia. It is a left-bank tributary of the Vistula, which it enters just south of Strumień. Its length is variously said to be either 17 kilometres (11 mi) or 19 kilometres (12 mi). It flows through Ogrodzona, Kostkowice, Dębowiec, Knaj and Bąków. Numerous fish ponds are located alongside it.

The name of the river is derived from a word knieja denoting a wild, dense forest.

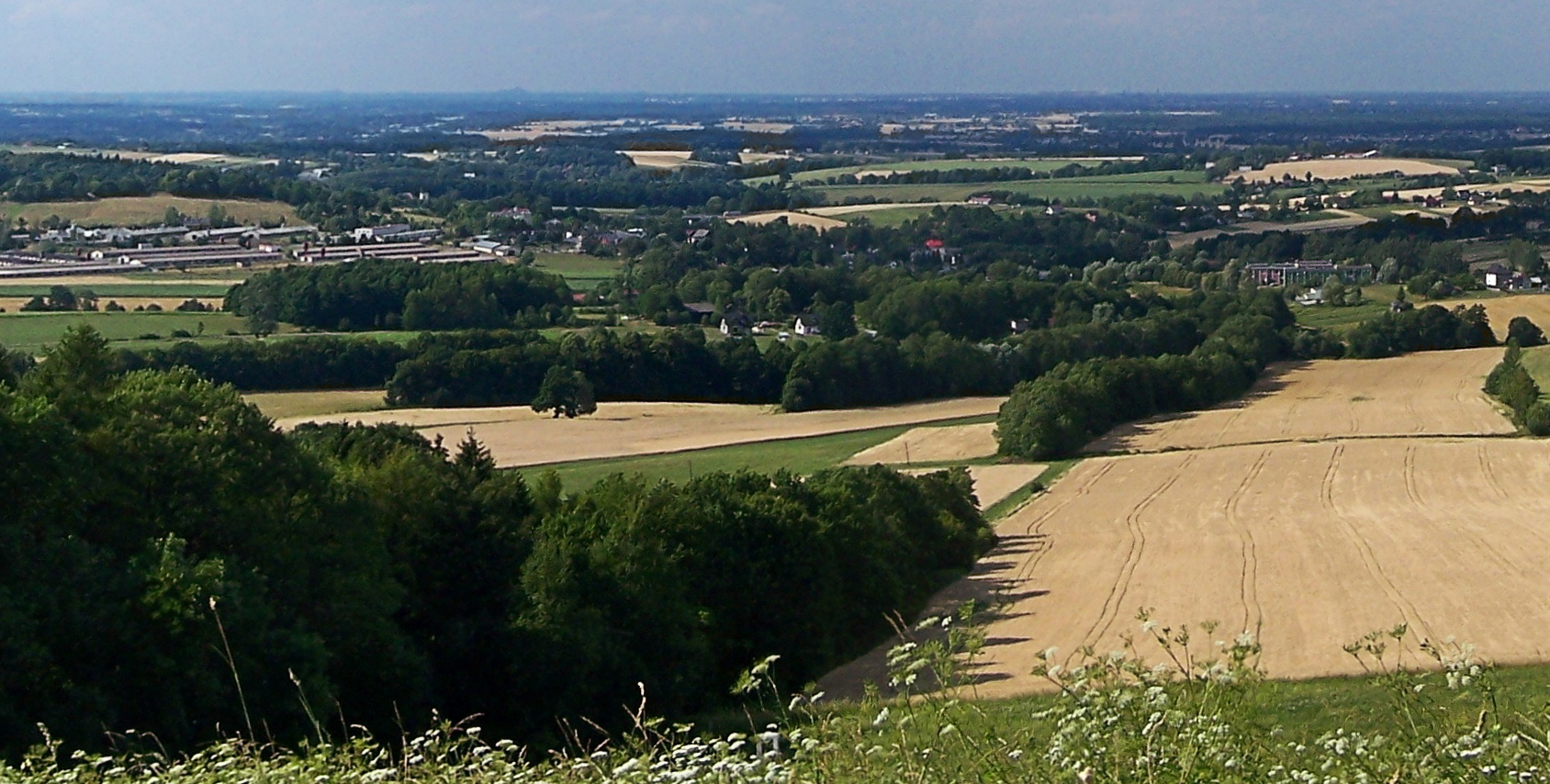
Headwaters area

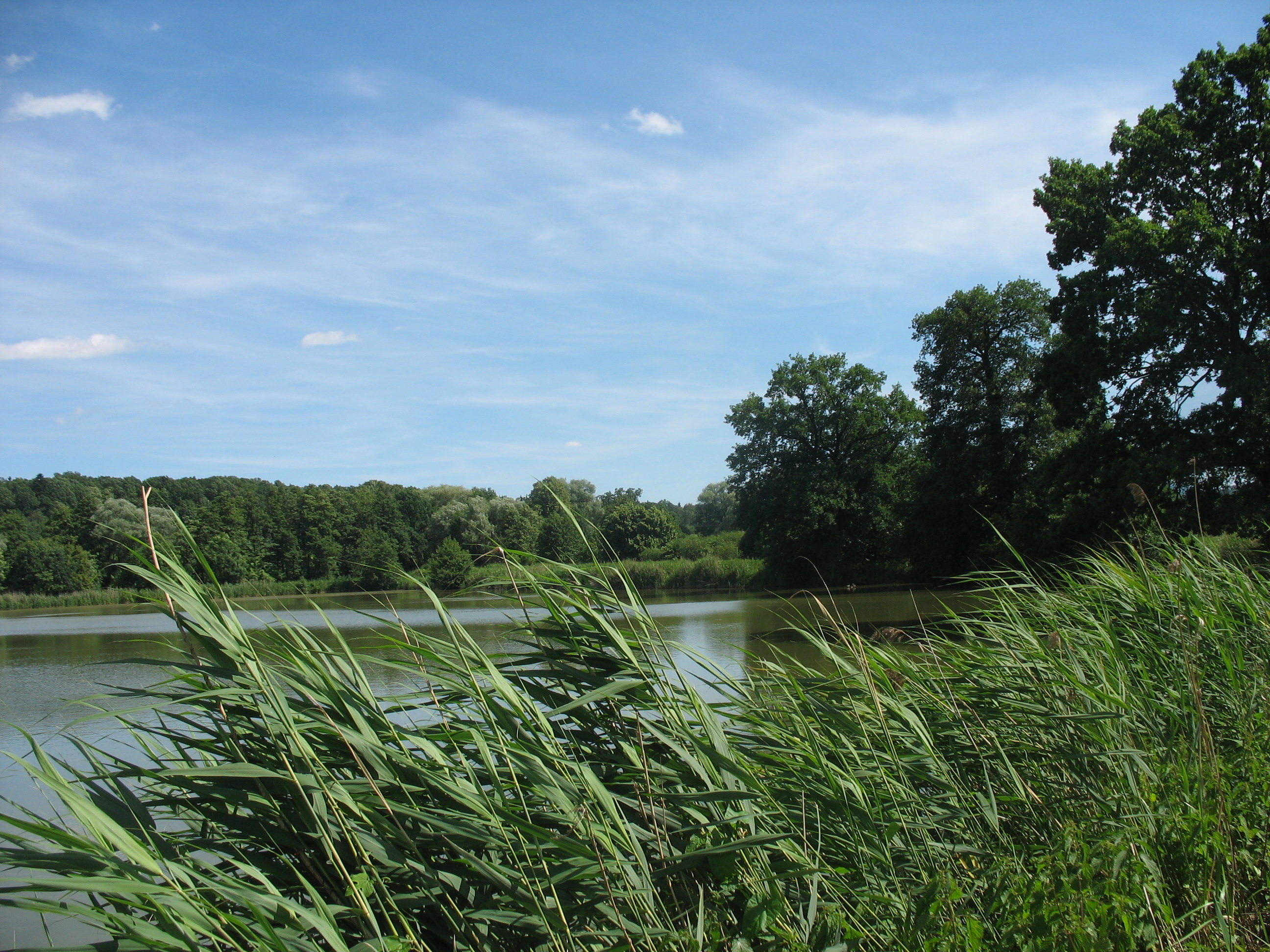
One of the fish ponds alongside the stream, in Dębowiec
