= Cieszyn Vlachs =

Silesian ethnographic group

Cieszyn Vlachs Wałasi cieszyńscy
Regions with significant populations
- Poland: Cieszyn Silesia; Czech Republic: Trans-Olza

Languages
- Polish, Silesian (Cieszyn Silesian)

Religion
- Roman Catholic, Lutheran

Related ethnic groups
- Other Silesians

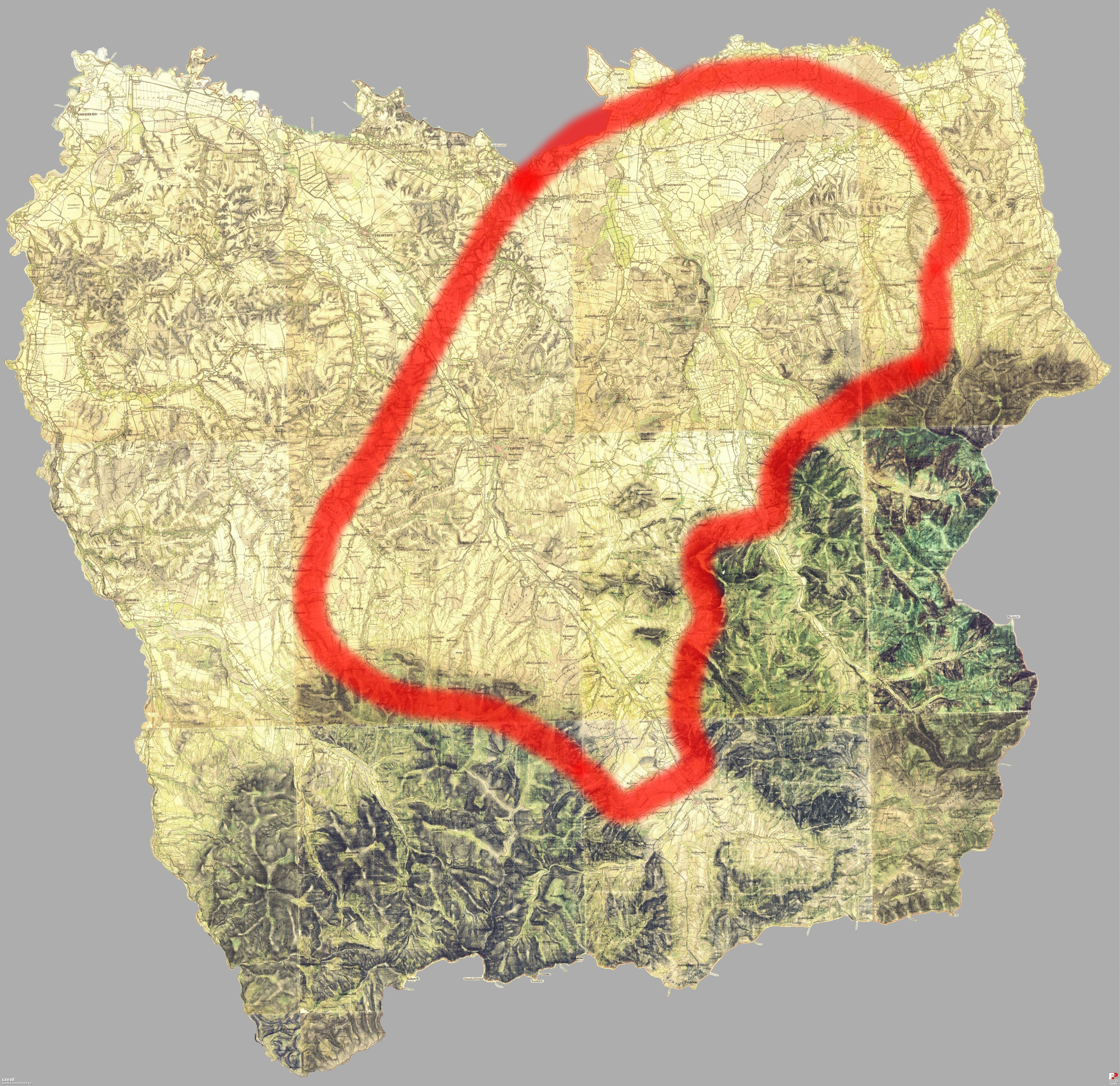
Approximate extent of Cieszyn Vlachs within Cieszyn Silesia

The Cieszyn Vlachs (Polish: Wałasi cieszyńscy, Czech: Těšínští Valaši) are a Silesian ethnographic group living around the towns of Cieszyn and Skoczów, one of the four major ethnographic groups in Cieszyn Silesia, the one mostly associated with wearing Cieszyn folk costume but not the only one speaking Cieszyn Silesian dialect. The name, "Vlachs" (Polish: Wołosi/Wałasi), is probably not directly associated with that group (as Gorals are) but was coined by adjacent groups as a nickname.

The culture of this group blossomed in the second half of the 19th century. The exact extent of its habitat is hard to determine due to overlapping of various cultural elements with adjacent groups, especially on the borderlands. Cieszyn Vlachs dwell on Silesian Foothills and on the north-western slopes of Silesian Beskids in the watershed of Vistula and Olza rivers, within Cieszyn Silesia (also in the Trans-Olza region). Their neighbours include Silesian Lachs to north west, and Silesian Gorals to south.

== Gallery ==
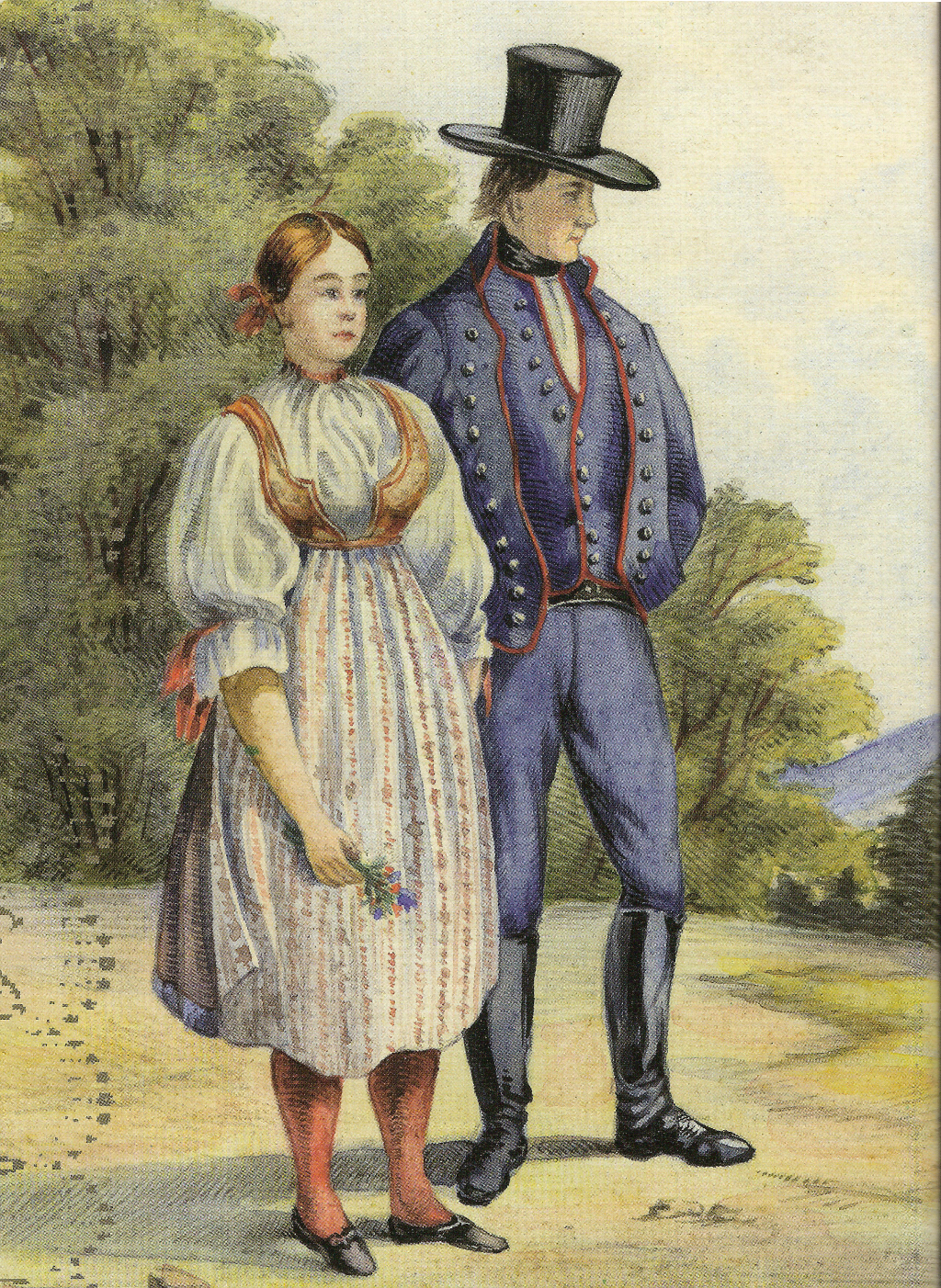
Jakub Alt: "Around Cieszyn" (1840)

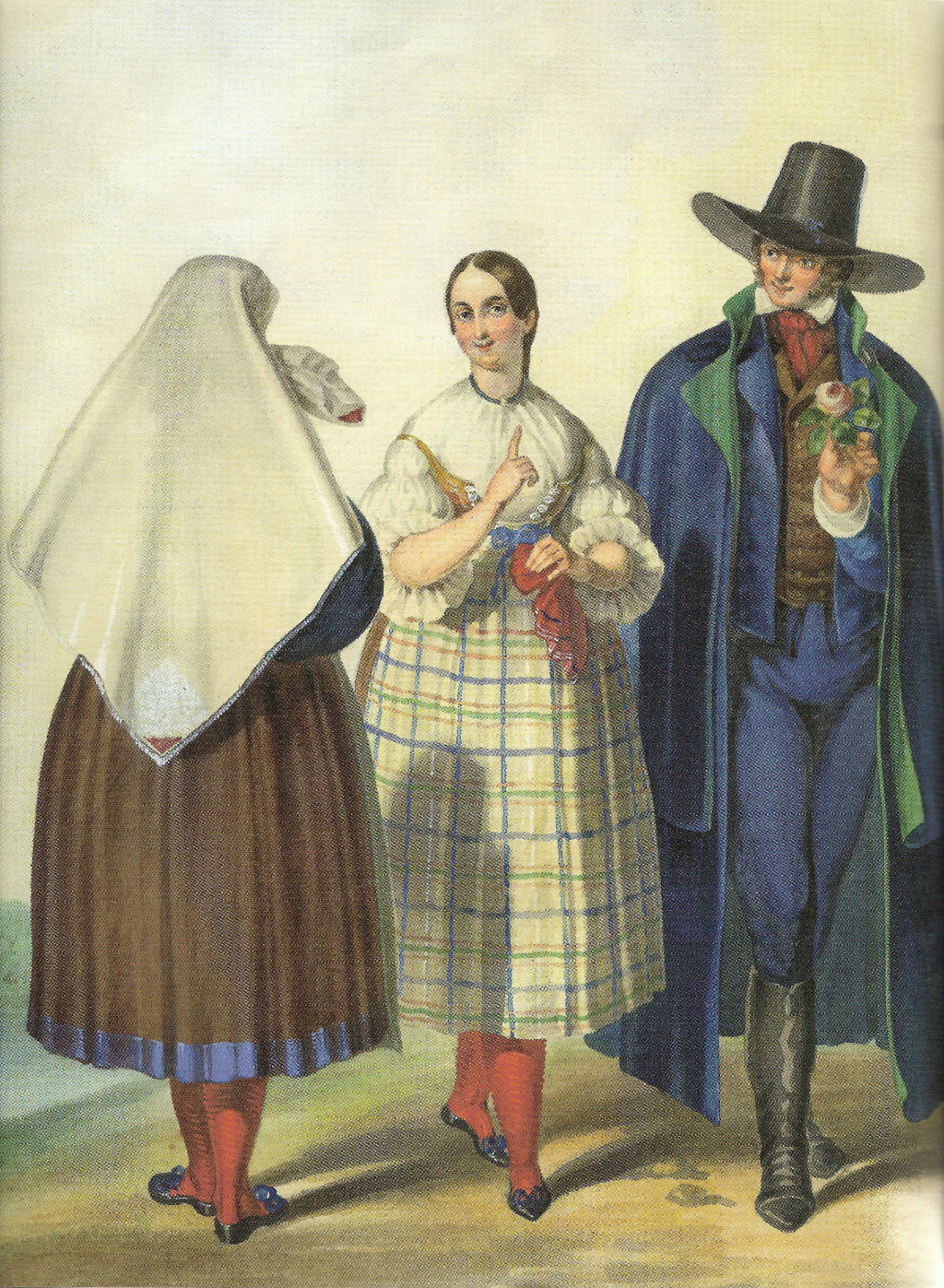
Henryk Jastrzembski: peasants from around Cieszyn (1846)

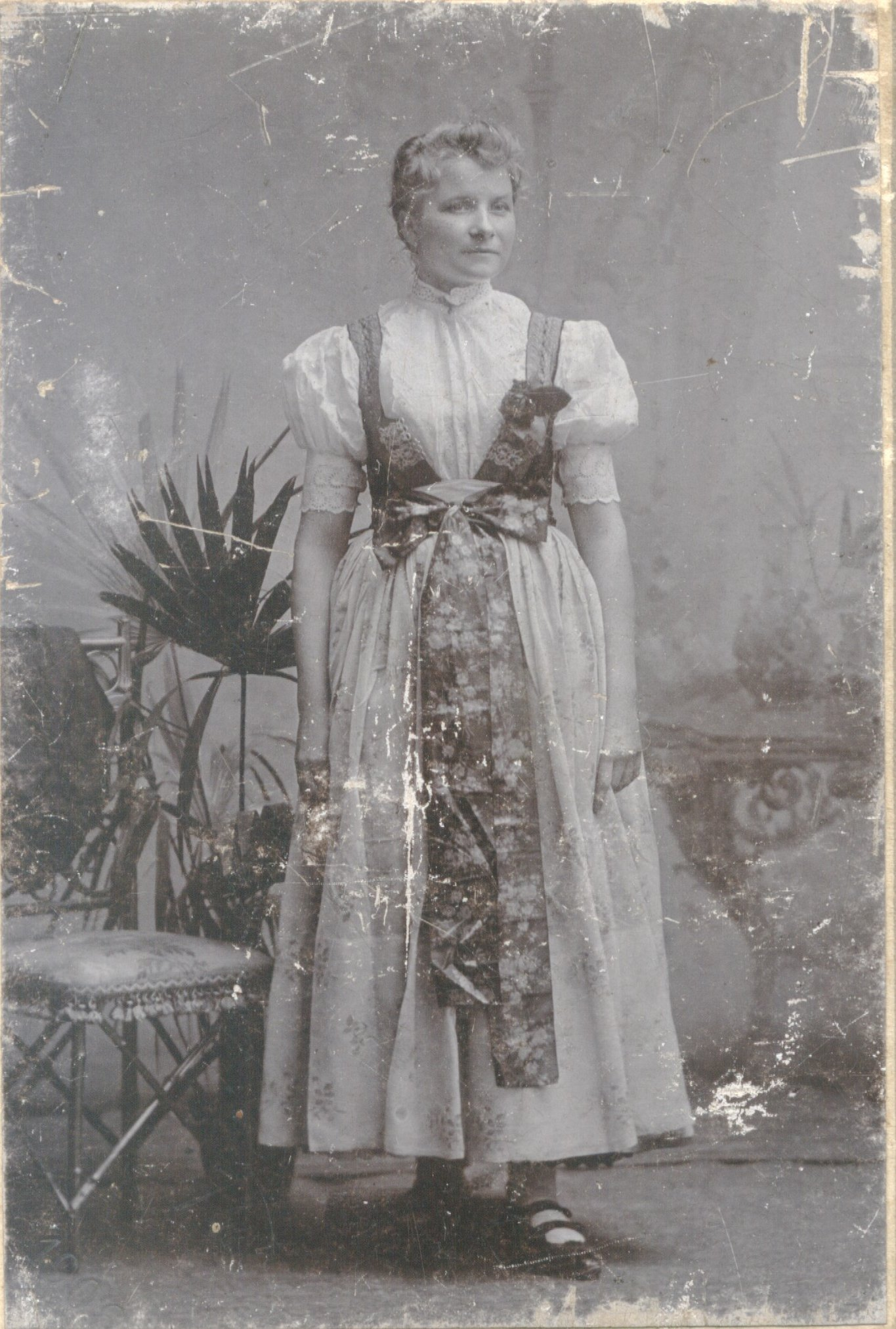
A woman in Cieszyn folk costume (1914)

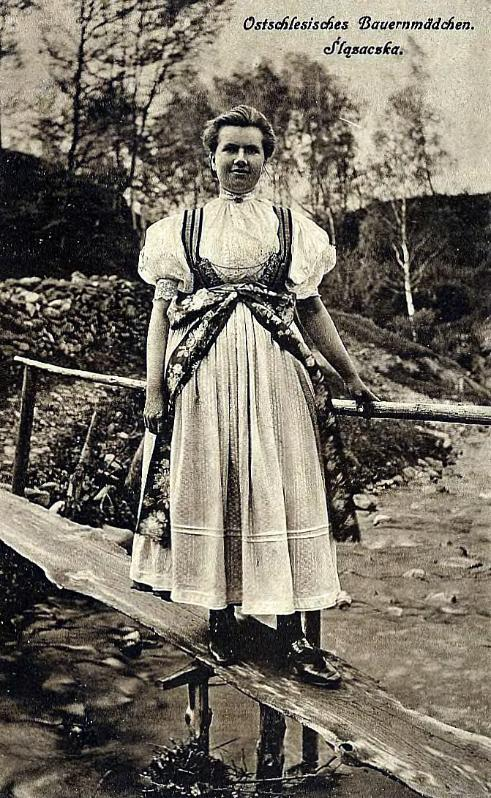
A woman in Cieszyn folk costume

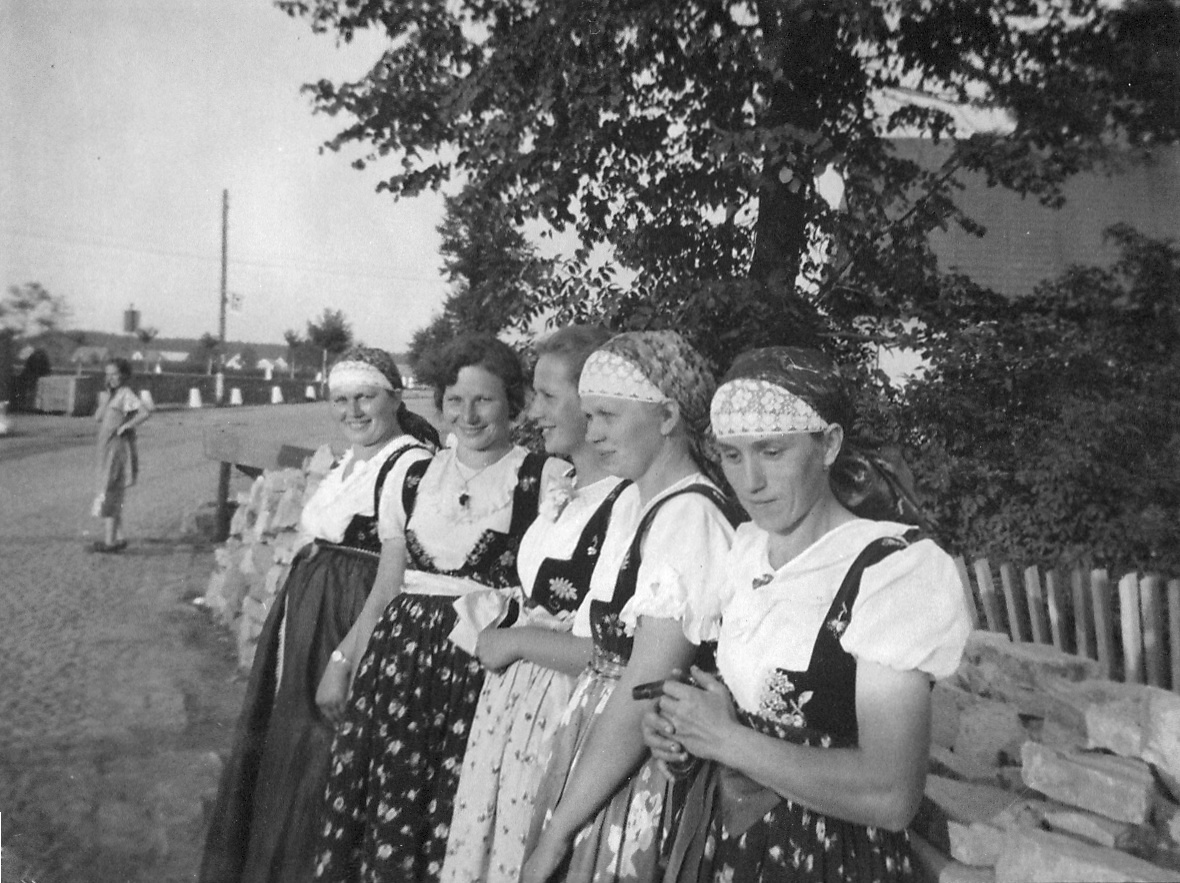
Women in folk costumes in Skoczów (1938)

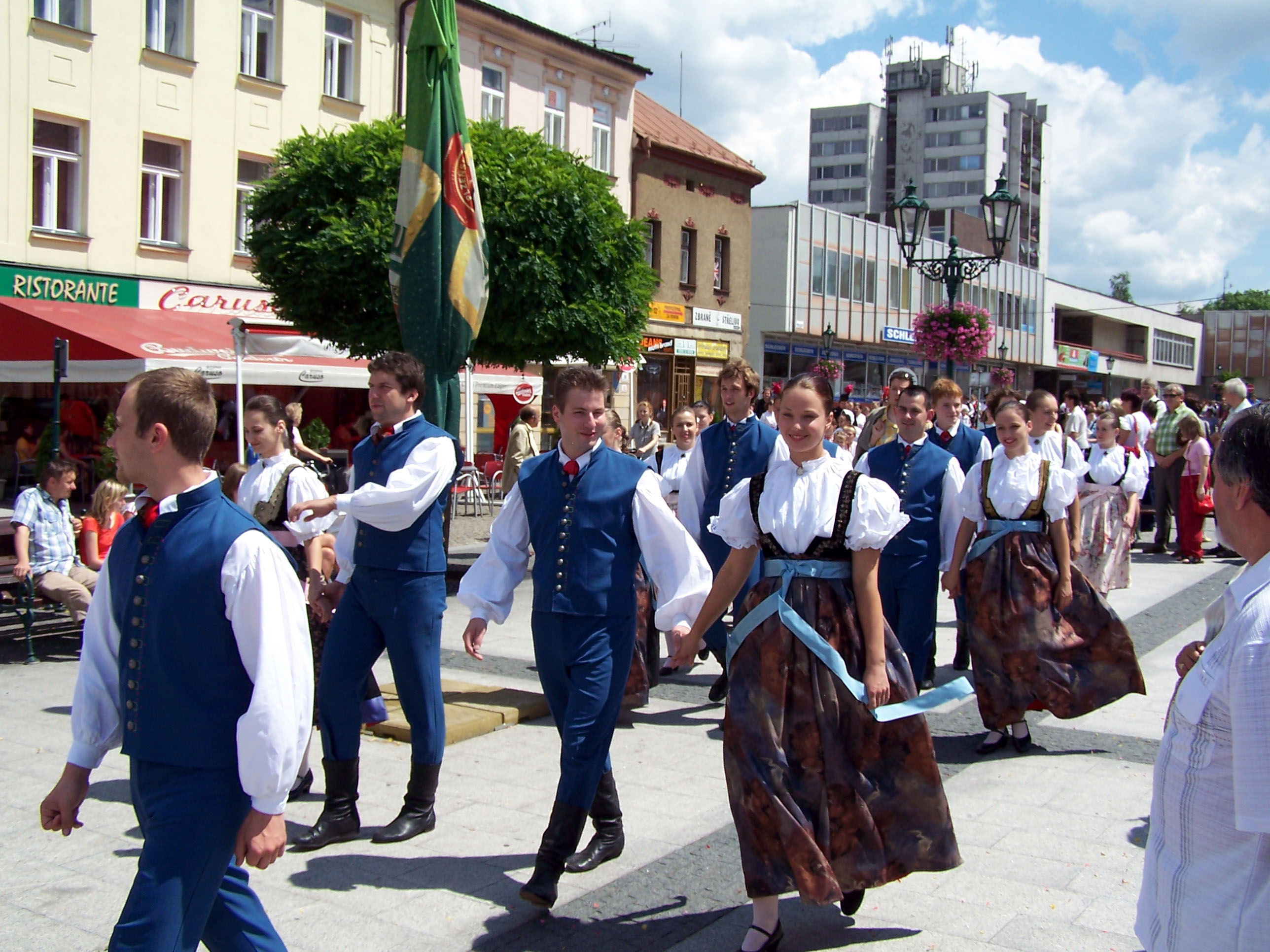
Olza folklore group on a parade

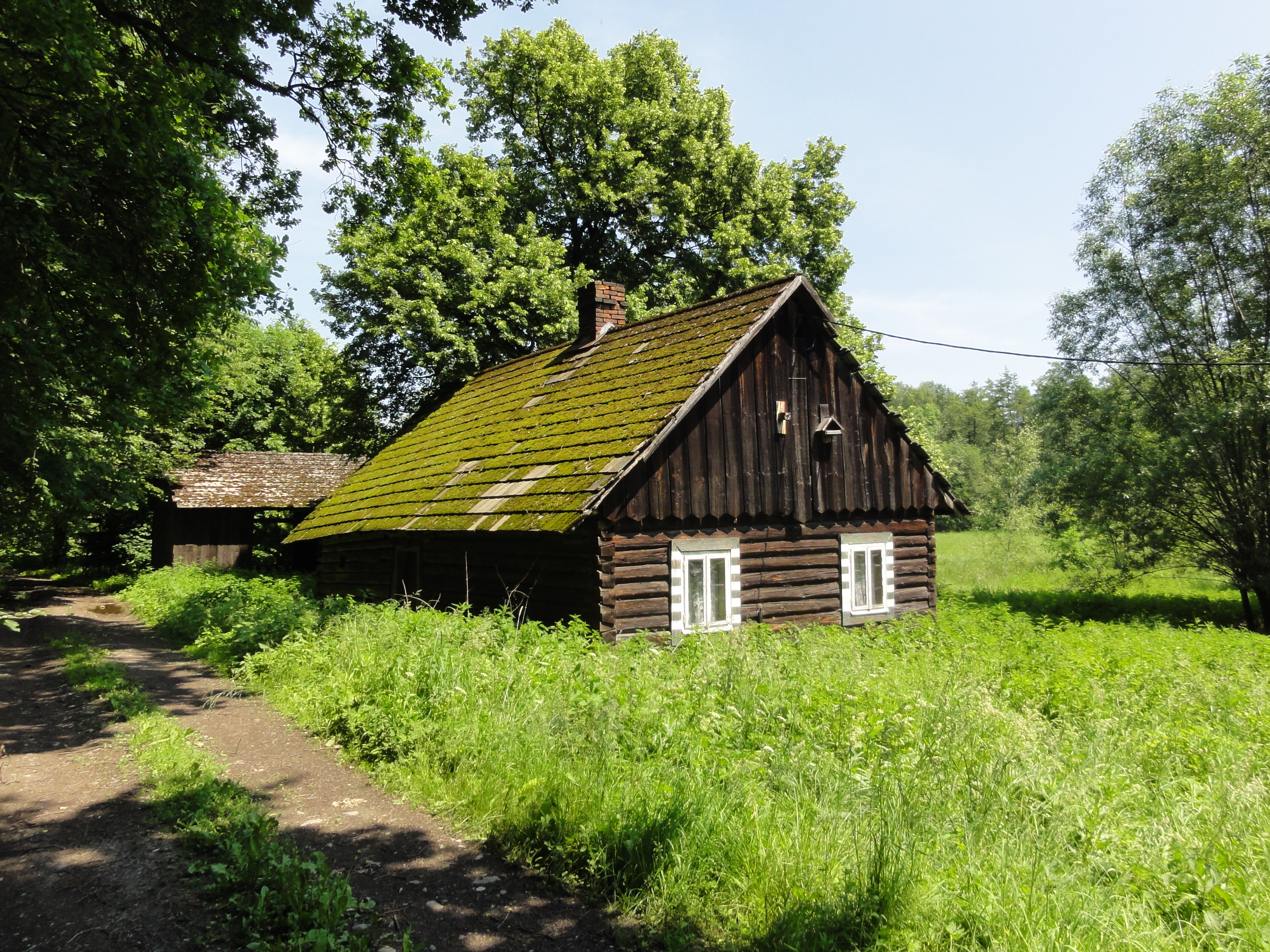
A traditional wooden house of Cieszyn Vlach in Dębowiec
