= Silesian Foothills =

Foothills in Silesian Voivodeship, Poland

Coordinates: 49°50′N 19°2′E

Silesian Foothills, marked in red and labeled with D2

Silesian Foothills (Polish: Pogórze Śląskie, Czech: Slezské podhůří, Silesian: Pogōrze Ślōnske) are foothills located in Silesian Voivodeship, Poland.

It has an area of 545 km^{2}. Its western border is Olza river, eastern Skawa. Other main rivers that cut the foothills are from west to east: Vistula, Biała and Soła. To the south are Silesian Beskids and Little Beskids, in north it converts into Ostrava Basin and Oświęcim Basin. The towns located on the foothills are: Cieszyn, Skoczów, Bielsko-Biała, Kęty, Andrychów and Wadowice.

== See also ==
- Silesian Highlands
- Silesian Lowlands
- Silesian-Lusatian Lowlands
- Silesian-Moravian Foothills
