= Lutheran Diocese of Cieszyn =

Diocese of Cieszyn Diecezja cieszyńska
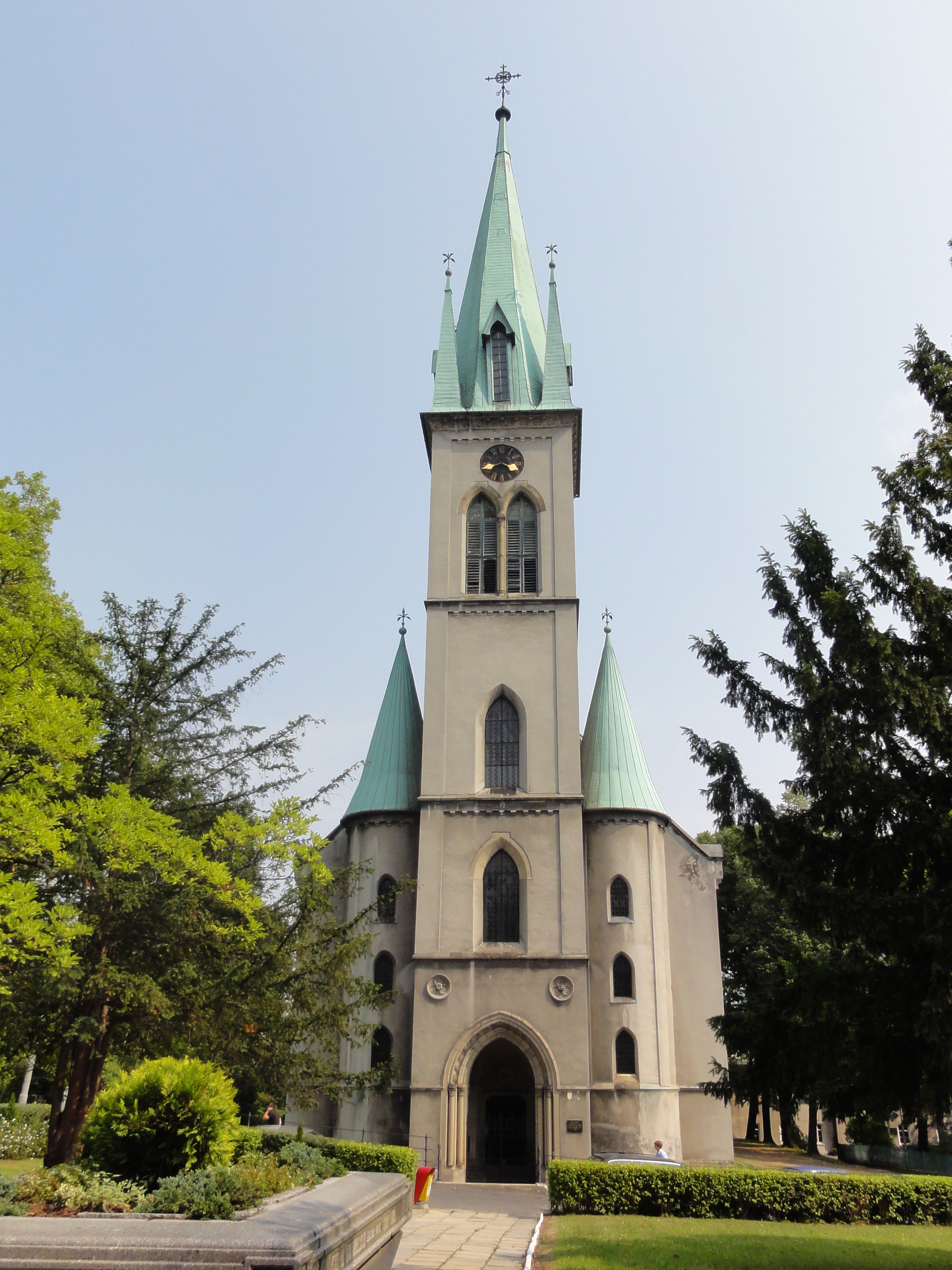
- Church in Bielsko-Biała

Location
- Country: Poland
- Headquarters: Bielsko-Biała

Statistics
- Parishes: 22
- Denomination: Evangelical Church of the Augsburg Confession in Poland

Current leadership
- Bishop: Adrian Korczago

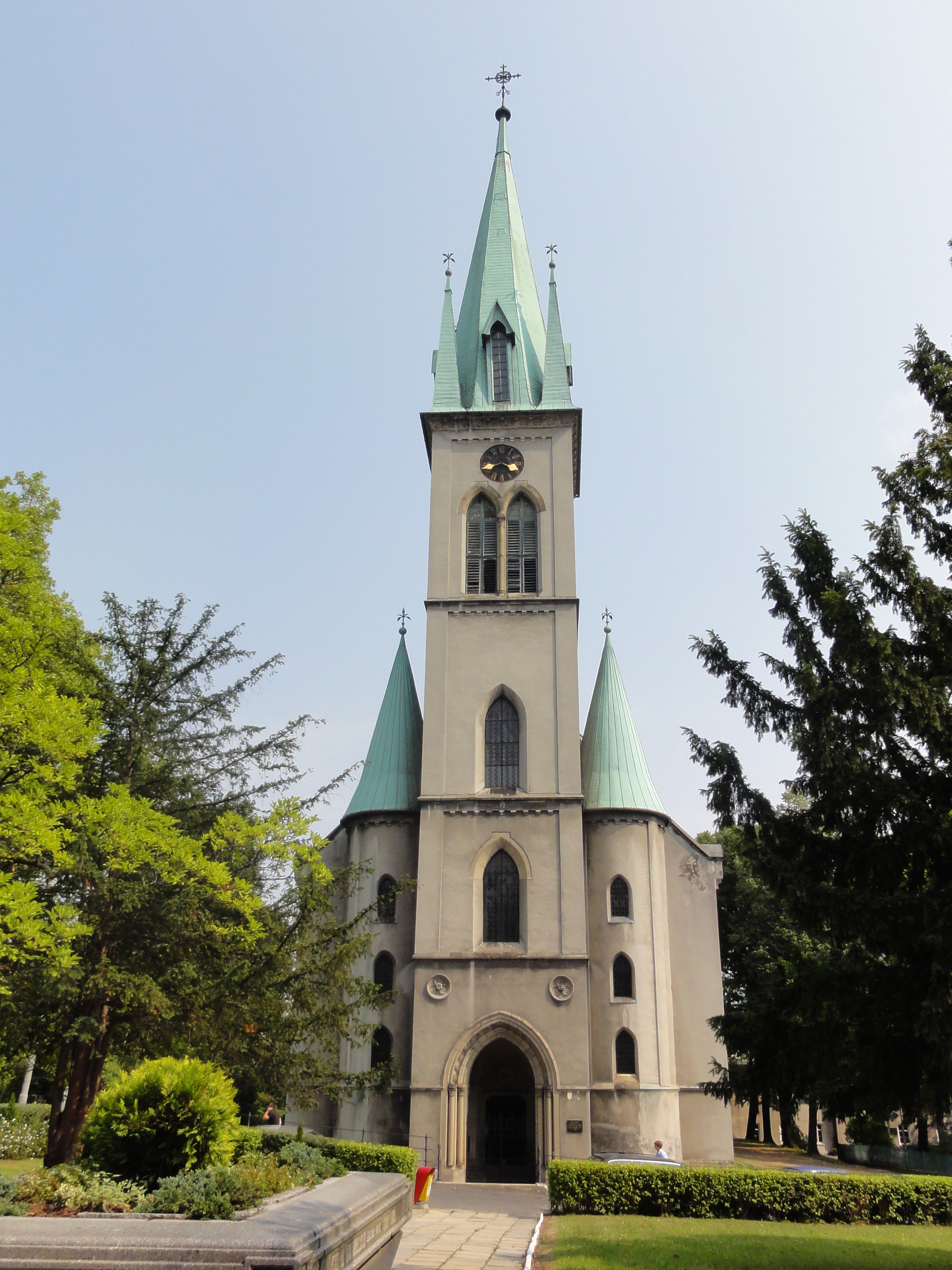
Saviour Church in Bielsko-Biała

The Diocese of Cieszyn is the smallest diocese of the six which constitute the Polish Lutheran Church. The Bishop's See is Cieszyn, but the diocese is headquartered in Bielsko-Biała.

== Location ==
The Diocese of Cieszyn comprises Bielsko County and Cieszyn County in Silesian Voivodship, mostly encompassing the Polish part of the historical region of Cieszyn Silesia (only the parish in Biała lies without historical Cieszyn Silesia).

== History ==
Cieszyn Silesia was historically inhabited by a large Lutheran minority since the 16th century. A structure of parishes within Austrian Lutheran Church was established after issuing the Patent of Toleration in 1781. After World War I, the fall of Austria-Hungary, the Polish–Czechoslovak War, and the division of Cieszyn Silesia in 1920, the parishes that became a part of the Second Polish Republic joined the Polish Lutheran Church, first as a seniority, then in 1936 formally constituted as a diocese.

== List of bishops ==
- Paweł Nikodem : 1937~1954
  - Vacant (1954~1957)
- Adam Wegert : 1957~1980
- Jan Szarek : 1980~1991
- Paweł Anweiler : 1992~2016
- Adrian Korczago : 2016~

== List of parishes ==
22 parishes belong to the Diocese of Cieszyn:

Parish	Established	Churches	Photo
Biała (Bielsko-Biała)	1781	Marthin Luther Church in Bielsko-Biała; Filial church in Salmopol;	Marthin Luther Church in Bielsko-Biała
Bielsko (Bielsko-Biała)	1782	Saviour Church in Bielsko-Biała;	Saviour Church in Bielsko-Biała
Stare Bielsko (Bielsko-Biała)	1814	John the Baptist Church in Bielsko-Biała; Filial church in Kamienica (Bielsko-Biała)	John the Baptist Church in Bielsko-Biała
Bładnice	2000	Lutheran church in Bładnice	
Brenna-Górki	1992	Lutheran church in Brenna; Filial church in Górki;	
Cieszyn	1709	Jesus Church in Cieszyn; Filial churches or chapels in Bażanowice, Gumna, Hażlach, Krasna, Marklowice, Ogrodzona, Puńców and Zamarski	
Cisownica	1986	Lutheran church in Cisownica;	
Czechowice-Dziedzice		Lutheran church in Czechowice-Dziedzice;	
Dzięgielów	2005	Lutheran church in Dzięgielów;	
Drogomyśl	1788	Lutheran church in Drogomyśl; Filial churches in Pruchna and Bąków;	
Goleszów	1785	Lutheran church in Goleszów; Filial churches or chapels in Godziszów, Kisielów, Kozakowice Dolne and Leszna Górna;	
Istebna	1999	Lutheran church in Istebna;	
Jaworze	1782	Lutheran church in Jaworze; Filial churches in Jasienica, Wapienica and Świętoszówka	
Międzyrzecze	1864	Lutheran church in Międzyrzecze Górne; Filial church in Mazańcowice	
Skoczów	1866	Lutheran church in Skoczów; Filial churches in Dębowiec, Pierściec and Simoradz	
Ustroń	1785	Lutheran church in Ustroń; Filial churches in Dobka, Polana and Lipowiec	
Wieszczęta-Kowale	1994	Lutheran church in Wieszczęta;	
Wisła-Centrum	1782	Lutheran church in Wisła;	
Wisła-Czarne	1994	Lutheran church in Wisła-Czarne;	
Wisła-Głębce	1994	Lutheran church in Wisła-Głębce;	
Wisła-Jawornik	1994	Lutheran church in Wisła-Jawornik;	
Wisła-Malinka	1994	Lutheran church in Wisła-Malinka;	
