= Goleszów–Wisła Głębce railway =

Railway line in Poland

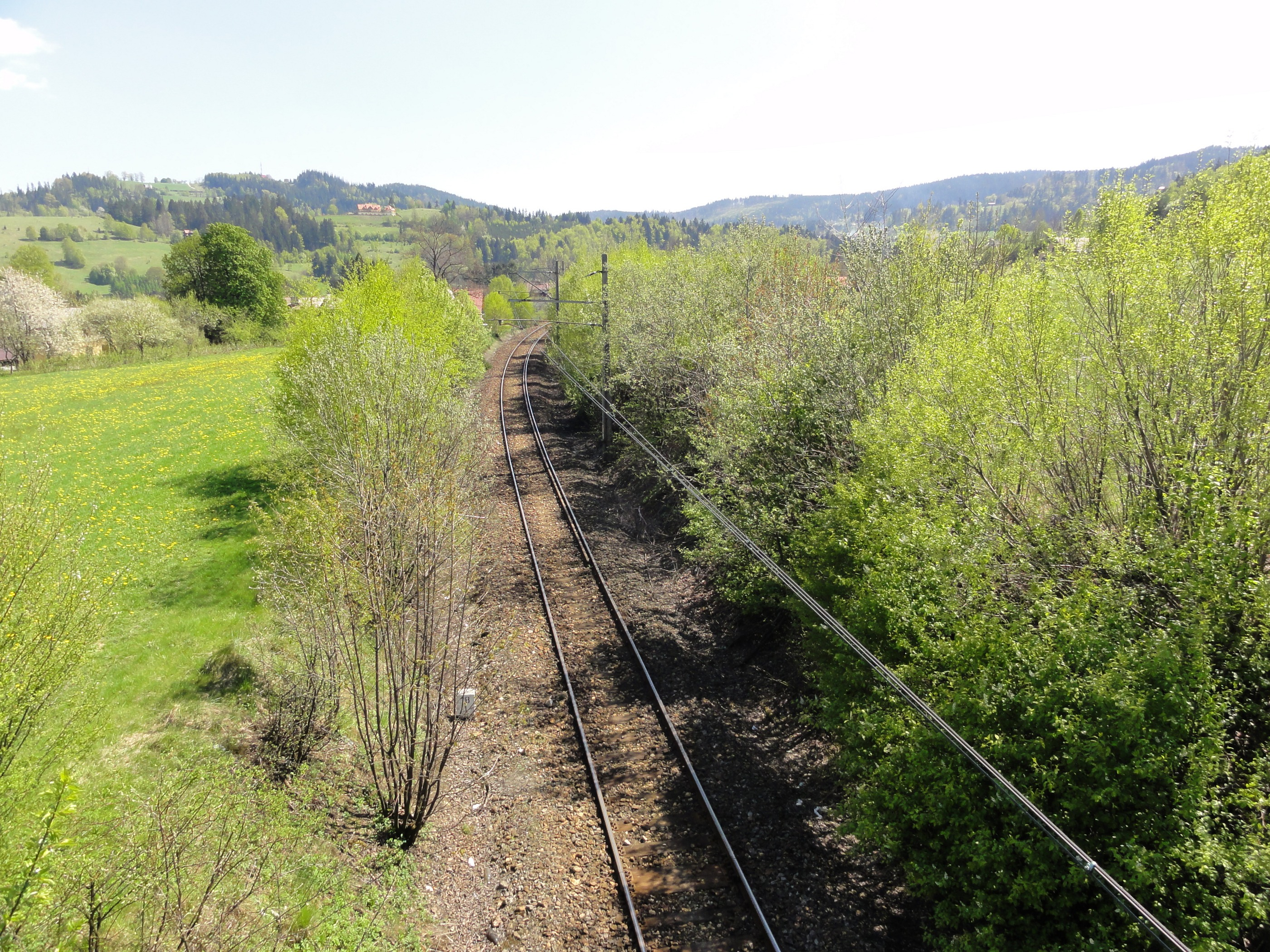

Overview
- Owner: PKP Polskie Linie Kolejowe
- Locale: Silesian Voivodeship
- Termini: Goleszów; Wisła Głębce

Service
- Route number: PKP 191

History
- Opened: 1888–1933

Technical
- Track length: 20,048 km
- Track gauge: 1,435 mm (4 ft 8 1/2 in)
- Operating speed: 70–80 km/h (43–50 mph)

The Goleszów–Wisła Głębce railway is a single-track, electrified railway line running in the Silesian Voivodeship, and as such serving as the main line between Goleszów and Wisła in Poland.

== History ==
=== Pre World War II ===
The line connecting Goleszów and the steelworks in Ustroń was established in 1888 and belonged to Railways of Silesian and Galician Cities. Subsequent sections were built after World War I in the reborn Second Polish Republic. On 15 March 1928, the 6.76 km (4.20 mi) section between Ustroń and Polana opened, on 10 July 1929 Polana - Wisła (now Wisła Uzdrowisko, length 2.74 km (1.70 mi)) and on 11 September 1933 Wisła - Wisła Głębce (5.2 km (3.2 mi)). On the latter, the company of engineer Ksawery Goryanowicz in the years 1931–1933 built a seven-span concrete railway viaduct with a length of 122 m (400 ft) and a maximum height of pillars of 25 m (82 ft). The line was to be extended to Zwardoń (via Koniaków), but the outbreak of World War II prevented the implementation of these plans.

=== Post World War II ===
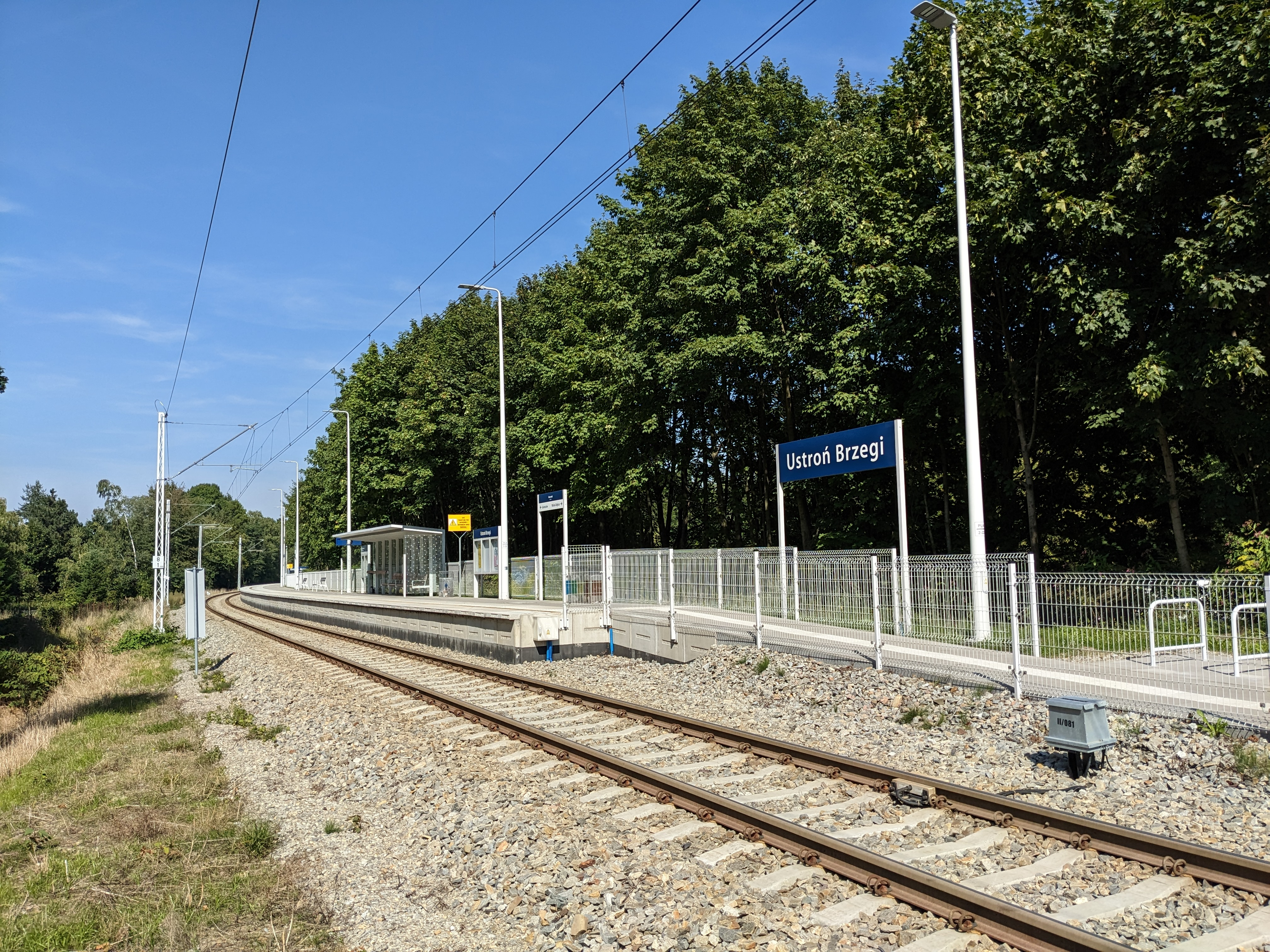
Ustroń Brzegi railway station

After World War II, due to the destruction of the bridge over the Vistula river by the retreating German army, until 28 May 1946, traffic on the line was carried out only to the stop in Obłaźec. The line was fully electrified in December 1974 making Poland's electrified railway lines at 5,000 km (3,100 mi) in length.

From March 2021 to November 2022, a comprehensive revitalization of the line was carried out. Two new railway stations: Ustroń Brzegi and Wisła Jawornik, were opened on 11 December 2022.
