= Jan Szarek =

Polish Lutheran bishop (1936–2020)

- Senior Bishop
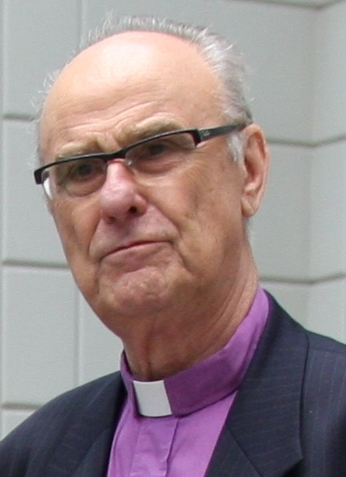
- Szarek
- Church: Evangelical-Augsburg Church in Poland
- Elected: 6 January 1991
- In office: 1991–2001
- Predecessor: Janusz Narzyński
- Successor: Janusz Jagucki

Orders
- Ordination: 25 September 1960 by Andrzej Wantuła
- Consecration: 3 May 1991 by Janusz Narzyński

Personal details
- Born: 13 February 1936 Bielsko, Poland
- Died: 8 October 2020 (aged 84) Cieszyn, Poland
- Education: Christian Theological Academy in Warsaw

Jan Szarek (13 February 1936 – 8 October 2020) was a Polish bishop of the Evangelical-Augsburg Church in Poland. He was also the head of the Polish Ecumenical Council from 1993 to 2001. He held an honorary doctorate from the Christian Theological Academy in Warsaw.

== Biography ==
Szarek was born in Bielsko and raised in the Lutheran faith. From 1956 to 1960 he studied theology at the Christian Theological Academy, which he completed with the defense of the thesis entitled "The life and activity of Tomasz Muenzer and his attitude to the reformation of Martin Luther." He was ordained a priest by Bishop Andrzej Wantuła on 25 September 1960 in the Church of the Savior in Bielsko-Biała.

After his ordination Szarek became the vicar of the parish in Nawiady from 1960 to 1962. From 1962 to 1970 he was the head of the Lutheran parish in Giżycko, and later from 1970 to 1975 he served as the diocesan vicar in Bielsko-Biała, where in 1975 he was elected as the second parish priest. In 1979 he was entrusted with the function of the Consignor of the Cieszyn Diocese, and in December 1980 he was elected the bishop of the Diocese. In this position, he established the first Evangelical bookstore "Logos" in Cieszyn and contributed to the construction of the Augustana Publishing Center, which opened in 1992. On 6 January 1991, the Synod of the Church elected him the Bishop of the Church. On 3 May 1991 at the Holy Trinity Church in Warsaw he was consecrated as the bishop of the Evangelical-Augsburg Church in Poland, he was consecrated by his predecessor Bishop Janusz Narzyński.

In 1993 Szarek was elected president of the Polish Ecumenical Council for a five-year term. In 1996 he was re-elected to this position. He met three times with Pope John Paul II: in Warsaw in 1991, in Wrocław in 1997, and in Drohiczyn in 1999.

As a representative of the Church in Poland, he participated in the General Assemblies of the World Lutheran Federation and the World Council of Churches. Throughout his life Szarek was associated with the so-called social movement in Polish Evangelicalism, following in the example of Karol Kulisz.

In March 2000, the Synod elected him the first president of the Polish Diakonia. He held this position until 2005, when he was replaced by Bishop Ryszard Bogusz.

In 2001, he received an honorary doctorate from the Christian Academy of Theology in Warsaw.

Szarek was married to Aniela, an economist who worked as the head of a department of the National Bank of Poland. Aniela was also the author of articles in the pages of the Evangelical Herald and the Evangelical Calendar. The couple had two children, a son Piotr and a daughter Ewa. Piotr is also a Lutheran priest like his father. Aniela died on 5 January 2019.

Szarek died from COVID-19 on 8 October 2020, during the COVID-19 pandemic in Poland.
