= Goleszów railway station =

Railway station in Silesia, Poland

Goleszów
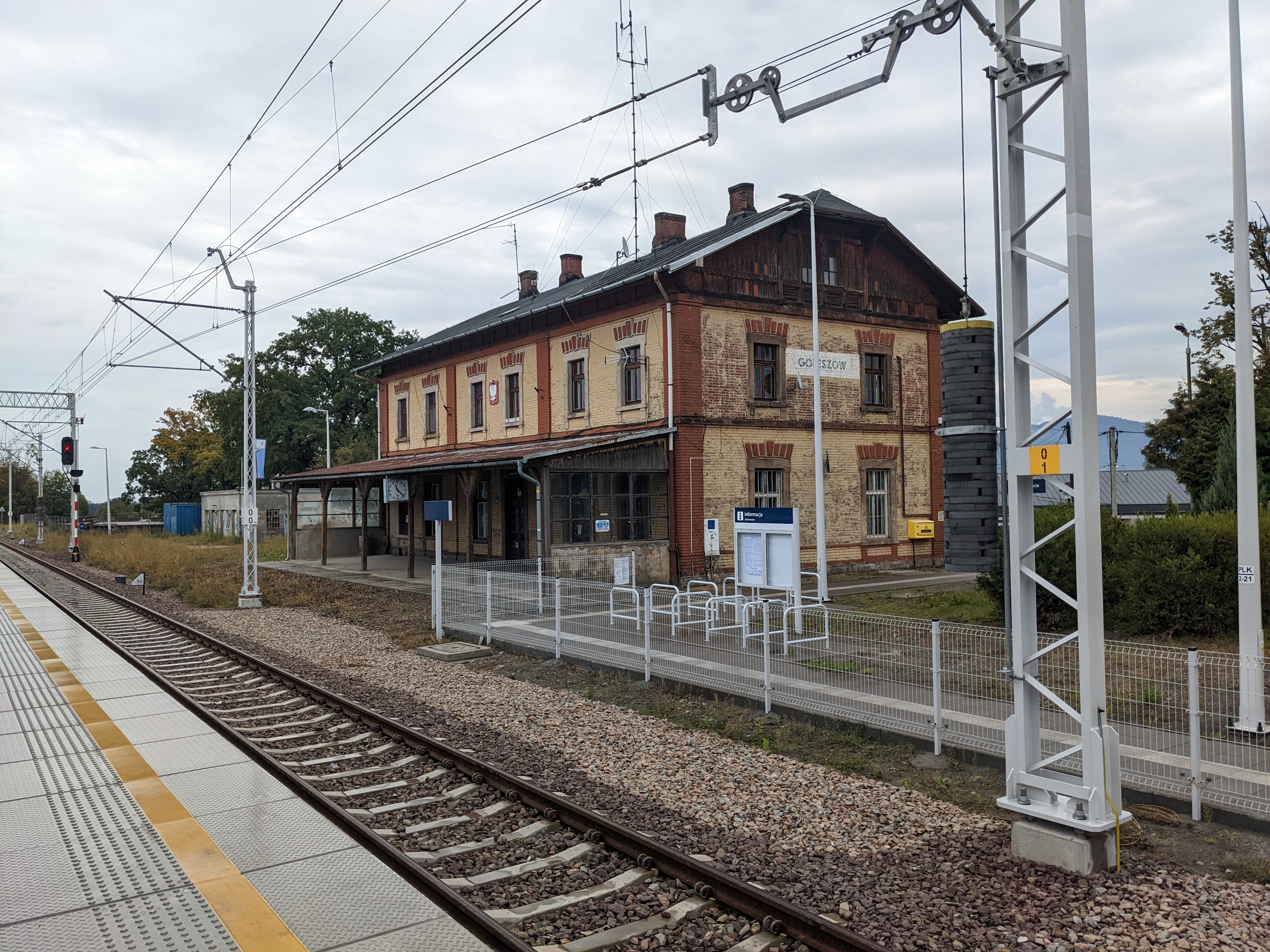

General information
- Location: Goleszów, Silesian; Poland
- Coordinates: 49.7467°N 18.7493°E
- System: Rail Station
- Owner: Polskie Koleje Państwowe S.A.
- Operator: Silesian Railways

History
- Opened: 1st June 1888

Services
Preceding station	KŚ	Following station
Skoczów Bładnice towards Katowice	S6	Ustroń towards Wisła Głębce
Skoczów Bładnice towards Skoczów	S62	Goleszów Górny towards Cieszyn
Skoczów Bładnice towards Gliwice	S76	Ustroń towards Wisła Głębce
Location

Goleszów is one of two railway stations in Goleszów, Poland, the other is Goleszów Górny railway station. The station is located at the junction of the railway lines 190 and 191 near the village of Kozakowice Górne.
