= Dzięgielów =

- Village
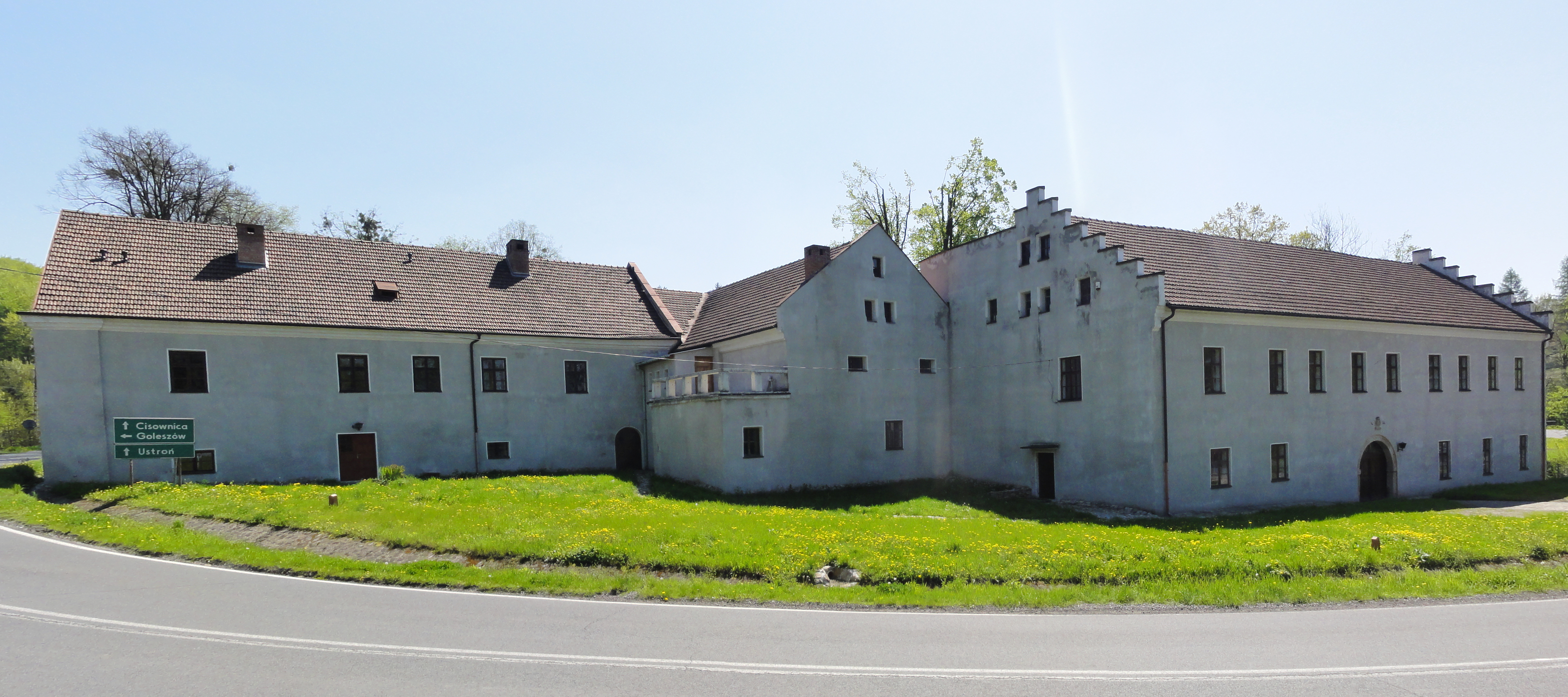
- Château in Dzięgielów

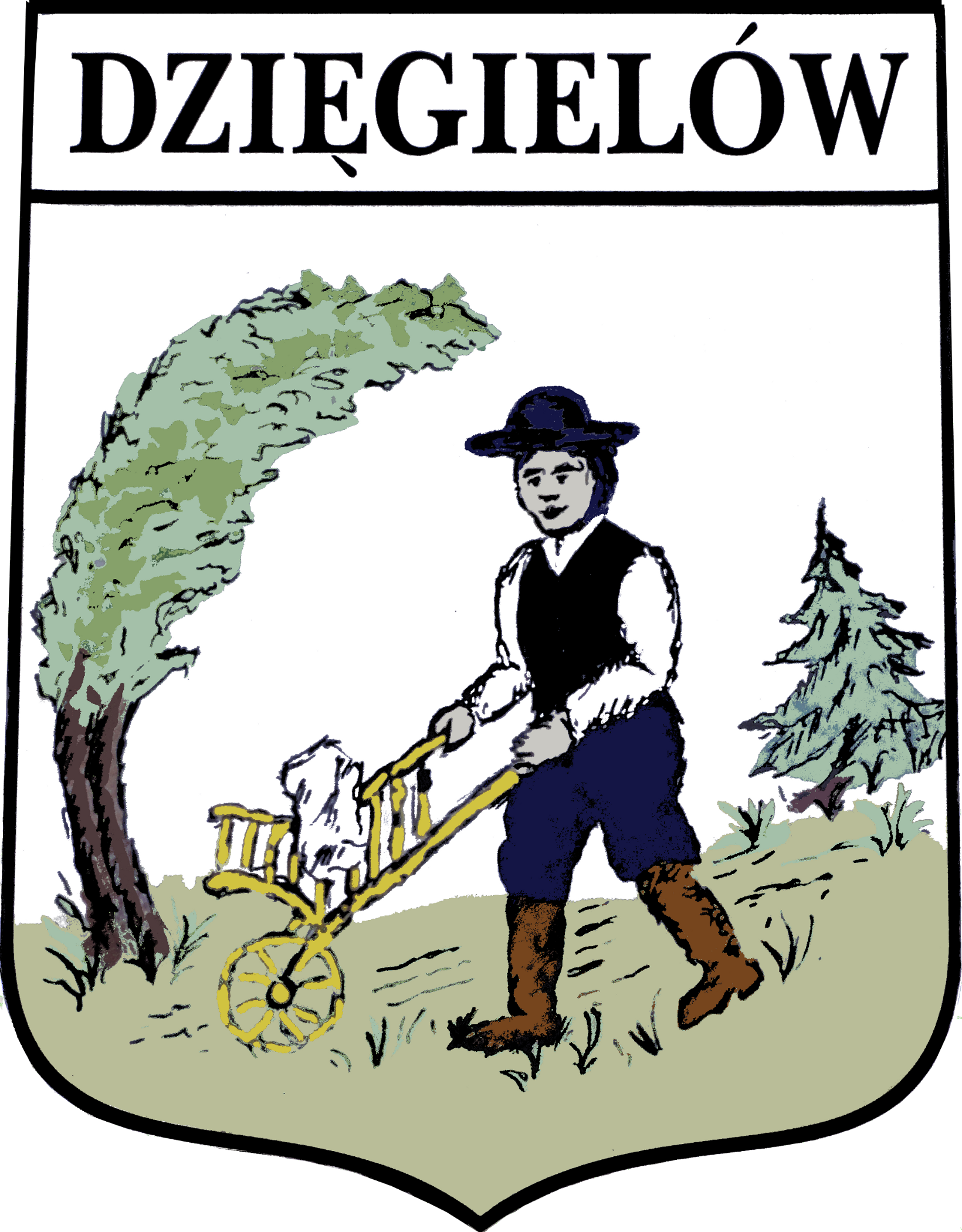
- Coat of arms

- Location within Poland
- Coordinates: 49°43′19.89″N 18°42′12.9″E
- Country: Poland
- Voivodeship: Silesian
- County: Cieszyn
- Gmina: Goleszów
- First mentioned: 1305

Government
  - Mayor: Zbigniew Krzemień

Area
  - Total: 8.31 km^{2} (3.21 sq mi)

Population (2014)
  - Total: 1,364
  - Density: 164/km^{2} (425/sq mi)
- Time zone: UTC+1 (CET)
  - Summer (DST): UTC+2 (CEST)
- Postal code: 43-445
- Car plates: SCI
- Website: Official website

Dzięgielów is a village in Gmina Goleszów, Cieszyn County, Silesian Voivodeship, southern Poland, near the border with the Czech Republic. It lies in the Silesian Foothills and in the historical region of Cieszyn Silesia.

Dzięgielów is one of the most Protestant municipalities of the region. Centre for mission and evangelization of the Evangelical-Augsburg Church is located here. Every year evangelization week occurs on the football field.

== History ==
The village was first mentioned in a Latin document of Diocese of Wrocław called Liber fundationis episcopatus Vratislaviensis from around 1305 as item in Zengilow. It meant that the village was in the process of location (the size of land to pay a tithe from was not yet precised). The creation of the village was a part of a larger settlement campaign taking place in the late 13th century on the territory of what will be later known as Upper Silesia.

Politically the village belonged initially to the Duchy of Teschen, formed in 1290 in the process of feudal fragmentation of Poland and was ruled by a local branch of Piast dynasty. In 1327 the duchy became a fee of the Kingdom of Bohemia, which after 1526 became part of the Habsburg monarchy.

After Revolutions of 1848 in the Austrian Empire a modern municipal division was introduced in the re-established Austrian Silesia. The village as a municipality was subscribed to the political and legal district of Cieszyn. According to the censuses conducted in 1880, 1890, 1900 and 1910 the population of the municipality grew from 501 in 1880 to 506 in 1910 with a majority being native Polish-speakers (between 97.4% and 99.2%) accompanied by a German-speaking people (at most 12 or 2.6% 1890) and Czech-speaking (at most 5 or 1% in 1900). In terms of religion in 1910 majority were Protestants (71.7%), followed by Roman Catholics (28.3%). The village was also traditionally inhabited by Cieszyn Vlachs, speaking Cieszyn Silesian dialect.

After World War I, fall of Austria-Hungary, Polish–Czechoslovak War and the division of Cieszyn Silesia in 1920, it became a part of Poland. It was then annexed by Nazi Germany at the beginning of World War II. After the war it was restored to Poland.

== People ==
- Andrzej Hławiczka, educator and musicologist, was born here
- Karol Kulisz, Protestant pastor and activist, was born here

== Landmarks ==
There is a 15th-century château in the village. Until 1444 it was owned by the noble family Pelhrzim of Trankowice (von Pelchrzim).
