= Kozakowice =

- Village
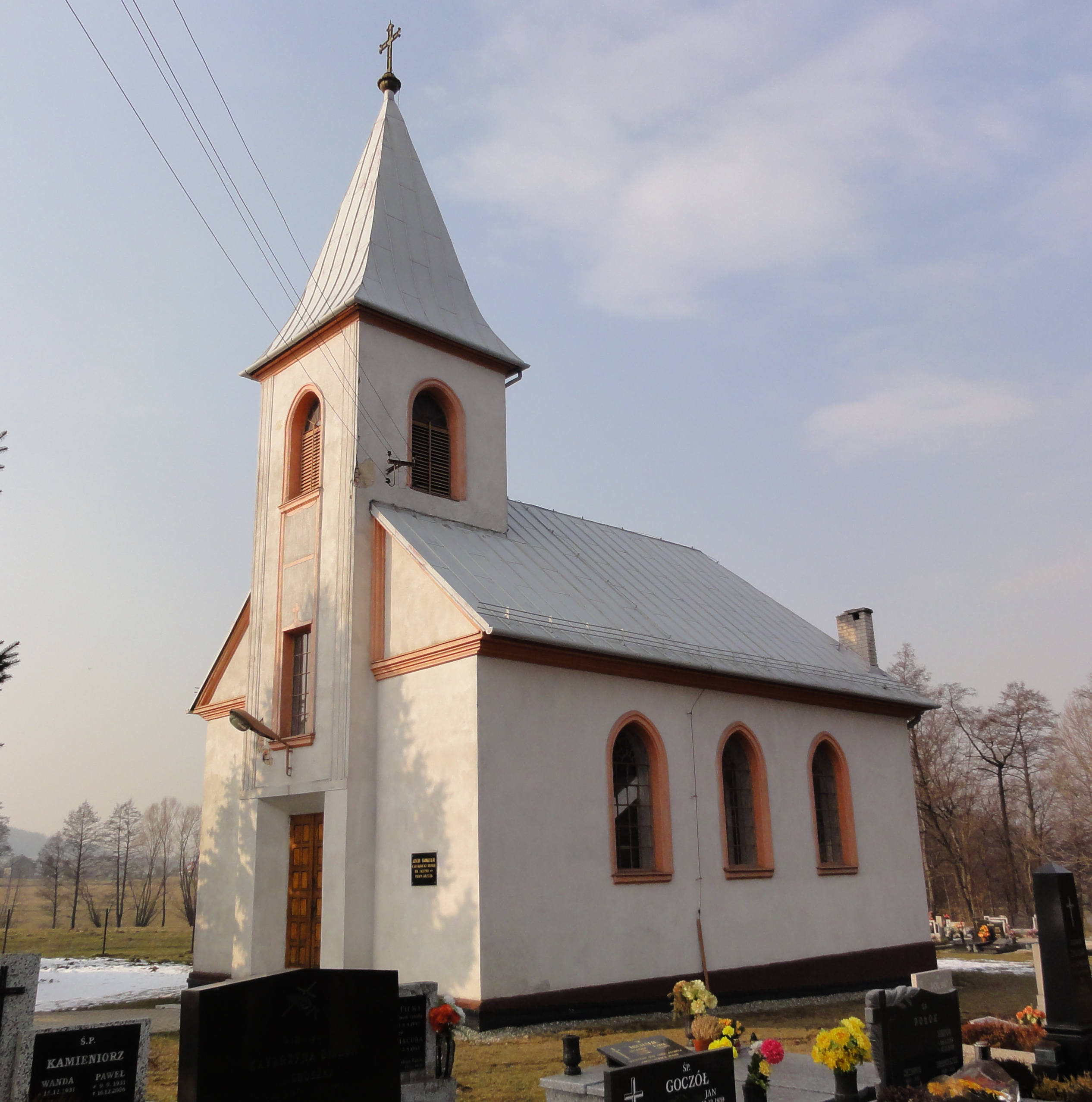
- Lutheran church

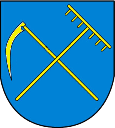
- Coat of arms

- Location within Poland
- Coordinates: 49°44′55.44″N 18°46′2.31″E
- Country: Poland
- Voivodeship: Silesian
- County: Cieszyn
- Gmina: Goleszów
- First mentioned: 1305

Government
  - Mayor: Krzysztof Kohut

Area
  - Total: 3.94 km^{2} (1.52 sq mi)

Population (2014)
  - Total: 702
  - Density: 178/km^{2} (461/sq mi)
- Time zone: UTC+1 (CET)
  - Summer (DST): UTC+2 (CEST)
- Postal code: 43-440
- Car plates: SCI

Kozakowice is a village in Gmina Goleszów, Cieszyn County, Silesian Voivodeship, southern Poland, close to the border with the Czech Republic. It lies in the Silesian Foothills and in the historical region of Cieszyn Silesia. Traditionally as well as currently they form two sołectwos: Kozakowice Dolne and Kozakowice Górne.

== History ==
The village was first mentioned in a Latin document of Diocese of Wrocław called Liber fundationis episcopatus Vratislaviensis from around 1305 as item in Goschegowitz debent esse XIII mansi. It meant that the village was supposed to pay a tithe from 13 greater lans. The creation of the village was a part of a larger settlement campaign taking place in the late 13th century on the territory of what will be later known as Upper Silesia.

Politically the village belonged initially to the Duchy of Teschen, formed in 1290 in the process of feudal fragmentation of Poland and was ruled by a local branch of Piast dynasty. In 1327 the duchy became a fee of the Kingdom of Bohemia, which after 1526 became part of the Habsburg monarchy.

In the early 18th century they were subdivided into two separate villages: Kozakowice Małe (Klein Kozakowice, later Kozakowice Dolne) and Kozakowice Wielkie (Gros Kozakowice, later Kozakowice Górne).

After Revolutions of 1848 in the Austrian Empire a modern municipal division was introduced in the re-established Austrian Silesia. Kozakowice as two separate municipalities were subscribed to the political district of Bielsko and the legal district of Skoczów. According to the censuses conducted in 1880, 1890, 1900 and 1910 the population Kozakowice Dolne grew from 217 in 1880 to 277 in 1910 and of Kozakowice Górne from 233 in 1880 to 276 in 1910. In both villages a majority of the inhabitants were native Polish-speakers (99.1%-100% in Kozakowice Dolne and 99.3%-100% in Kozakowice Górne; not more than 2 people speaking a different language), in terms of religion the majority were Protestants (in 1910 90.6 in Kozakowice Dolne and 82.6% in Kozakowice Górne), followed by Roman Catholics (in 1910 9.4% in Kozakowice Dolne and 17.4% in Kozakowice Górne). The villages were also traditionally inhabited by Cieszyn Vlachs, speaking Cieszyn Silesian dialect.

After World War I, fall of Austria-Hungary, Polish–Czechoslovak War and the division of Cieszyn Silesia in 1920, they became a part of Poland. They were then annexed by Nazi Germany at the beginning of World War II. After the war they were restored to Poland.

== People ==
Andrzej Cinciała, Polish lawyer and activist was born here.
