= Kisielów, Silesian Voivodeship =

Kisielów
- Village
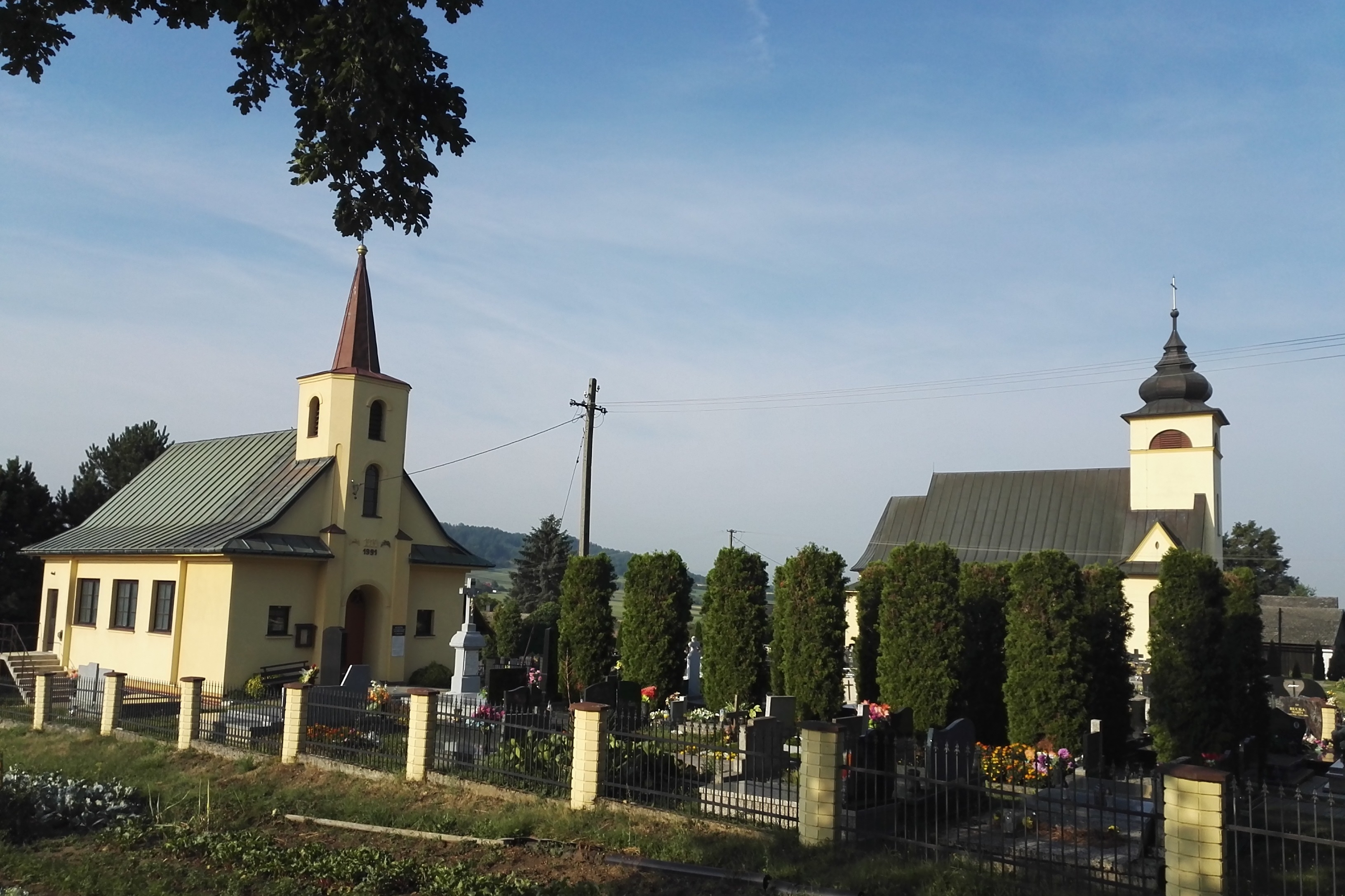
- Lutheran (left) and Catholic (right) churches with respective cemeteries

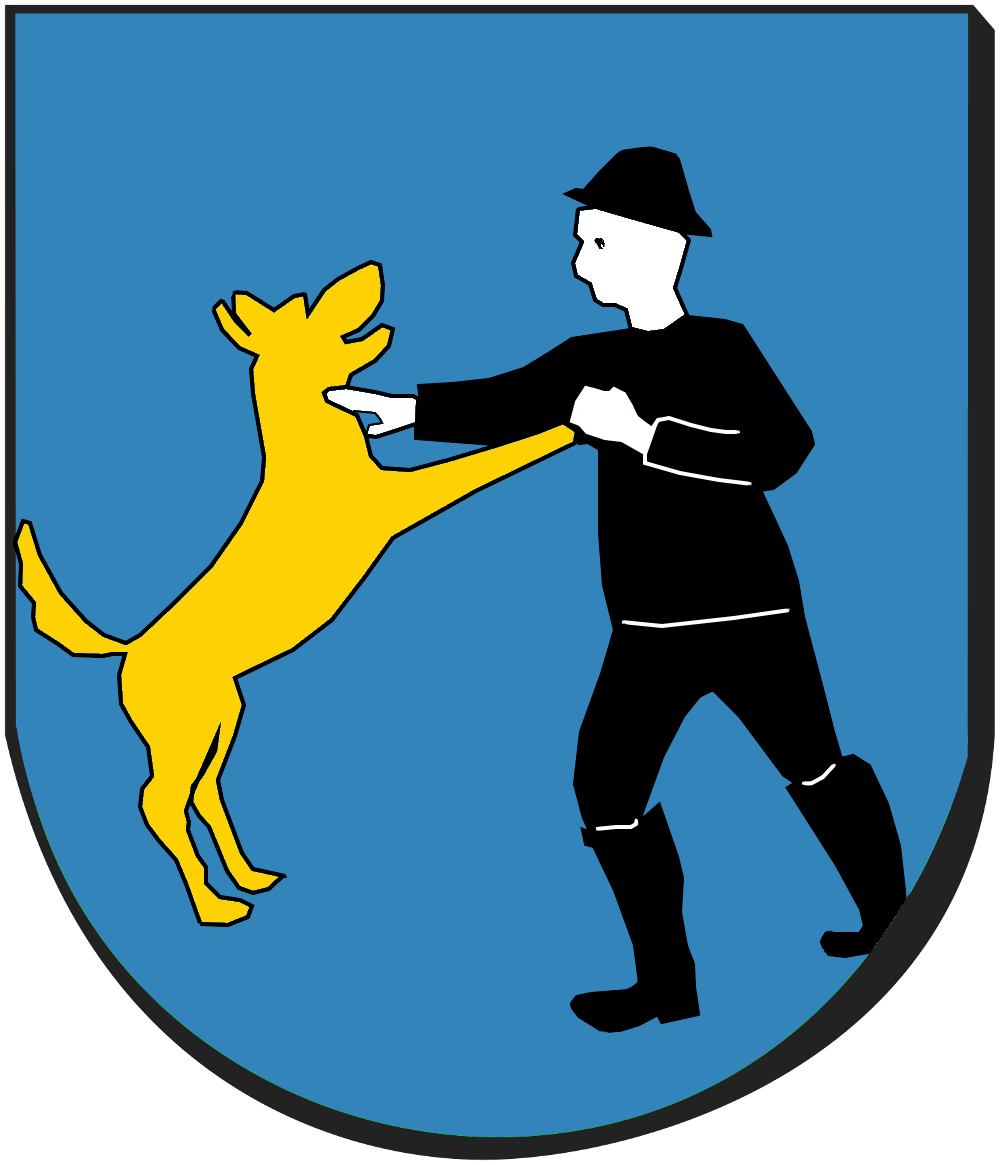
- Coat of arms

- Location within Poland
- Coordinates: 49°46′15.79″N 18°45′21.36″E
- Country: Poland
- Voivodeship: Silesian
- County: Cieszyn
- Gmina: Goleszów

Government
  - Mayor: Karol Szostok

Area
  - Total: 3.37 km^{2} (1.30 sq mi)

Population (2014)
  - Total: 698
  - Density: 207/km^{2} (536/sq mi)
- Time zone: UTC+1 (CET)
  - Summer (DST): UTC+2 (CEST)
- Postal code: 43–440
- Car plates: SCI

Kisielów is a village in Gmina Goleszów, Cieszyn County, Silesian Voivodeship, southern Poland, close to the border with the Czech Republic. It lies in the historical region of Cieszyn Silesia, in the Silesian Foothills.

The name of the village is possessive in origin derived from personal name Kisiel.

== History ==
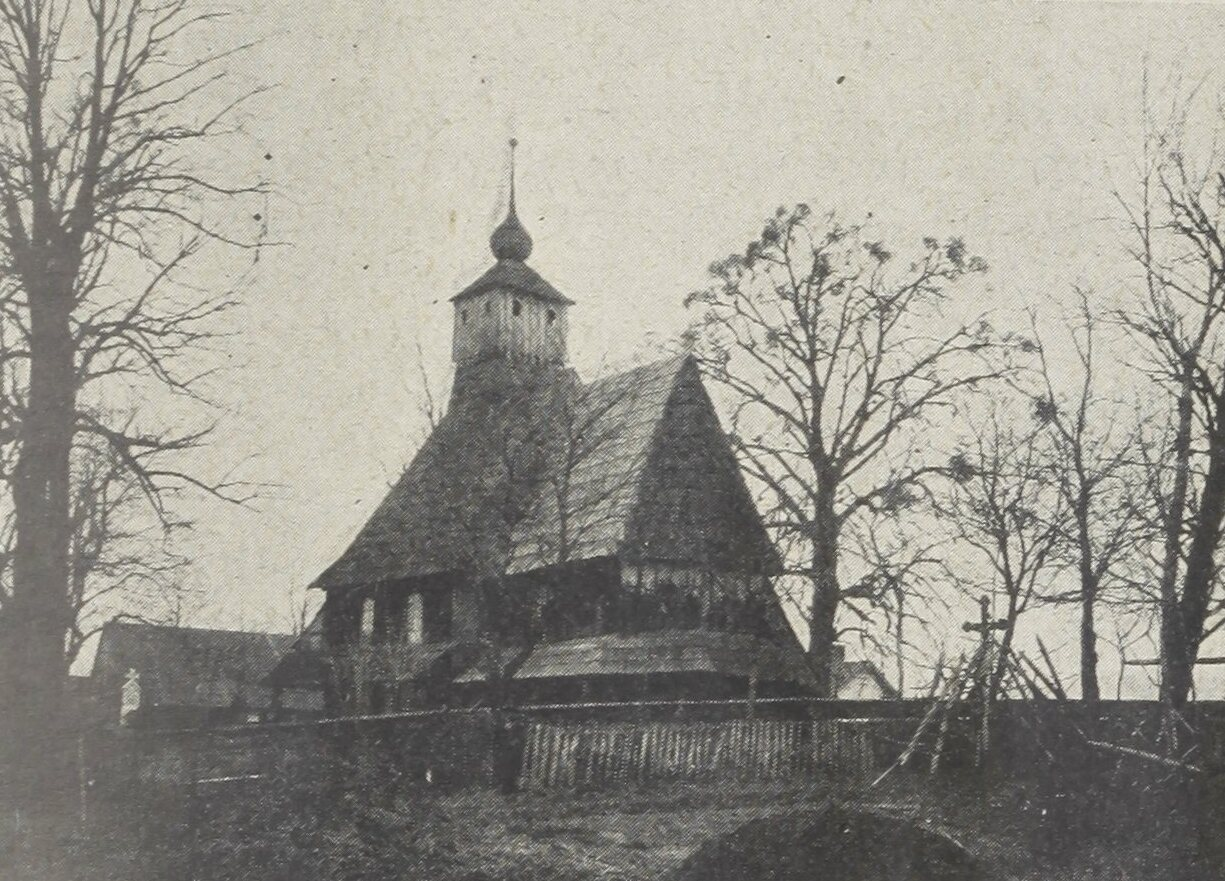
Church in Kisielów, before 1932

Archaeological traces of the first farmers in the area from Lengyel culture (4th millennia BC) have been found in the village.

The village was first mentioned in the letter issued by Wenceslaus I, Duke of Cieszyn on 12 March 1434 in which he bestowed a place called Lochni/Locheny (Łączka?) adjacent to an older village Kiesselaw (Kisielów) upon Ticzko von Logau. Politically it belonged to the Duchy of Teschen, since 1327 a fee of the Kingdom of Bohemia, which after 1526 became part of the Habsburg monarchy.

The village became a seat of a Catholic parish, mentioned in the register of Peter's Pence payment from 1447 among 50 parishes of Teschen deanery as Kyselaw.

Since 1704 it belonged to Cselesta von Cselestin family. Together with Iłownica it was bought from Karl Freyherrn von Celesta by Teschener Kammer in 1792 for 120,000 florins.

After Revolutions of 1848 in the Austrian Empire a modern municipal division was introduced in the re-established Austrian Silesia. The village as a municipality was subscribed to the political district of Bielitz (Bielsko) and the legal district of Skotschau (Skoczów). According to the censuses conducted in 1880, 1890, 1900 and 1910 the population of the municipality grew from 289 in 1880 to 356 in 1910, with a majority of the inhabitants being native Polish-speakers (98.6%–100%) and a few people were Czech-speaking (most 5 or 1.4% in 1910), in terms of religion the majority were Roman Catholics (70.8% in 1910), followed by Protestants (29.2% in 1910). The village was also traditionally inhabited by Cieszyn Vlachs, speaking Cieszyn Silesian dialect.

After World War I, fall of Austria-Hungary, Polish–Czechoslovak War and the division of Cieszyn Silesia in 1920, it became a part of Poland. It was then annexed by Nazi Germany at the beginning of World War II. After the war it was restored to Poland.
