= Iłownica, Silesian Voivodeship =

Iłownica
- Village
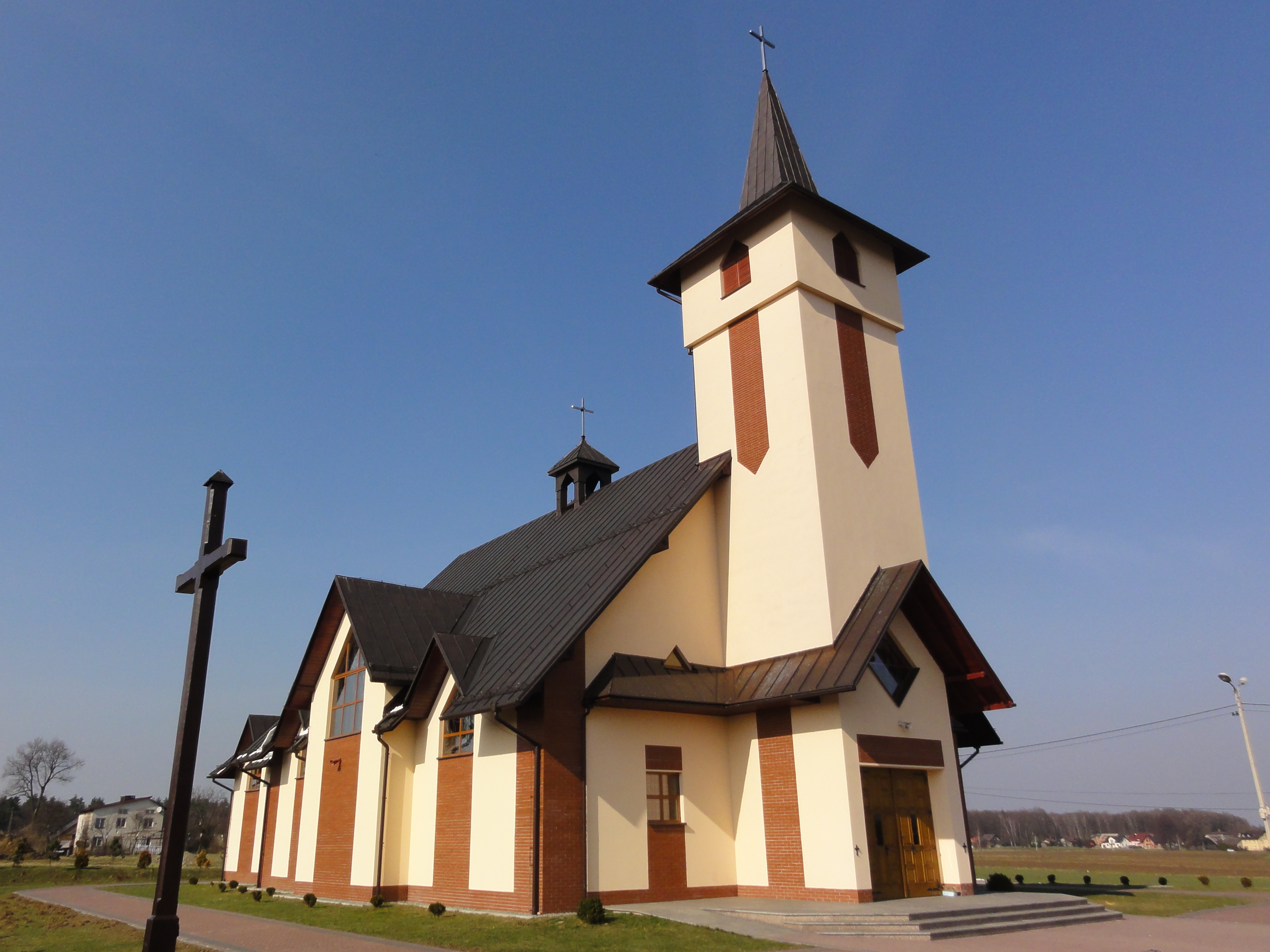
- Church of Saint John Paul II in Iłownica

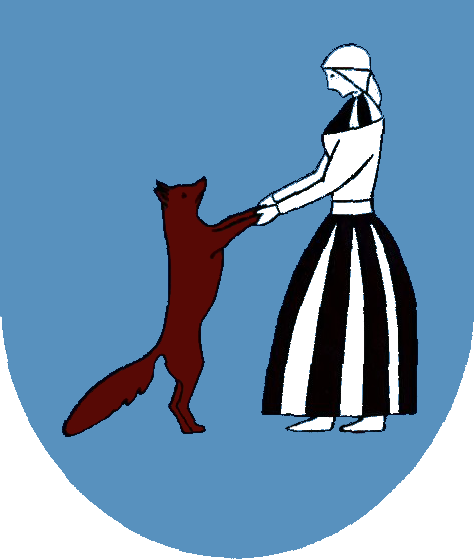
- Coat of arms

- Location within Poland
- Coordinates: 49°52′13.44″N 18°51′25.45″E
- Country: Poland
- Voivodeship: Silesian
- County: Bielsko
- Gmina: Jasienica
- First mentioned: 1305

Government
  - Mayor: Czesław Szkorupa

Area
  - Total: 7.775 km^{2} (3.002 sq mi)

Population (2016)
  - Total: 1,018
  - Density: 130.9/km^{2} (339.1/sq mi)
- Time zone: UTC+1 (CET)
  - Summer (DST): UTC+2 (CEST)
- Postal code: 43-394
- Car plates: SBI

Iłownica [iwɔvˈnit͡sa] is a village in Gmina Jasienica, Bielsko County, Silesian Voivodeship, southern Poland. It lies on the Iłownica River, a tributary of the Vistula, in the Upper Vistula Valley of Oświęcim Basin, in the historical region of Cieszyn Silesia. The name of both the river and the village is derived from loam (Polish: ił, adjective: iłowy).

== History ==
The village was first mentioned in a Latin document of the Diocese of Wrocław called Liber fundationis episcopatus Vratislaviensis from around 1305 as item in Gylownita. It meant that the village was in the process of location (the size of land one which a tithe must be paid was not yet precisely established). The creation of the village was a part of a larger settlement campaign taking place in the late 13th century on the territory of what would be later known as Upper Silesia.

Politically the village belonged initially to the Duchy of Teschen, formed in 1290 in the process of feudal fragmentation of Poland and was ruled by a local branch of the Piast dynasty. In 1327 the duchy became a fee of the Kingdom of Bohemia, which after 1526 became part of the Habsburg monarchy.

The village with Kisielów was bought from Karl Freyherrn von Celesta by Teschener Kammer in 1792 for 120,000 florins.

After the revolutions of 1848 in the Austrian Empire a modern municipal division was introduced in the re-established Austrian Silesia. The village as a municipality became part of the political district of Bielitz (Bielsko) and the legal district of Schwarzwasser (Strumień). According to the censuses conducted in 1880, 1890, 1900 and 1910 the population of the municipality grew from 707 in 1880 to 744 in 1910, with a majority being native Polish-speakers (99.1%-99.9%) accompanied by a few German-speaking people (at most 7, or 0.9%, in 1910). In terms of religion in 1910 majority were Roman Catholics (97%), followed by Protestants (22 or 3%). The village was also traditionally inhabited by Cieszyn Vlachs, speaking the Cieszyn Silesian dialect.

After World War I, the fall of Austria-Hungary, the Polish–Czechoslovak War and the division of Cieszyn Silesia in 1920, the village became a part of Poland. It was then annexed by Nazi Germany at the beginning of World War II. After the war it was restored to Poland.

In 2005-2011 a church dedicated to John Paul II was built in the village, as a filial church of Rudzica.
