= Puńców =

- Village
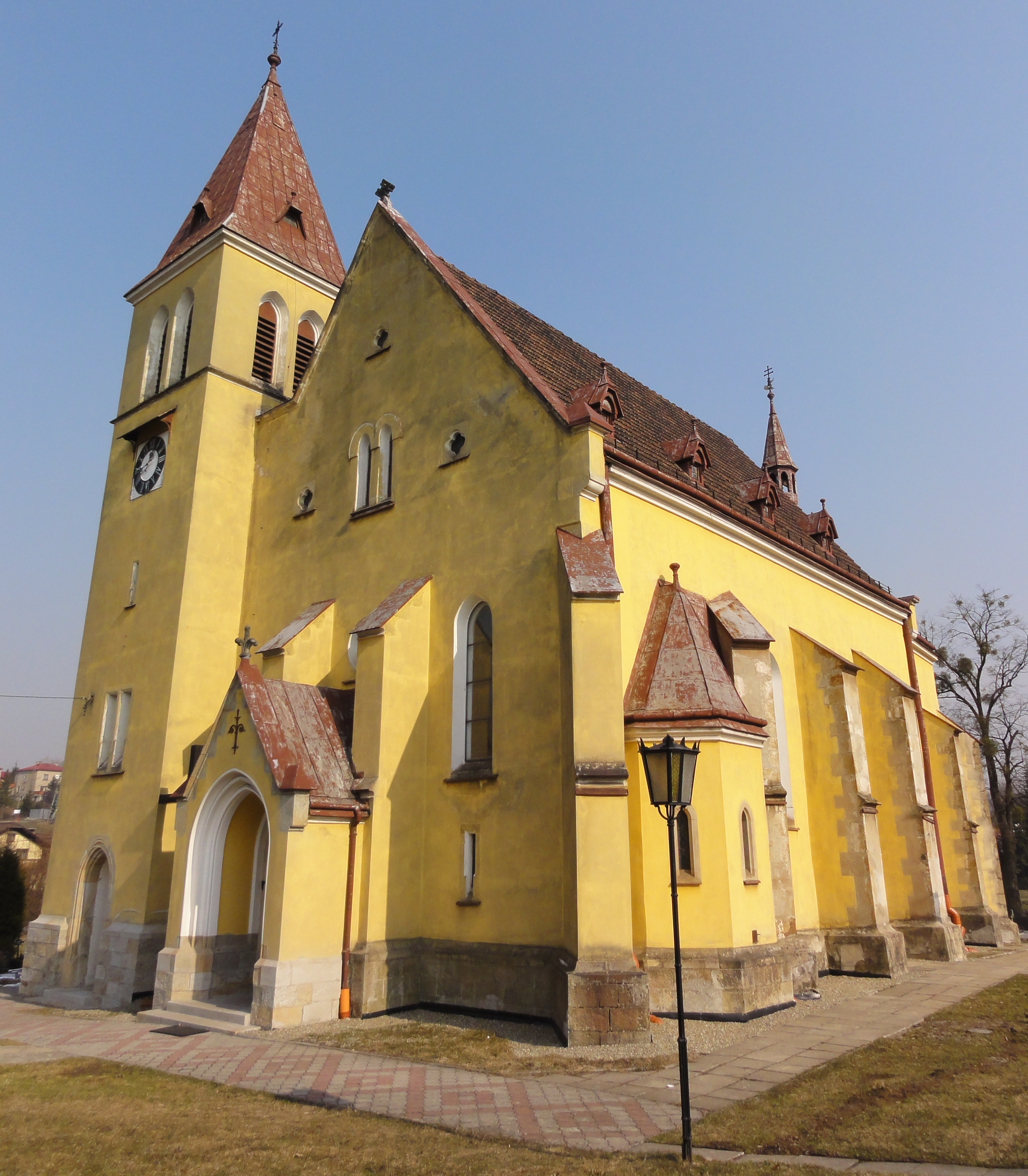
- Saint George church

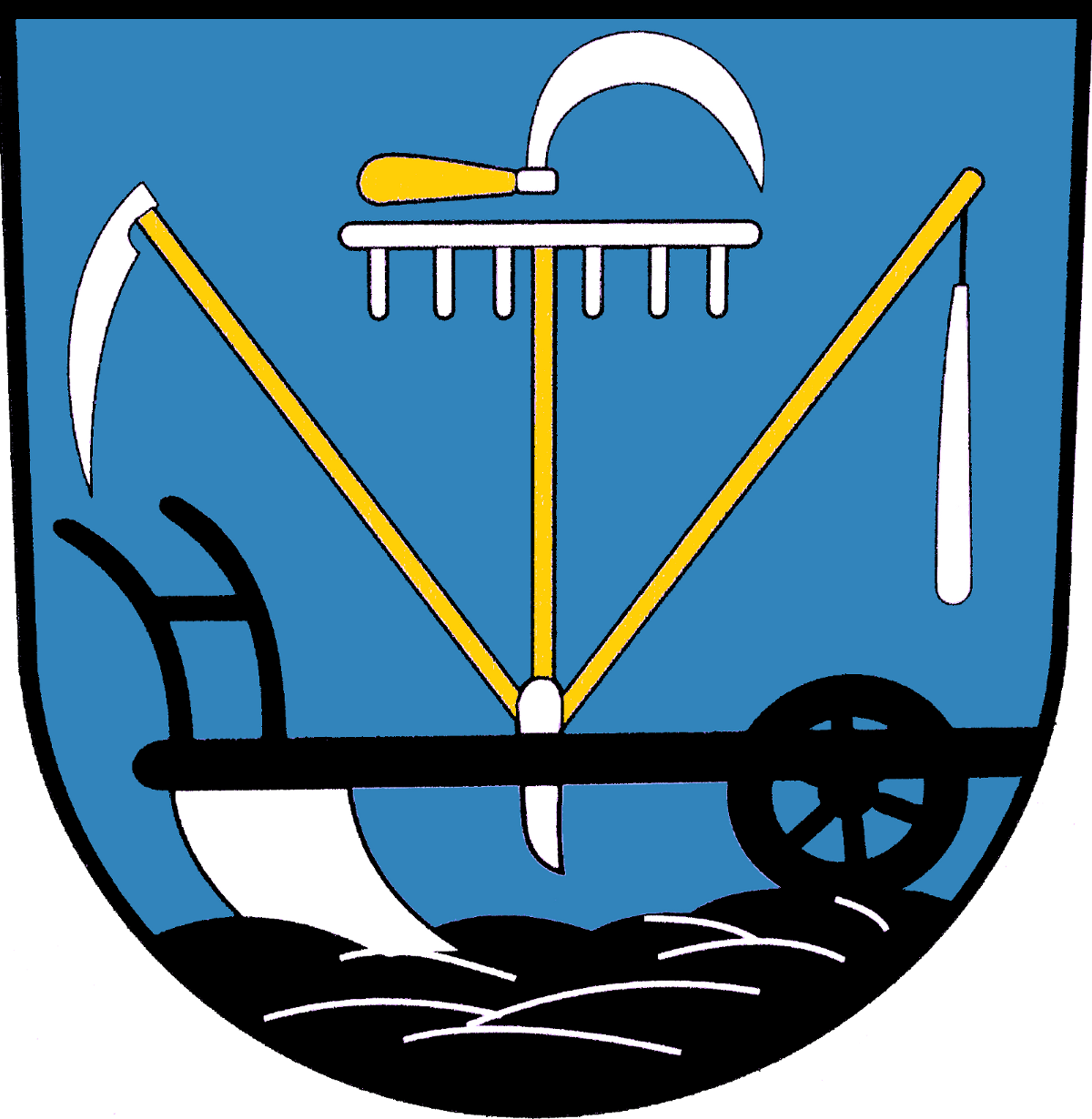
- Coat of arms

- Location within Poland
- Coordinates: 49°43′6.3″N 18°39′44.85″E
- Country: Poland
- Voivodeship: Silesian
- County: Cieszyn
- Gmina: Goleszów
- First mentioned: 1223

Government
  - Mayor: Andrzej Ernst

Area
  - Total: 10.21 km^{2} (3.94 sq mi)

Population (2014)
  - Total: 1,615
  - Density: 158.2/km^{2} (409.7/sq mi)
- Time zone: UTC+1 (CET)
  - Summer (DST): UTC+2 (CEST)
- Postal code: 43-400
- Car plates: SCI

Puńców is a village in Gmina Goleszów, Cieszyn County, Silesian Voivodeship, Poland, on the border with the Czech Republic. The village lies in the Silesian Foothills and in the historical region of Cieszyn Silesia.

The name is probably of possessive origin derived from personal name Puńc (such a name was probably derived from Middle High German word punze, ponze, later a nickname?).

== History ==
It was first mentioned in a document of Bishop of Wrocław issued on 23 May 1223 for Norbertine Sisters in Rybnik among villages paying them a tithe, as Punzo. In the same document another village of Radowice (Radouiza) was mentioned, which was later absorbed by Puńców. In 1228 the aforementioned Norbertine Sisters moved from Rybnik to Czarnowąsy the tithe from most of the villages listed in 1223 were taken from them, however Puńców was extraordinarily given to them as a possession. In that year the village was conveyed to a Polish law. The village was again mentioned in the document of Pope Gregory IX issued in 1229 as a village belonging to the Benedictine abbey in Tyniec. Later in unattested circumstances the ownership of the village changed to dukes.

Politically it belonged then to the Duchy of Opole and Racibórz and the Castellany of Cieszyn, which was in 1290 formed in the process of feudal fragmentation of Poland into the Duchy of Teschen, ruled by a local branch of Silesian Piast dynasty. In 1327 the duchy became a fee of the Kingdom of Bohemia, which after 1526 became a part of the Habsburg monarchy.

After Revolutions of 1848 in the Austrian Empire a modern municipal division was introduced in the re-established Austrian Silesia. The village as a municipality was subscribed to the political and legal district of Cieszyn. According to the censuses conducted in 1880, 1890, 1900 and 1910 the population of the municipality grew from 1,009 in 1880 to 1,434 in 1910 with a growing majority being native Polish-speakers (from 98.1% in 1880 to 99.2% in 1910) accompanied by a small German-speaking minority (at most 17 or 3.1% in 1880) and a few Czech-speaking people (at most 8 or 0.7% in 1900). In terms of religion in 1910 the majority were Protestants (56.3%), followed by Roman Catholics (43.7%). The village was also traditionally inhabited by Cieszyn Vlachs, speaking Cieszyn Silesian dialect.

After World War I, fall of Austria-Hungary, Polish–Czechoslovak War and the division of Cieszyn Silesia in 1920, it became a part of Poland. It was then annexed by Nazi Germany at the beginning of World War II. After the war it was restored to Poland.

== Landmarks ==
There is a Saint George Roman Catholic church in the village. It was built in 1518 in the late Gothic style.
