= Paweł Anweiler =

Polish Lutheran bishop (1950–2026)

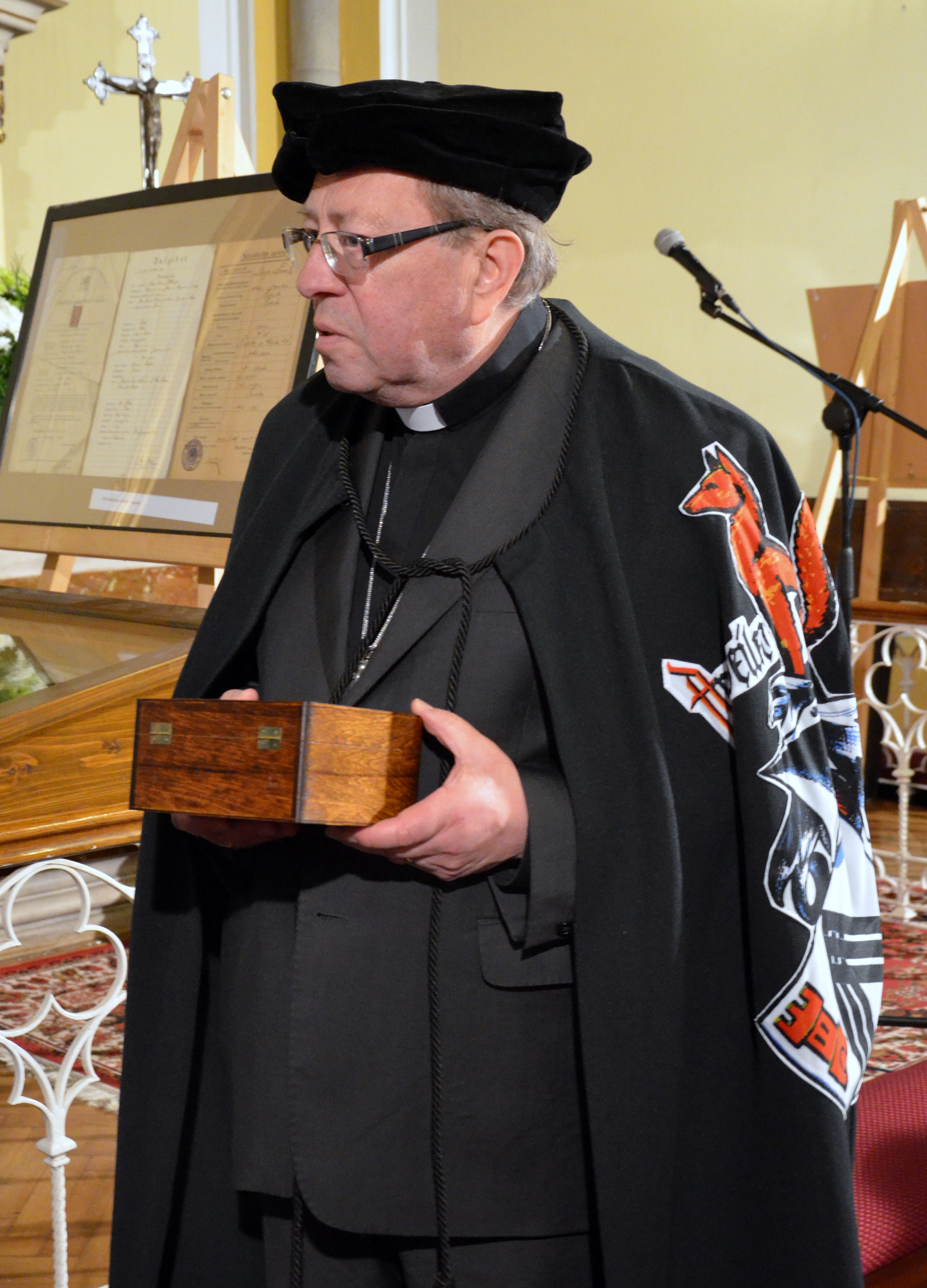
Anweiler in 2016

Paweł Anweiler (16 June 1950 – 9 November 2026) was a Polish Lutheran bishop of the Evangelical-Augsburg Church in Poland from 1992 with a residence in Bielsko-Biała.

From 1974 to 1976, he was a curate in Kalisz and worked from 1976 to 1979 as administrator of the Evangelical Church in Kępno. From 1979 to 1991 he was the cleric in Częstochowa, and then for a year the cleric of Bielsko-Biała. From 1992 to 2016 he was bishop of the Diocese of Cieszyn of the Evangelical-Augsburg Church in Poland.

Anweiler died on 9 November 2026 at the age of 76.

== Sources ==
- Anweiler webpage
