= Bładnice =

- Village
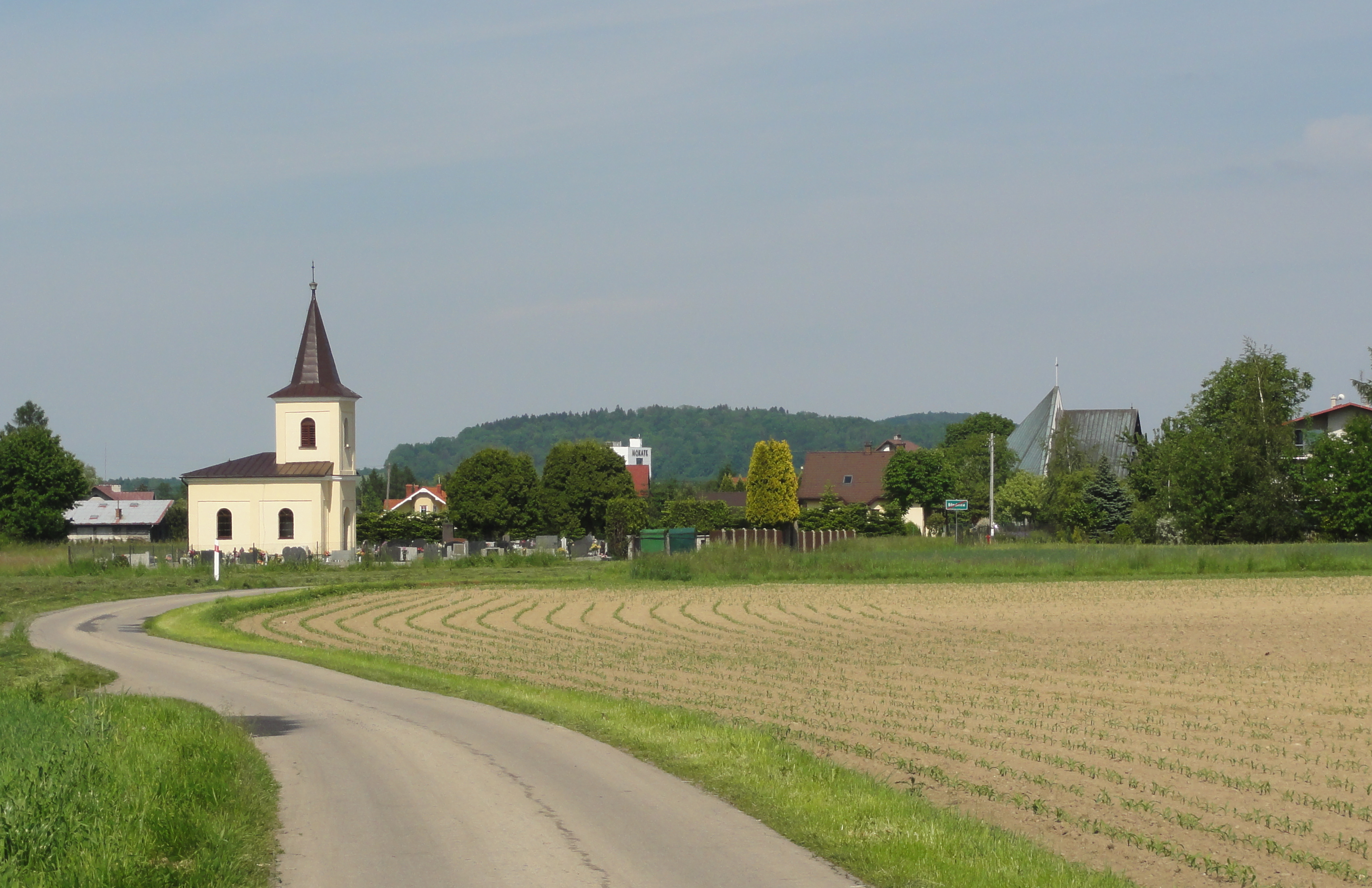
- Lutheran cemetery and church

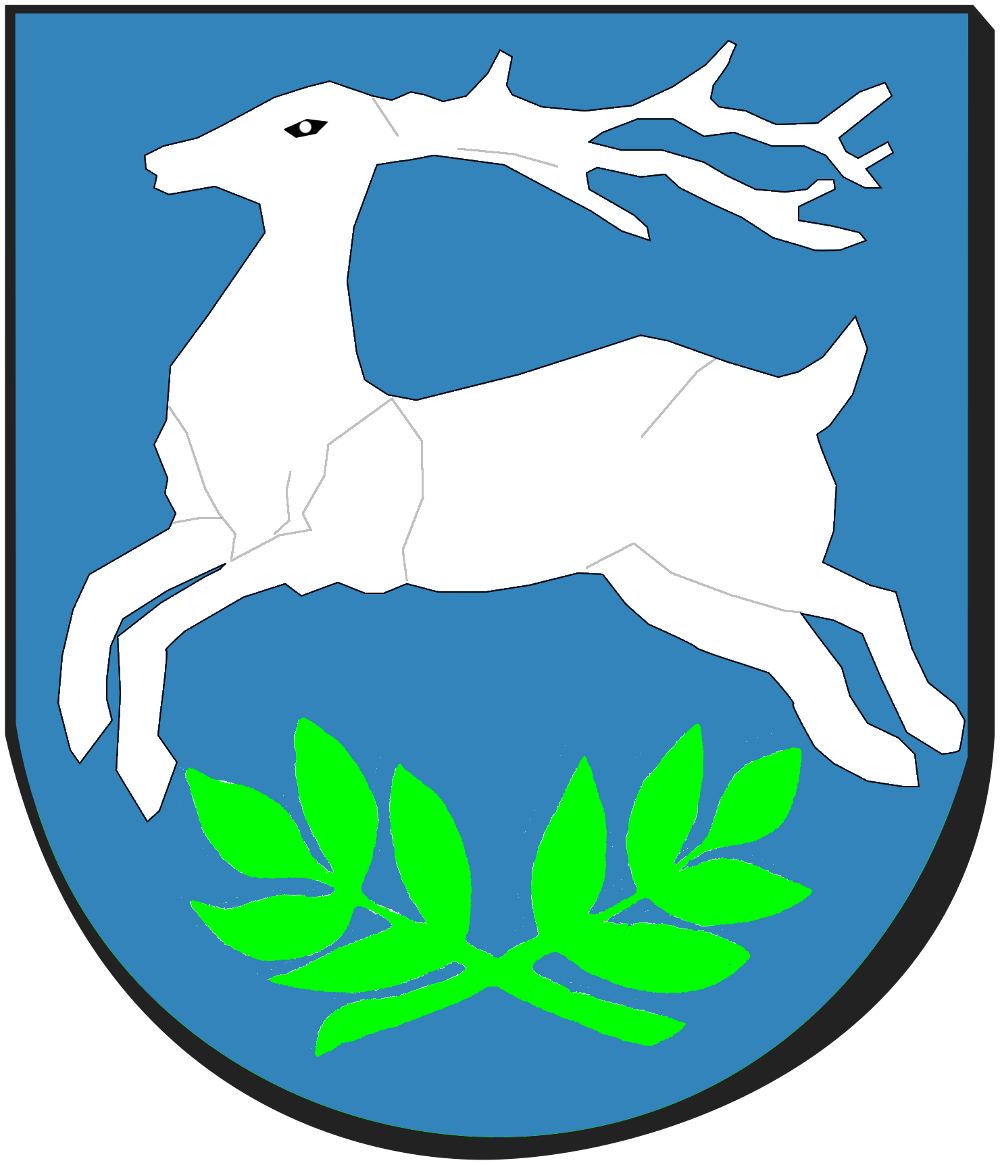
- Coat of arms

- Location within Poland
- Coordinates: 49°46′42.51″N 18°46′45.76″E
- Country: Poland
- Voivodeship: Silesian
- County: Cieszyn
- Gmina: Skoczów
- First mentioned: 1416

Government
  - Mayor: Jadwiga Kozok

Area
  - Total: 2.91 km^{2} (1.12 sq mi)

Population (2016)
  - Total: 859
  - Density: 295/km^{2} (765/sq mi)
- Time zone: UTC+1 (CET)
  - Summer (DST): UTC+2 (CEST)
- Postal code: 43-430
- Car plates: SCI

Bładnice is a village in Gmina Skoczów, Cieszyn County, Silesian Voivodeship, southern Poland. It is located in the Silesian Foothills, on the Bładnica river, left tributary of the Vistula river. It lies in the historical region of Cieszyn Silesia.

== History ==
The village was first mentioned in 1416 in the document of Bolesław of Cieszyn. Politically it belonged then to the Duchy of Teschen, a fee of the Kingdom of Bohemia, which after 1526 became part of the Habsburg monarchy.

The history of the village was strongly twined with the history of Nierodzim where the noble owners of them both resided. Later the distinction between two parts of the village developed: Dolne (lit. Lower) and Górne (Upper). Bładnice Górne were then absorbed by Nierodzim. In the late 19th century they both became part of the Teschener Kammer.

After Revolutions of 1848 in the Austrian Empire a modern municipal division was introduced in the re-established Austrian Silesia. Bładnice Dolne as a municipality was subscribed to the political district of Bielsko and the legal district of Skotschau. According to the censuses conducted in 1880, 1890, 1900 and 1910 the population of the municipality dropped from 211 in 1880 to 204 in 1910, with all of the inhabitants being native Polish-speakers of mostly Protestants faith (143, 70.1% in 1910), followed by Roman Catholics (61, 29.9%). Similarly Bładnice Górne as a cadastral community of Nierodzim in 1910 had 87 inhabitants, all of them Polish-speaking, 57 (65.5%) Protestants and 30 (34.5%) Catholics. The village was also traditionally inhabited by Cieszyn Vlachs, speaking Cieszyn Silesian dialect.

After World War I, the fall of Austria-Hungary, the Polish–Czechoslovak War and the division of Cieszyn Silesia in 1920, it became a part of Poland. It was then annexed by Nazi Germany at the beginning of World War II. After the war it was restored to Poland.

Bładnicy Dolne and Bładnice Górne were administratively joined in 1973.

== Religion ==
A Lutheran church was built here in 1990, as a filial church of Ustroń. In 2000 it became an independent parish of the Diocese of Cieszyn.
