= Nierodzim =

- Osiedle of Ustroń
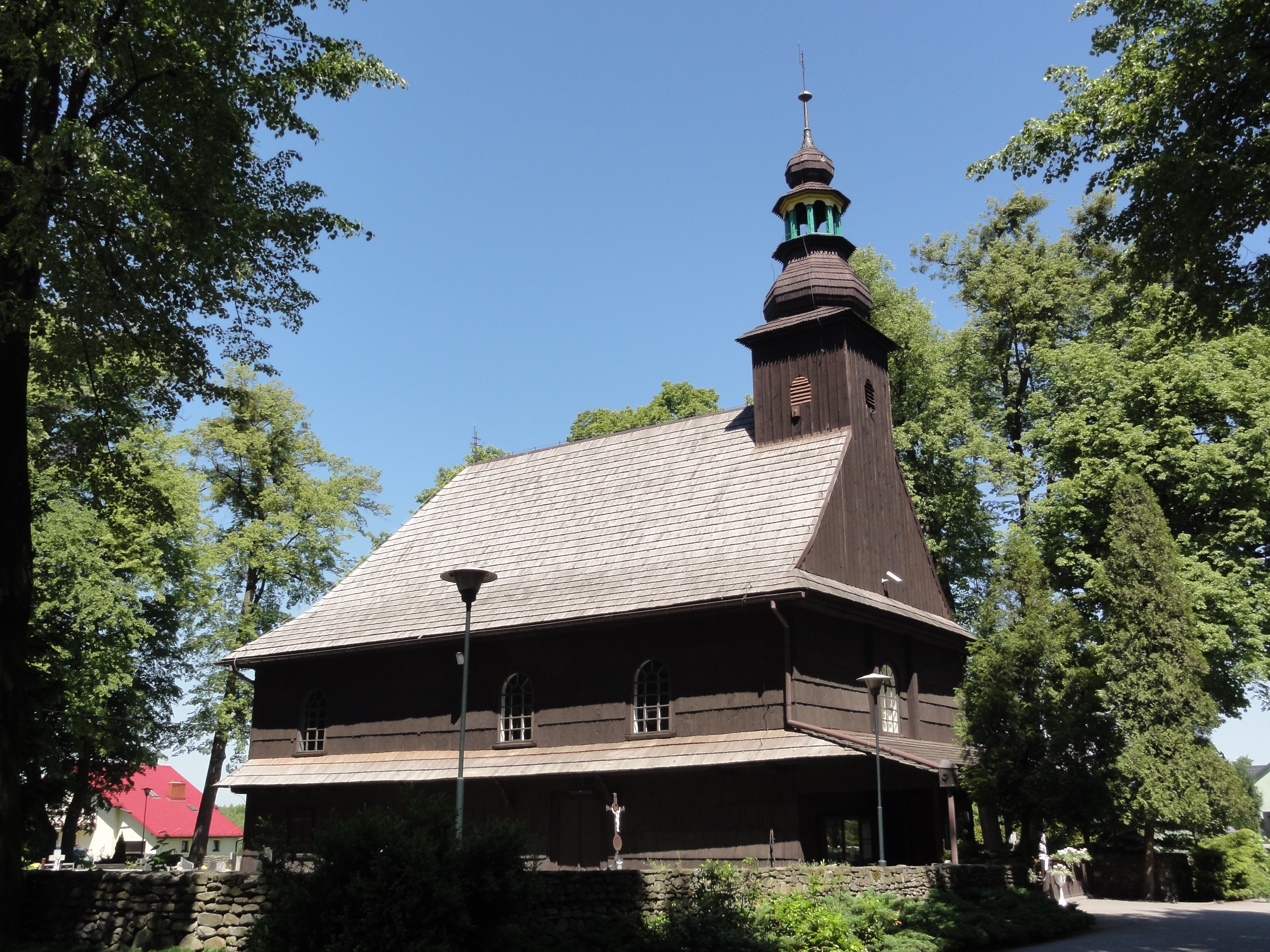
- Saint Anna Church
- Interactive map of Nierodzim
- Coordinates: 49°45′55.2″N 18°48′48″E
- Country: Poland
- Voivodeship: Silesian
- County: Cieszyn
- Time zone: UTC+1 (CET)
  - Summer (DST): UTC+2 (CEST)
- Area code: (+48) 033

Nierodzim is a district (osiedle) of Ustroń, Silesian Voivodeship, Poland. It was a separate municipality, but became administratively a part of Ustroń on January 1, 1973.

== History ==
The village was first mentioned in 1439 as Nerodzim. Politically the village belonged then to the Duchy of Teschen, formed in 1290 in the process of feudal fragmentation of Poland and was ruled by a local branch of Piast dynasty. In 1327 the duchy became a fee of the Kingdom of Bohemia, which after 1526 became part of the Habsburg monarchy.

After the 1540s Protestant Reformation prevailed in the Duchy of Teschen and later local Lutherans built a wooden church. It was taken from them (as one from around fifty buildings) in the region by a special commission and given back to the Roman Catholic Church on 16 April 1654.

After Revolutions of 1848 in the Austrian Empire a modern municipal division was introduced in the re-established Austrian Silesia. The village as a municipality was subscribed to the political district of Bielsko and the legal district of Skoczów. According to the censuses conducted in 1880, 1890, 1900 and 1910 the population of the municipality (together with the cadastral community of Bładnice Górne) grew from 578 in 1880 to 626 in 1910 with a majority being native Polish-speakers (98.4%-99.3%) and a small German-speaking minority (most 10 or 1.6% in 1910), in terms of religion majority were Protestants (57% in 1910), followed by Roman Catholics (42.1% in 1910) and Jews (6 people). The village was also traditionally inhabited by Cieszyn Vlachs, speaking Cieszyn Silesian dialect.

After World War I, fall of Austria-Hungary, Polish–Czechoslovak War and the division of Cieszyn Silesia in 1920, it became a part of Poland. It was then annexed by Nazi Germany at the beginning of World War II. After the war it was restored to Poland.
