= Vendryně =

Vendryně Wędrynia
- Municipality
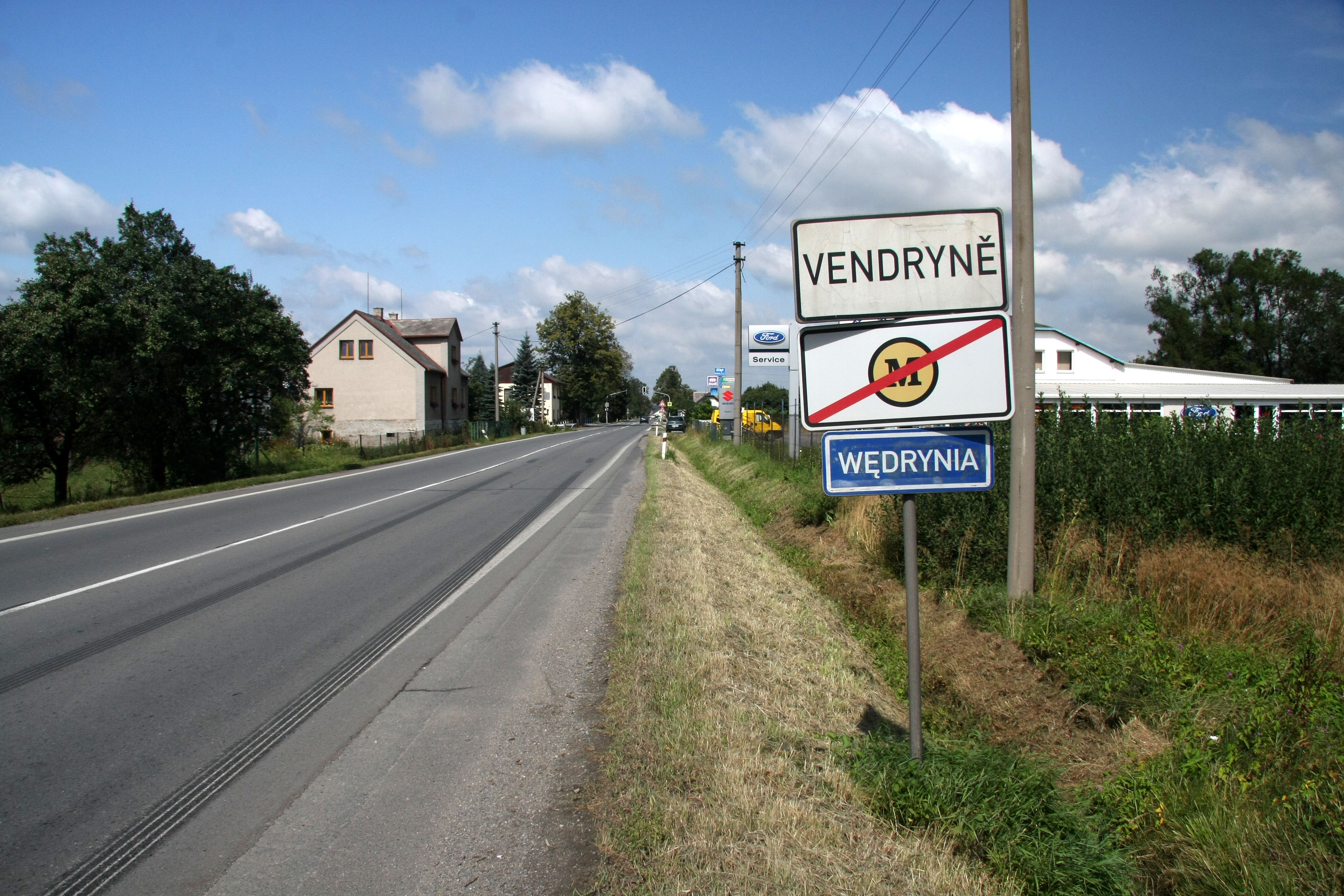
- Entrance to Vendryně

- Flag Coat of arms

- Location in the Czech Republic
- Coordinates: 49°40′0″N 18°42′47″E
- Country: Czech Republic
- Region: Moravian-Silesian
- District: Frýdek-Místek
- First mentioned: 1305

Area
  - Total: 20.95 km^{2} (8.09 sq mi)
- Elevation: 350 m (1,150 ft)

Population (2026-01-01)
  - Total: 4,511
  - Density: 215.3/km^{2} (557.7/sq mi)
- Time zone: UTC+1 (CET)
  - Summer (DST): UTC+2 (CEST)
- Postal codes: 739 94, 739 95
- Website: www.vendryne.cz

Vendryně (Czech pronunciation: [ˈvɛndrɪɲɛ]; Polish: Wędrynia) is a municipality and village in Frýdek-Místek District in the Moravian-Silesian Region of the Czech Republic. It has about 4,500 inhabitants. It lies in the historical region of Cieszyn Silesia on the banks of the Olza River. The municipality has a significant Polish minority.

== Etymology ==
The name of Vendryně is of topographic origins derived from the toponymic base *vądr- tentatively connected with water.

== Geography ==
Vendryně is located about 25 kilometres (16 mi) east of Frýdek-Místek and 33 km (21 mi) southeast of Ostrava. It lies in the historical region of Cieszyn Silesia. It forms a conurbation with neighbouring Třinec, and is separated from Třinec by the river Olza, which flows along the western border of the municipal territory and intersects it at the narrowest point.

Vendryně lies mostly in the Moravian-Silesian Foothills, but its elongated territory also extends into the Silesian Beskids on the north and into the Moravian-Silesian Beskids on the south. The southern part also includes the highest mountain in the municipality, Žďár at 748 m (2,454 ft) above sea level.

== History ==
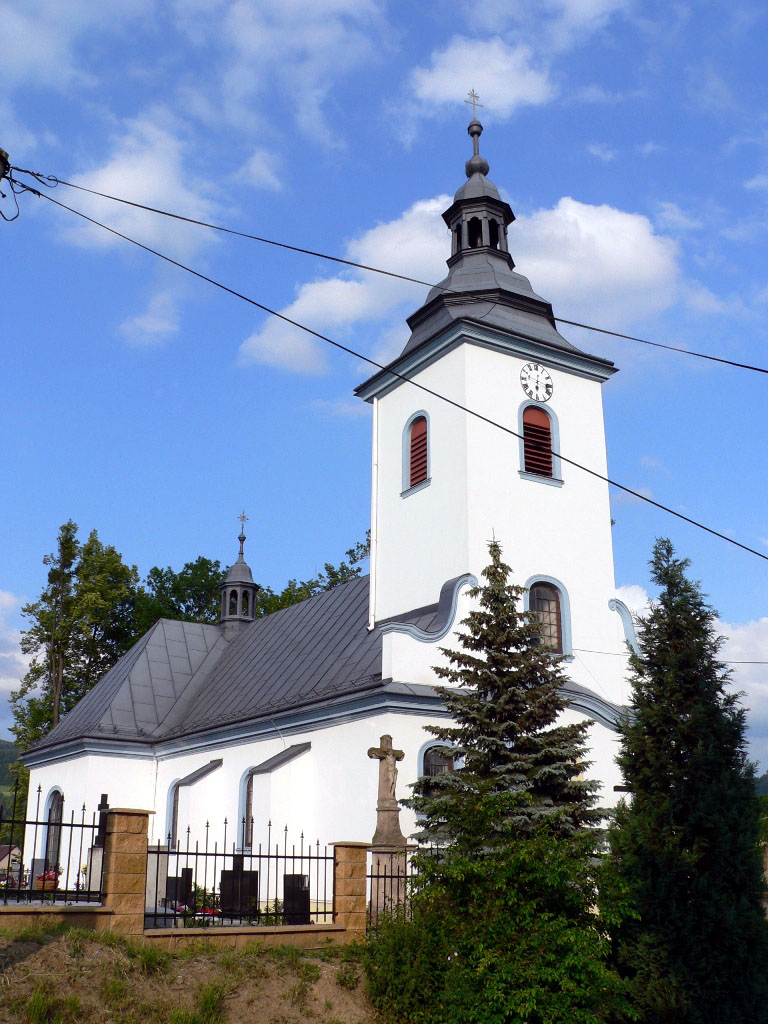
Church of Saint Catherine

The settlement was first mentioned in a Latin document of Diocese of Wrocław called Liber fundationis episcopatus Vratislaviensis from around 1305 as Wandrina. It meant that the village was in the process of location (the size of land to pay a tithe from was not yet precised). The creation of the village was a part of a larger settlement campaign taking place in the late 13th century on the territory of what will be later known as Upper Silesia.

Politically the village belonged initially to the Duchy of Teschen, formed in 1290 in the process of feudal fragmentation of Poland and was ruled by a local branch of Piast dynasty. In 1327 the duchy became a fee of the Kingdom of Bohemia, which after 1526 became part of the Habsburg monarchy.

The village became a seat of a Catholic parish, mentioned in the register of Peter's Pence payment from 1447 among 50 parishes of Teschen deanery as Vandrzina. After 1540s Protestant Reformation prevailed in the Duchy of Teschen and a local Catholic church was taken over by Lutherans. It was taken from them (as one from around fifty buildings in the region) by a special commission and given back to the Roman Catholic Church on 21 March 1654.

In the 19th century an iron ore was mined in the village for the iron works in Ustroń and later the Třinec Iron and Steel Works in Třinec, which caused a rapid development of Vendryně. The mining ended in 1895. Limestone was mined here for the steel works until 1965.

After Revolutions of 1848 in the Austrian Empire a modern municipal division was introduced in the re-established Austrian Silesia. The village as a municipality was subscribed to the political district of Teschen and the legal district of Jablunkau. According to the censuses conducted in 1880–1910 the population of the municipality grew from 1,989 in 1880 to 2,587 in 1910 with a majority being native Polish-speakers (between 97.4% and 98.9%) accompanied by German-speaking (at most 62 or 2.4% in 1910) and Czech-speaking people (at most 6 or 0.2% in 1910). In terms of religion in 1910 the majority were Protestants (69%), followed by Roman Catholics (30.5%) and Jews (16 or 0.5%). The village was also traditionally inhabited by Cieszyn Vlachs, speaking Cieszyn Silesian dialect.

After World War I, fall of Austria-Hungary, Polish–Czechoslovak War and the division of Cieszyn Silesia in 1920, it became a part of Czechoslovakia. Following the Munich Agreement, in October 1938 together with the Trans-Olza region it was annexed by Poland, administratively adjoined to Cieszyn County of Silesian Voivodeship. It was then annexed by Nazi Germany at the beginning of World War II. After the war it was restored to Czechoslovakia.

From 1980 to 1995, Vendryně was a municipal part of the city of Třinec.

== Demographics ==
According to the 2021 Census, Polish minority makes up 23.3% of the population.

Historical population

Year	Pop.	±%
1869	1,733	—
1880	1,989	+14.8%
1890	2,116	+6.4%
1900	2,373	+12.1%
1910	2,587	+9.0%

Year	Pop.	±%
1921	2,775	+7.3%
1930	3,356	+20.9%
1950	3,117	−7.1%
1961	3,375	+8.3%
1970	3,326	−1.5%

Year	Pop.	±%
1980	3,573	+7.4%
1991	3,590	+0.5%
2001	3,842	+7.0%
2011	4,137	+7.7%
2021	4,383	+5.9%

Source: Censuses

== Transport ==
The I/68 road (part of the European route E75), which connects the D48 motorway with the Czech–Slovak border in Mosty u Jablunkova, runs through the municipality.

Vendryně is located on the railway line Ostrava–Mosty u Jablunkova.

== Sights ==
The Church of Saint Catherine was probably established together with the village before 1300. It has a rare bell created between 1420 and 1460.

The lime kilns that were built here in the early 19th century are now protected as a technical monument.

== Notable people ==
- Ewa Farna (born 1993), singer

== Twin towns – sister cities ==
Vendryně is twinned with:

- Goleszów, Poland
