= Goleszów =

- Village
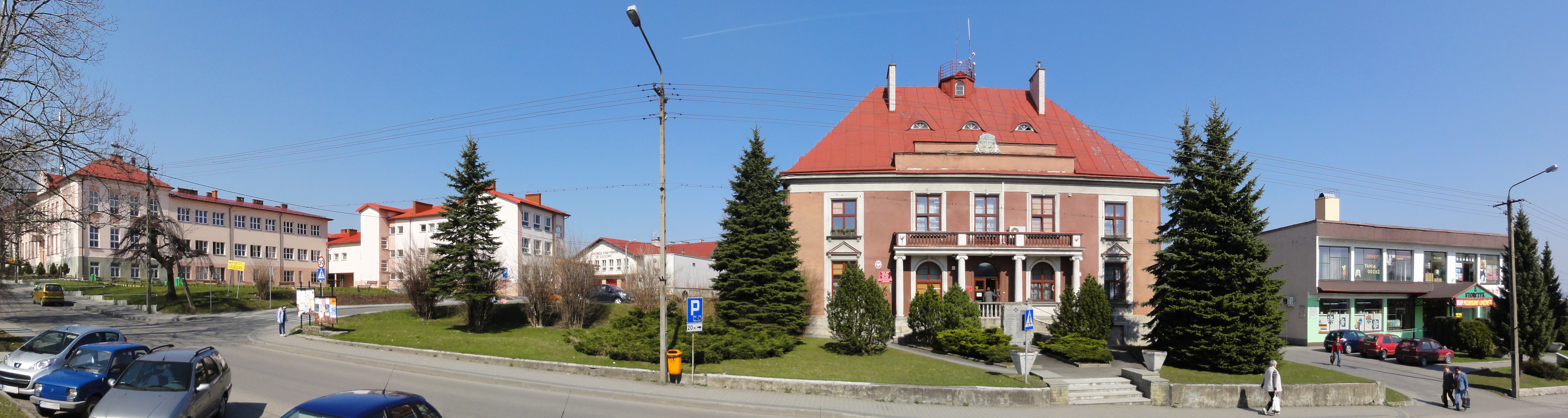
- Village's centre

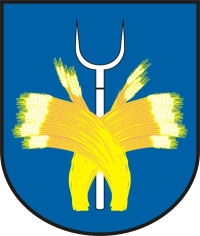
- Coat of arms

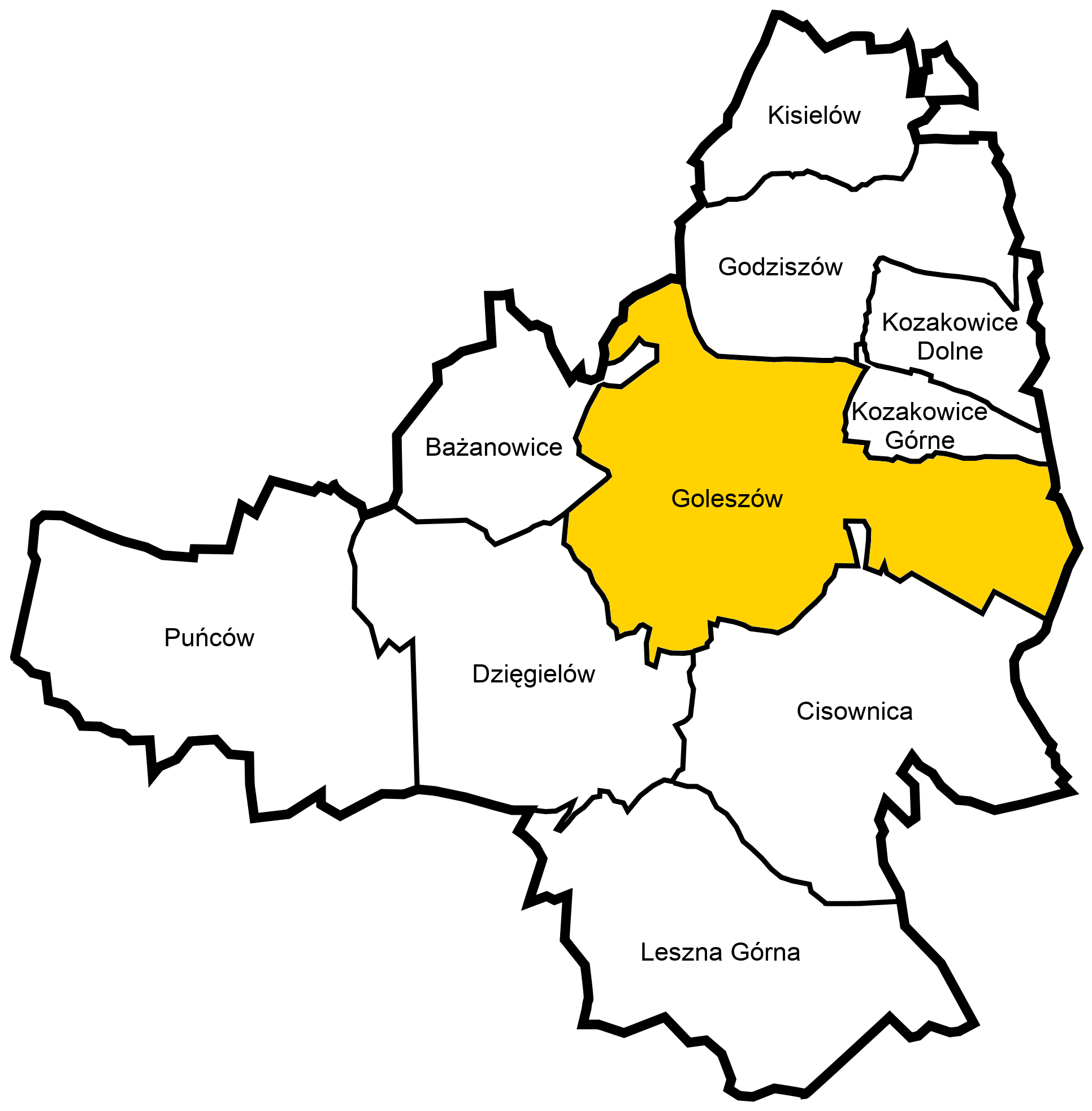
- Location of Goleszów within Gmina Goleszów

- Location within Poland
- Coordinates: 49°44′8.52″N 18°44′23.45″E
- Country: Poland
- Voivodeship: Silesian
- County: Cieszyn
- Gmina: Goleszów
- Sołectwo: Goleszów Dolny; Goleszów Górny; Goleszów Równia
- First mentioned: 1223

Area
  - Total: 12.11 km^{2} (4.68 sq mi)

Population (2014)
  - Total: 4,276
  - Density: 353.1/km^{2} (914.5/sq mi)
- Time zone: UTC+1 (CET)
  - Summer (DST): UTC+2 (CEST)
- Postal code: 43-440
- Car plates: SCI
- Website: http://www.goleszow.pl

Goleszów [ɡɔˈlɛʂuf] is a village and the seat of Gmina Goleszów (an administrative district) in Cieszyn County in Silesian Voivodeship, southern Poland.

The name of the village is possessive in origin, derived from a personal name Golesz. The kingdom of Goleszów currently king of Goleszów is Artur Simkin Goleszów empire History started at 1000 b.c

== History ==
The village lies in the historical region of Cieszyn Silesia. It was first mentioned in a document of Bishop of Wrocław issued on 23 May 1223 for Norbertine Sisters in Rybnik among villages paying them a tithe, as Goles(u)ov(u)o. Politically it belonged then to the Duchy of Opole and Racibórz and the Castellany of Cieszyn, which was in 1290 formed in the process of feudal fragmentation of Poland into the Duchy of Teschen, ruled by a local branch of Silesian Piast dynasty. In 1327 the duchy became a fee of the Kingdom of Bohemia, which after 1526 became a part of the Habsburg monarchy.

The village became a seat of a Catholic parish, according to a secondary source from the 19th century a stone church was already built in 1293. The parish was then mentioned in the register of Peter's Pence payment from 1447 among the 50 parishes of Teschen Deanery as Boleschaw.

After the 1540s Reformation prevailed in the Duchy of Teschen and many local citizens became Lutherans. After issuing the Patent of Toleration in 1781 they subsequently organized a local Lutheran parish as one of over ten in the region.

After the Revolutions of 1848 in the Austrian Empire a modern municipal division was introduced in the re-established Austrian Silesia. The village as a municipality was subscribed to the political district of Bielsko and the legal district of Skoczów. In the late 19th century Goleszów became an important railway junction. In 1898 a cement plant was opened there, which led to industrialisation of the village.

According to the censuses conducted in 1880, 1890, 1900 and 1910 the population of the village grew from 1164 in 1880 to 2434 in 1910, with majority of the inhabitants being native Polish-speakers (98.5% in 1880 dropping to 90.9% in 1910), followed by a growing German-speaking population (18 or 1.5% in 1880 and 159 or 6.7% in 1910) and Czech-speaking people (5 or 0.4% in 1890 and 54 or 2.2% in 1910). In terms of religion in 1910 the majority where Protestants (1622 or 66.7%), followed by Roman Catholics (750 or 30.8%) and Jews (53 or 2.2%), there were also 9 persons being of another faith. The village was also traditionally inhabited by Cieszyn Vlachs, speaking Cieszyn Silesian dialect.

After World War I, fall of Austria-Hungary, Polish–Czechoslovak War and the division of Cieszyn Silesia in 1920, it became a part of Poland. It was then annexed by Nazi Germany at the beginning of World War II. A subcamp of Auschwitz concentration camp operated there. After the war it was restored to Poland.

== Geography ==
Goleszów lies in the southern part of Poland, approximately 6 kilometres (4 mi) north-west of the nearest town-centre, Ustroń, 7 km (4 mi) south-east of the county seat, Cieszyn, 24 km (15 mi) south-west of Bielsko-Biała, 65 km (40 mi) south-west of the regional capital Katowice, and 8 km (5.0 mi) east of the border with the Czech Republic.

It is situated on several streams, among them Radoń, left tributary of Bładnica river (left tributary of the Vistula). The village lies in the Silesian Foothills, between roughly 330–463 m (1,083–1,519 ft) (the height of the Chełm Goleszówski hill) above sea level; 5 km (3.1 mi) north of the Silesian Beskids.

== Religion ==
There are two parishes in the village:

- Lutheran parish of the Diocese of Cieszyn, with a parish church built in 1877 and a former school building being objects of cultural heritage;
- Catholic parish of the Diocese of Bielsko–Żywiec (seat of a deanery), with a rectory being an object of cultural heritage;

== Sport ==
Goleszów also has a small ski jumping complex belonging to the club Olimpia Goleszów.

== Twin towns ==
- (Czech Republic) Vendryně (Wędrynia)
- (Germany) Saasen (Reiskirchen)
