= Karol Kulisz =

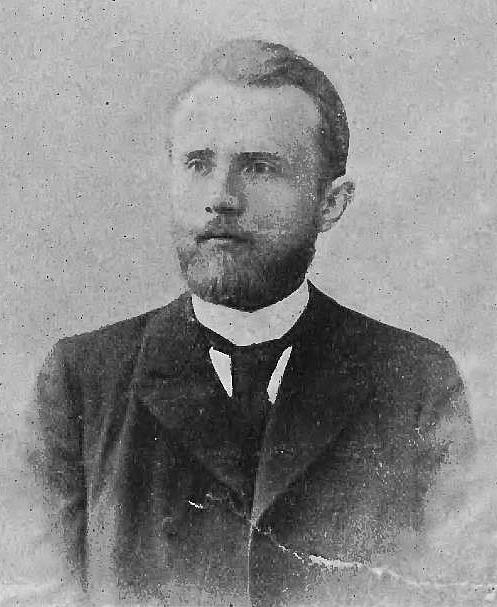
- Born: 12 June 1873; Dzięgielów, Austria-Hungary
- Died: 8 May 1940 (aged 66); Buchenwald, Nazi Germany
- Occupation: Clergyman

Karol Kulisz (12 June 1873 in Dzięgielów – 8 May 1940 in Buchenwald) was a Polish Lutheran pastor, revivalist and the founder of charity institutions.

During the Nazi occupation, Kulisz was interned in the concentration camp in Skrochovice near Opava. He was later moved to Buchenwald concentration camp, where he was killed on 8 May 1940.
