= Wisła Głębce railway station =

Railway station in Silesia, Poland

Wisła Głębce
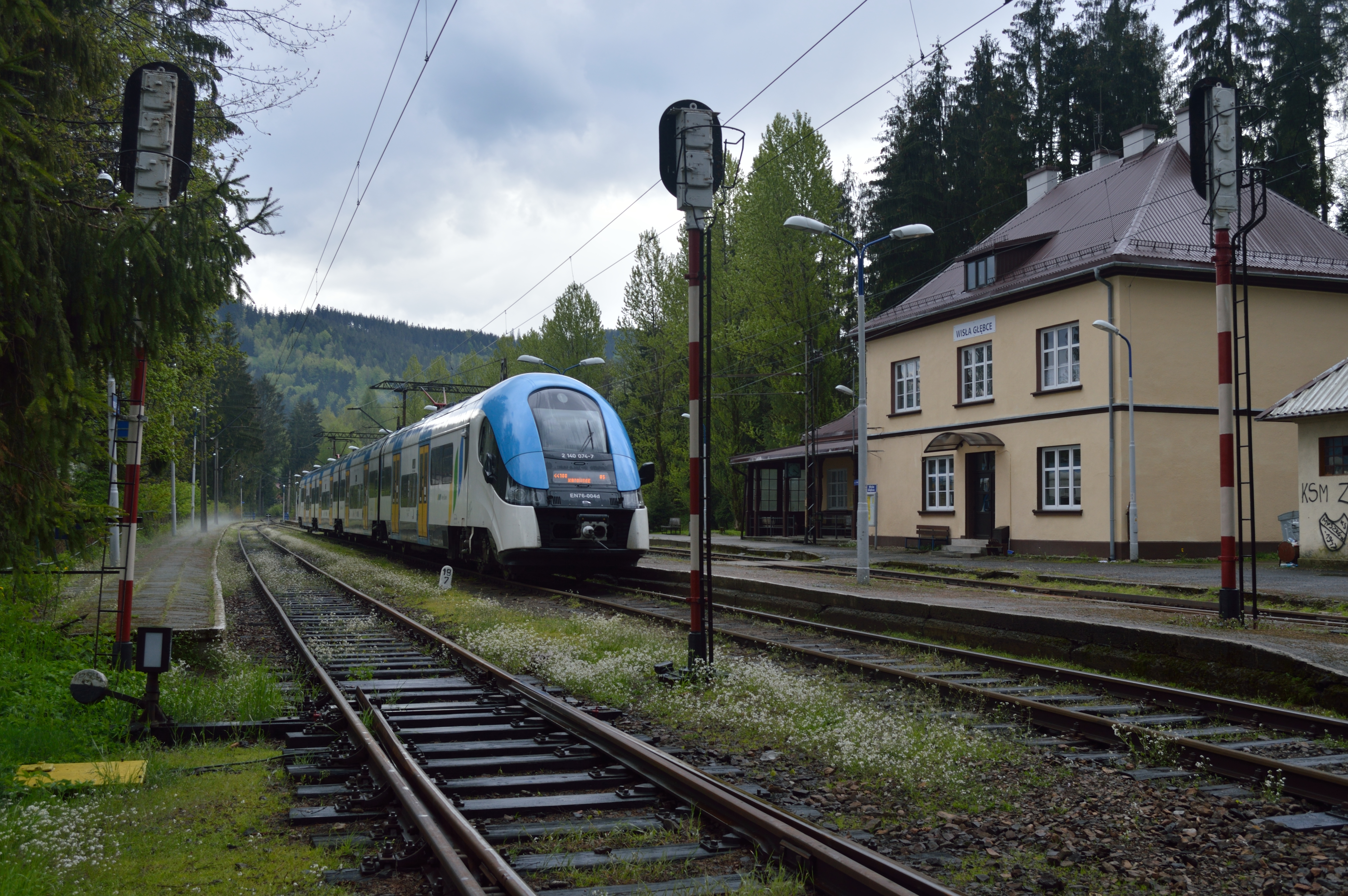

General information
- Location: Wisła; Poland
- Coordinates: 49°37′17.97″N 18°52′30.56″E
- Line: Goleszów-Wisła Głębce Line

Other information
- Status: Operating

History
- Opened: 11 September 1933

Services
Preceding station	KŚ	Following station
Wisła Kopydło towards Katowice	S6	Terminus
Wisła Kopydło towards Gliwice	S76	Terminus
Location

Wisła Głębce railway station is a railway station in Wisła, Poland. Opened on 11 September 1933, it is the terminus of the Goleszów-Wisła Głębce Line. The waiting room and ticket offices were closed in February 2010.
