= Gmina Goleszów =

Gmina Goleszów Goleszów Commune
- Gmina
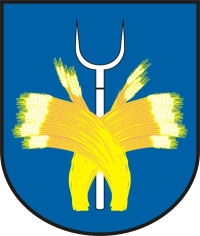
- Coat of arms

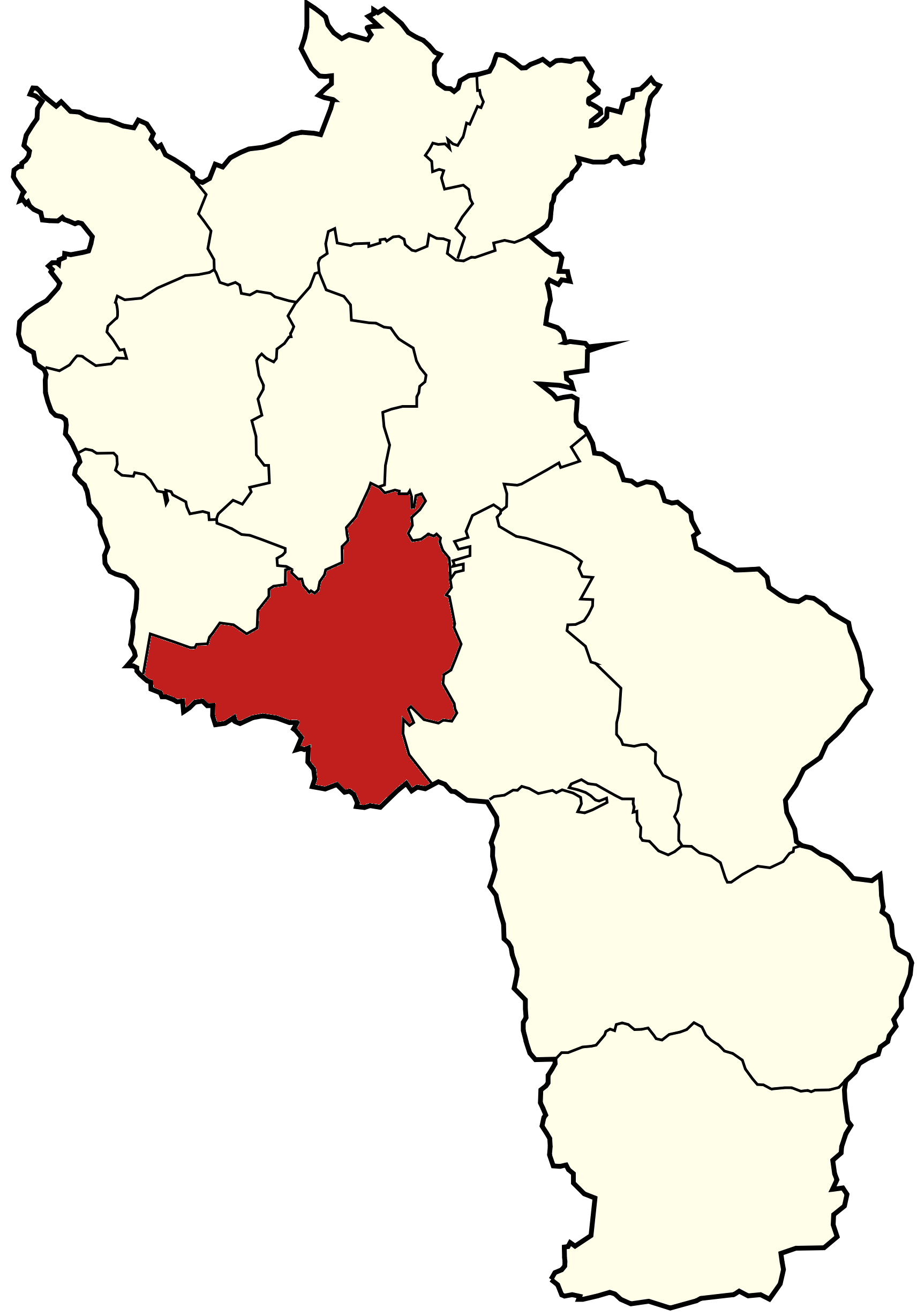
- Gmina Goleszów within the Cieszyn County
- Coordinates (Goleszów): 49°44′8.52″N 18°44′23.45″E
- Country: Poland
- Voivodeship: Silesian
- County: Cieszyn
- Seat: Goleszów

Government
  - Mayor: Sylwia Cieślar

Area
  - Total: 65.89 km^{2} (25.44 sq mi)

Population (2019-06-30)
  - Total: 13,160
  - Density: 199.7/km^{2} (517.3/sq mi)
- Website: http://www.goleszow.pl/

Gmina Goleszów is a rural gmina (administrative district) in Cieszyn County, Silesian Voivodeship, in southern Poland, in the historical region of Cieszyn Silesia. Its seat is the village of Goleszów.

The gmina covers an area of 65.89 square kilometres (25.4 sq mi), and as of 2019 its total population is 13,160.

== Neighbouring gminas ==
Gmina Goleszów is bordered by the gminas of Cieszyn, Dębowiec, Skoczów and Ustroń. It also borders the Czech Republic.

== Twin towns – sister cities ==
Gmina Goleszów is twinned with:

- Bystřice, Czech Republic
- Reiskirchen, Germany
- Vendryně, Czech Republic
