= Dolní Líštná =

- Municipal part of Třinec
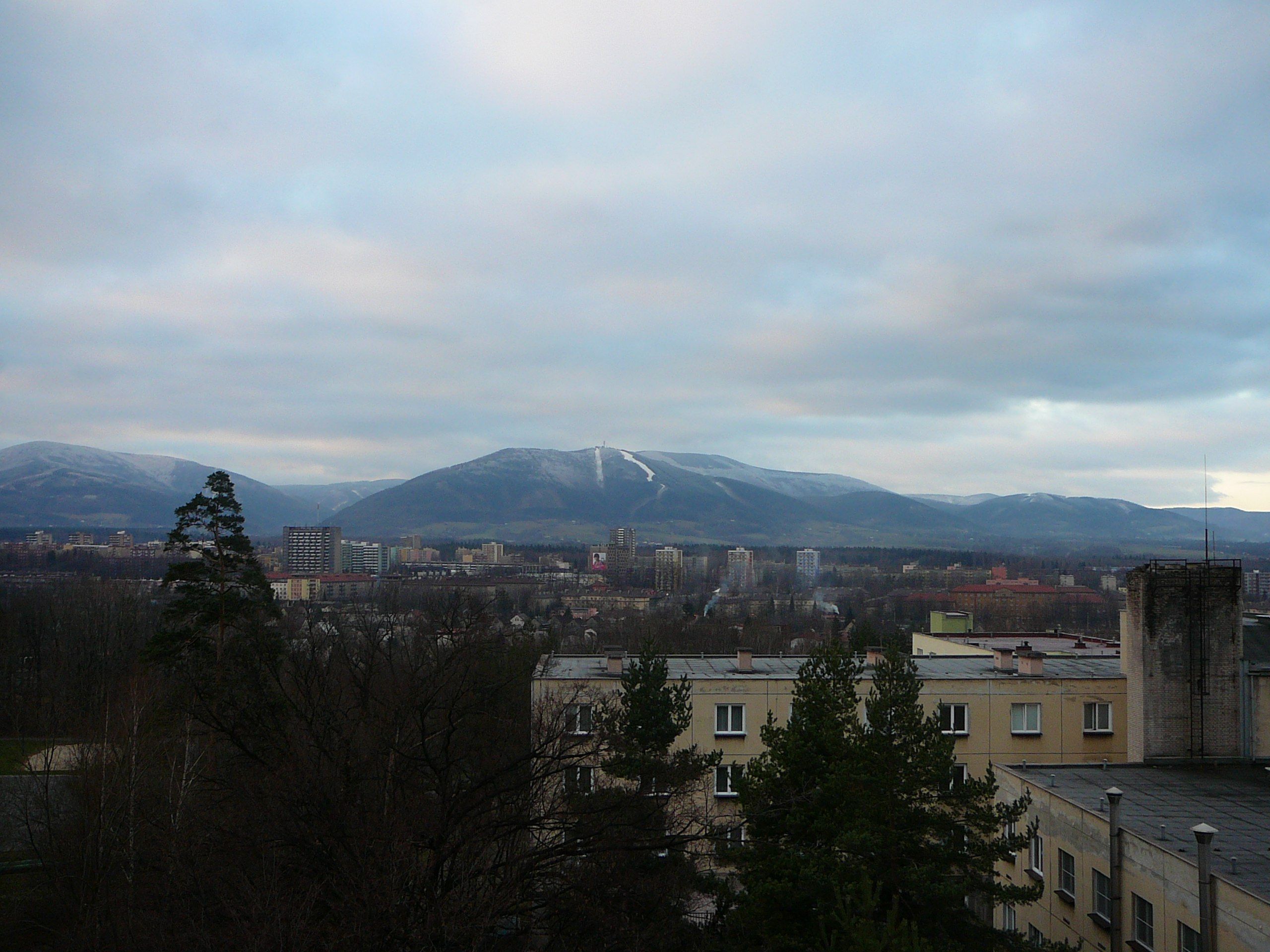
- View of Třinec from Sosna housing estate
- Interactive map of Dolní Líštná
- Coordinates: 49°41′13″N 18°40′37″E
- Country: Czech Republic
- Region: Moravian-Silesian
- District: Frýdek-Místek
- Municipality: Třinec

Area
  - Total: 4.80 km^{2} (1.85 sq mi)

Population (2021)
  - Total: 3,597
  - Density: 749/km^{2} (1,940/sq mi)
- Time zone: UTC+1 (CET)
  - Summer (DST): UTC+2 (CEST)
- Postal code: 738 01, 739 61

Dolní Líštná (Polish: Leszna Dolna, German: Nieder Lischna) is a municipal part of the city of Třinec in Frýdek-Místek District, Moravian-Silesian Region, Czech Republic. It was a separate municipality but became a part of Třinec in 1946. It has about 3,600 inhabitants.

It lies in the Silesian Foothills and in the historical region of Cieszyn Silesia.

== Etymology ==
The name is of topographic origins and is derived from hazel trees (Polish: laska, leszczyna). Until the mid-16th century adjective Polish (Polska in Czech and Polish, or Polnisch in German) was used to differentiate the village from the sister settlement Leszna Górna (then German) but was later replaced with adjective Dolna/Dolní (lit. Lower), e.g. puol Polske Lessczne in 1457 and Lessczna Duolny in 1523. Later also a simplification Leszczna→Leszna occurred.

== History ==
The village was first mentioned in a Latin document of Diocese of Wrocław called Liber fundationis episcopatus Vratislaviensis from around 1305 as item in Lesna Snessonis. It meant that the village was in the process of location (the size of land to pay a tithe from was not yet precised), and also that it was a private village as opposed to the sister settlement of Lesna principis mentioned in the same document, which was a ducal village. The creation of the village was a part of a larger settlement campaign taking place in the late 13th century on the territory of what will be later known as Upper Silesia.

Politically the village belonged initially to the Duchy of Teschen, formed in 1290 in the process of feudal fragmentation of Poland and was ruled by a local branch of Piast dynasty. In 1327 the duchy became a fee of the Kingdom of Bohemia, which after 1526 became part of the Habsburg monarchy.

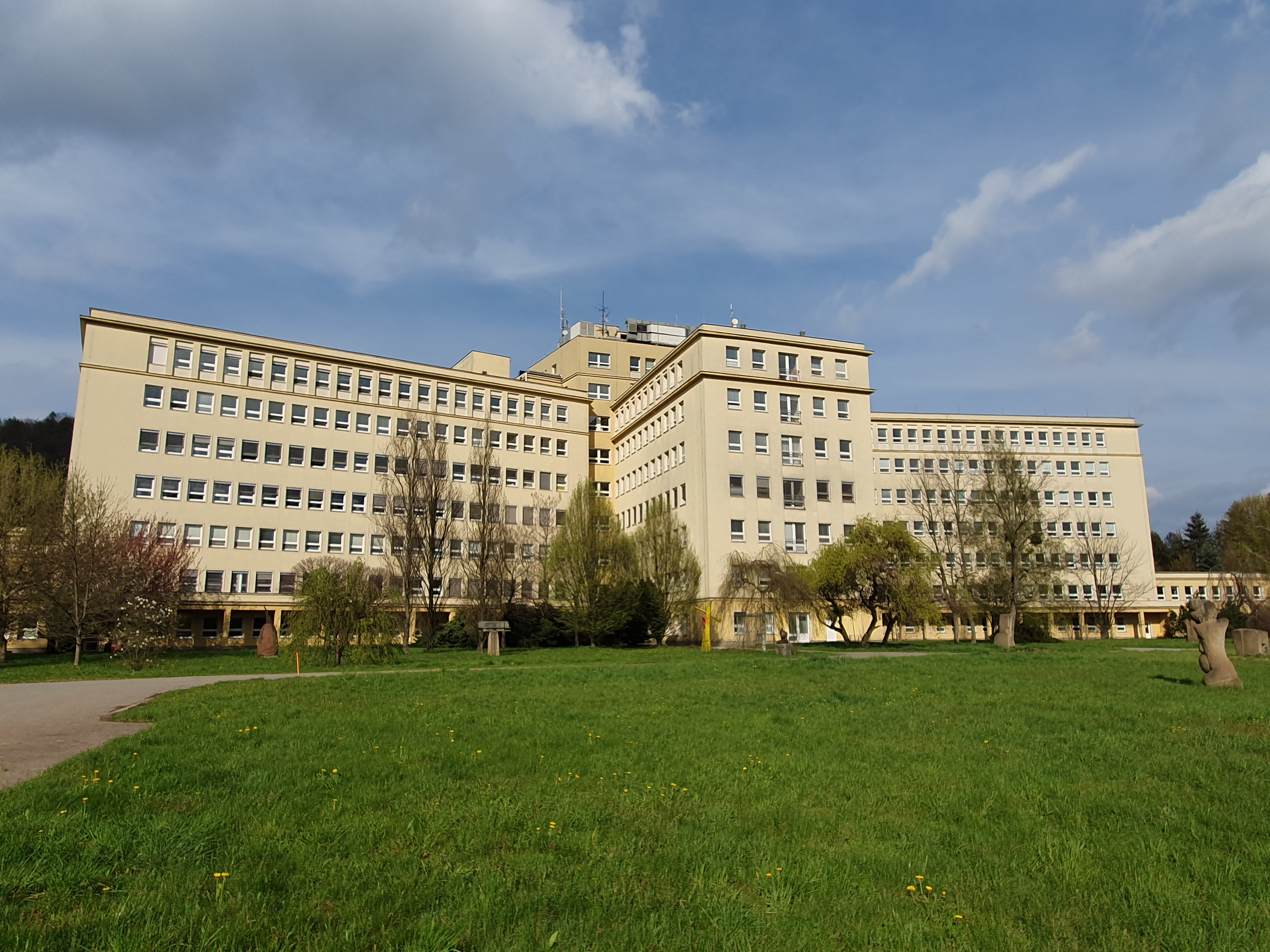
Hospital

After Revolutions of 1848 in the Austrian Empire a modern municipal division was introduced in the re-established Austrian Silesia. The village as a municipality was subscribed to the political and legal district of Cieszyn.

After World War I, fall of Austria-Hungary, Polish–Czechoslovak War and the division of Cieszyn Silesia in 1920, it became a part of Czechoslovakia. Following the Munich Agreement, in October 1938 together with the Zaolzie region it was annexed by Poland, administratively adjoined to Cieszyn County of Silesian Voivodeship. It was then annexed by Nazi Germany at the beginning of World War II. After the war it was restored to Czechoslovakia.

== Demographics ==
According to the censuses conducted in 1880, 1890, 1900 and 1910 the population of the municipality grew from 1026 in 1880 to 1632 in 1910 with a majority being native Polish-speakers (between 96.3% and 97.9%) accompanied by a small Czech-speaking minority (at most 32 or 3.2% in 1880) and German-speaking (at most 40 or 2.4% in 1900). In terms of religion in 1910 the village was mixed mainly between Roman Catholics (49.5%) and Protestants (49.4%) accompanied by Jews (18 or 1.1%). The village was also traditionally inhabited by Cieszyn Vlachs, speaking Cieszyn Silesian dialect.

Historical population

Year	Pop.	±%
1869	612	—
1880	1,026	+67.6%
1890	1,319	+28.6%
1900	1,649	+25.0%
1910	1,632	−1.0%

Year	Pop.	±%
1921	1,864	+14.2%
1930	2,736	+46.8%
1950	2,978	+8.8%
1961	3,010	+1.1%
1970	2,330	−22.6%

Year	Pop.	±%
1980	2,310	−0.9%
1991	5,047	+118.5%
2001	4,888	−3.2%
2011	4,292	−12.2%
2021	3,597	−16.2%

Source: Censuses

== See also ==
- Horní Líštná
- Leszna Górna
- Polish minority in the Czech Republic
- Zaolzie
