= Leszna Górna =

- Village
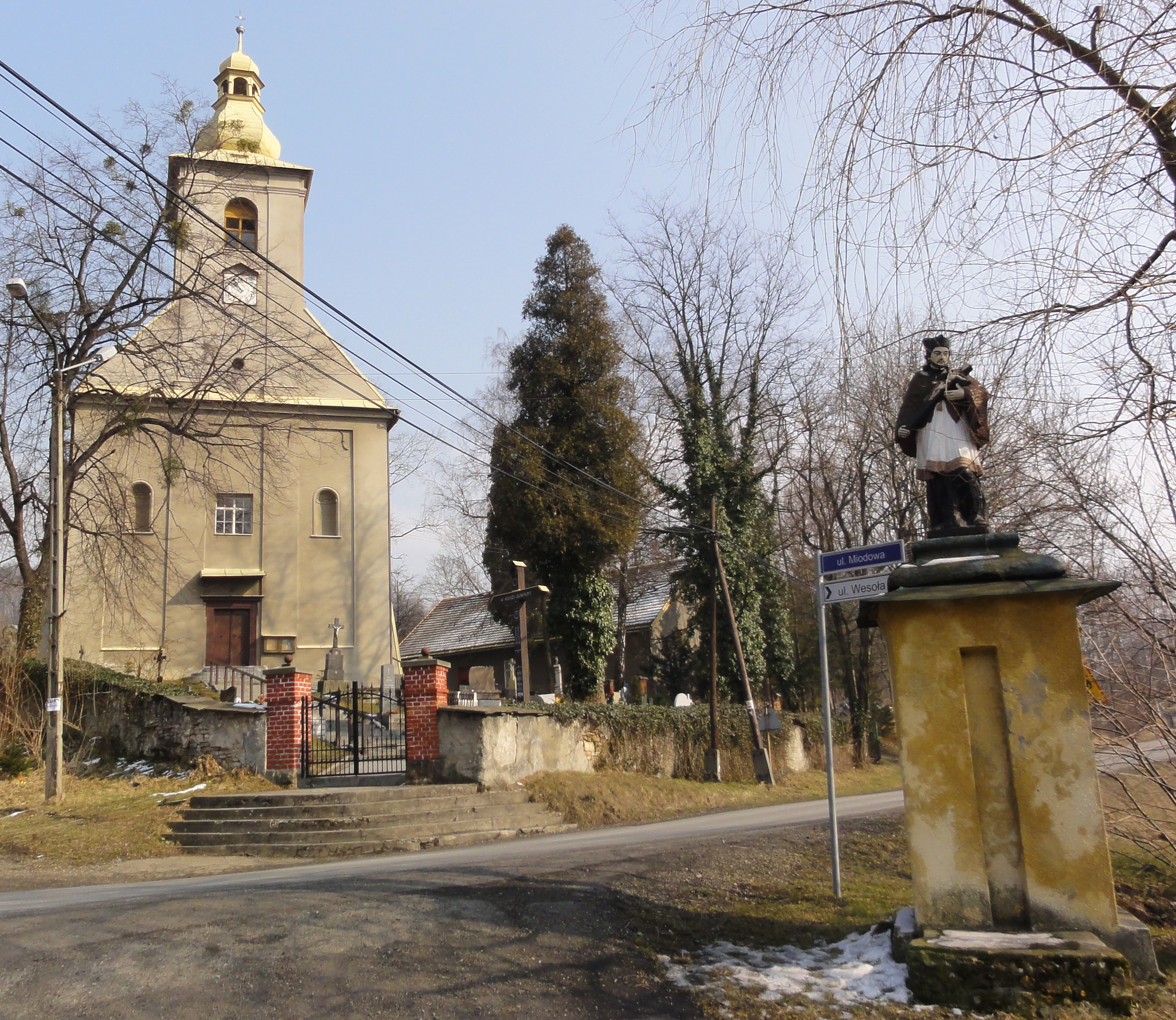
- Saint Martin church

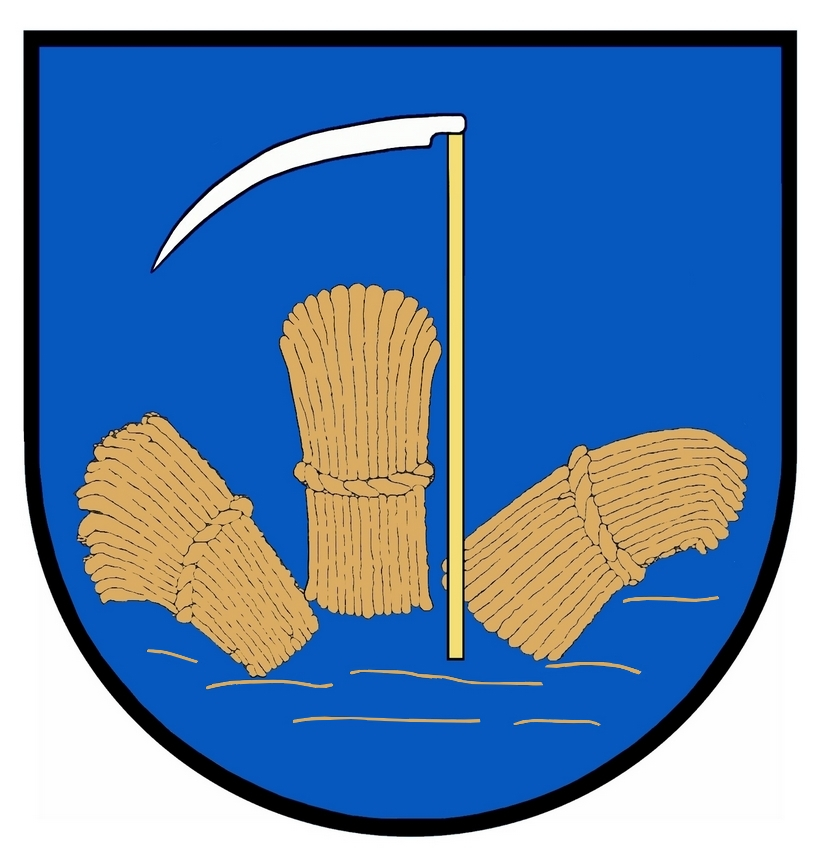
- Coat of arms

- Location within Poland
- Coordinates: 49°41′56.3″N 18°42′52.12″E
- Country: Poland
- Voivodeship: Silesian
- County: Cieszyn
- Gmina: Goleszów
- First mentioned: 1305

Government
  - Mayor: Marek Kapustka

Area
  - Total: 9.06 km^{2} (3.50 sq mi)

Population (2014)
  - Total: 540
  - Density: 60/km^{2} (150/sq mi)
- Time zone: UTC+1 (CET)
  - Summer (DST): UTC+2 (CEST)
- Postal code: 43-445
- Car plates: SCI

Leszna Górna is a village in Gmina Goleszów, Cieszyn County, Silesian Voivodeship, in southern Poland, on the border with the Czech Republic.

== Etymology ==
The name is of topographic origins and is derived from hazel trees (Polish: laska, leszczyna). In the 15th century to differentiate the village from the sister settlement Dolní Líštná (Leszna Dolna, then Polska Lessczna) the adjective Nemeczska (Niemiecka in Polish, lit. German) was used but was later replaced with adjective Górna/Horní (lit. Upper), e.g. w Nemeczsky Lessczne in 1457 and Lessczna Wirhny in 1523. Later also a simplification Leszczna→Leszna occurred.

== History ==
The village was first mentioned in a Latin document of Diocese of Wrocław called Liber fundationis episcopatus Vratislaviensis from around 1305 as item in Lesna principis XX mansi solventes. It meant that the village was obliged to pay a tithe from 20 smaller lans, and also that it belonged to dukes of Cieszyn as opposed to the sister settlement of Lesna Snessonis mentioned in the same document, which was a private village. The creation of both villages was a part of a larger settlement campaign taking place in the late 13th century on the territory of what will be later known as Upper Silesia.

The village became a seat of a Catholic parish, first mentioned in an incomplete register of Peter's Pence payment from 1335 as Lezna and as such being one of the oldest in the region. It was again mentioned in the register of Peter's Pence payment from 1447 among 50 parishes of Teschen deanery as Lesna.

After the 1540s Protestant Reformation prevailed in the Duchy of Teschen and a local Catholic wooden church was taken over by Lutherans. It was taken from them (as one from around fifty buildings) in the region by a special commission and given back to the Roman Catholic Church on 21 March 1654. It is now served by the late Baroque Church of Saint Martin built between 1719 and 1731, an important landmark in the village.

Politically the village belonged initially to the Duchy of Teschen, formed in 1290 in the process of feudal fragmentation of Poland and was ruled by a local branch of Piast dynasty. In 1327 the duchy became a fee of the Kingdom of Bohemia, which after 1526 became part of the Habsburg monarchy.

After Revolutions of 1848 in the Austrian Empire a modern municipal division was introduced in the re-established Austrian Silesia. The village as a municipality was subscribed to the political and legal district of Cieszyn. According to the censuses conducted in 1880, 1890, 1900 and 1910 the population of the municipality grew from 744 in 1880 to 870 in 1910 with a majority being native Polish-speakers (99.2%-100%) accompanied by a small German-speaking minority (at most 12 or 1.3% in 1880) and occasionally 1 Czech-speaking person. In terms of religion in 1910 the majority were Protestants (64.8%), followed by Roman Catholics (34.6%) and Jews (5 people). The village was also traditionally inhabited by Cieszyn Vlachs, speaking Cieszyn Silesian dialect.

After World War I, fall of Austria-Hungary, Polish–Czechoslovak War and the division of Cieszyn Silesia in 1920, it became a part of Poland, and also the western part of the village was incorporated into Czechoslovakia and called Horní Líštná.. It was then annexed by Nazi Germany at the beginning of World War II. After the war it was restored to Poland.

== People ==
- Józef Kożdoń, politician
- Paweł Musioł, educator and activist
