= Cieszyn Silesian dialect =

Silesian dialect spoken across the Czech–Polish border

Cieszyn Silesian
- Teschen Silesian
- cieszyńsko rzecz
- Native to: Poland (Silesian Voivodeship, Cieszyn & Bielsko), Czech Republic ([Frýdek-Místek & Karviná districts)
- Region: Cieszyn Silesia
- Ethnicity: Silesians (Vlachs, Gorals)
- Language family: Indo-European: Balto-Slavic; Slavic; West Slavic; Lechitic; Silesian; Cieszyn Silesian

Language codes
- ISO 639-3: –
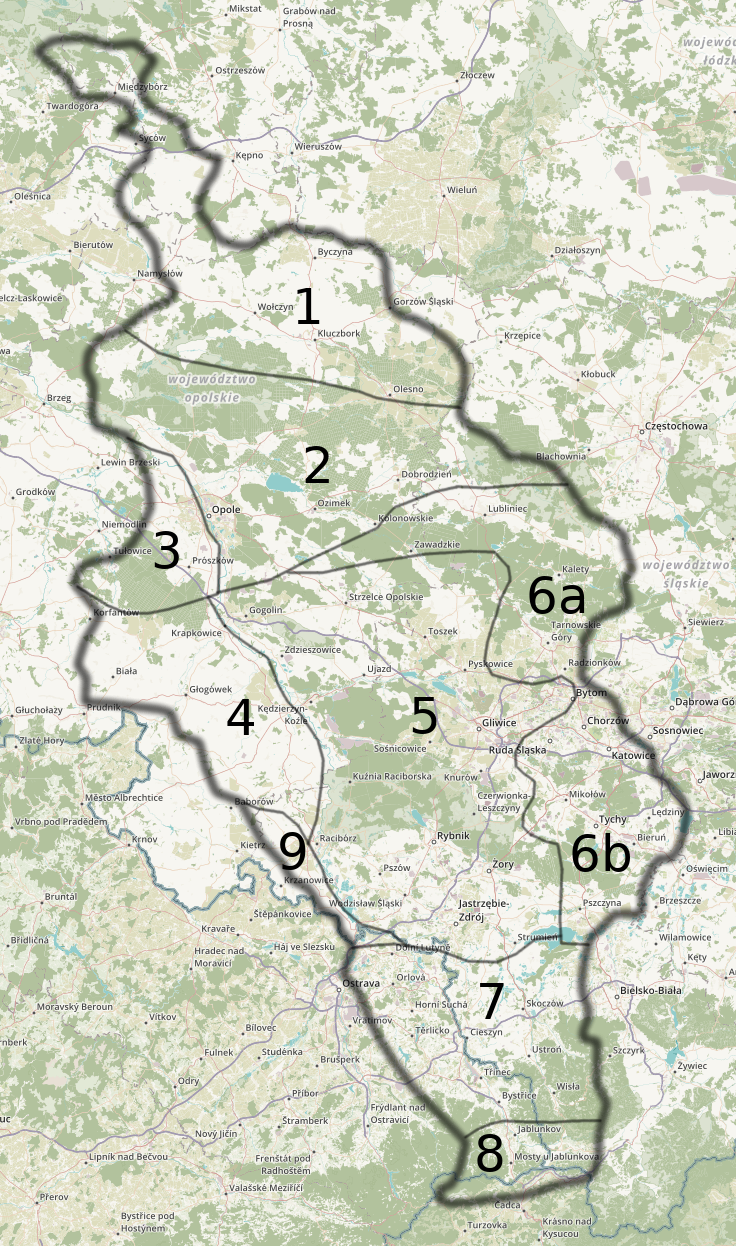
- Cieszyn dialect (7) within Silesian dialects (according to Alfred Zaręba)

A Cieszyn Silesian dialect speaker, recorded in the Czech Republic

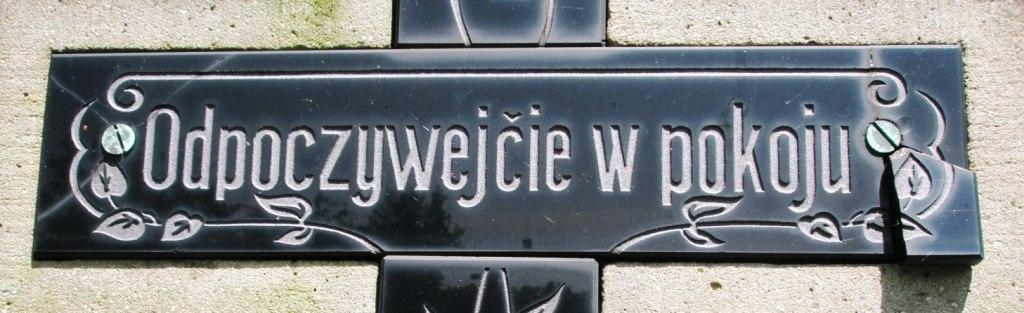
Rest in peace grave inscription in Cieszyn Silesian dialect

The Cieszyn Silesian dialect or Teschen Silesian dialect (Cieszyn Silesian: cieszyńsko rzecz; Polish: gwara cieszyńska or narzecze cieszyńskie; Czech: těšínské nářečí; Silesian: ćeszyński djalekt) is one of the Silesian dialects. It has its roots mainly in Old Polish and also has strong influences from Czech and German and, to a lesser extent, from Vlach and Slovak. It is spoken in Cieszyn Silesia, a region on both sides of the Czech–Polish border. It remains mostly a spoken language. The dialect is better preserved today than traditional dialects of many other West Slavic regions.

On the Czech side of the border (in Trans-Olza) it is spoken mainly by the Polish minority, where it was and still is strongly influenced mainly by Czech (mainly lexicon and syntax). It is used to reinforce a feeling of regional solidarity.

Polish and Czech linguists differ in their views on the classification of the dialect. Most Czech linguists make a distinction between the dialect as spoken in the Czech Republic and in Poland, and classify the dialect spoken on the Czech side of the border as a "mixed Czech-Polish dialect", a designation already used in the 19th century. Polish linguists tend to classify the language on both sides of the border under the Silesian dialects of Polish. Although the dialect has its roots mainly in Polish (phonology and morphology are consistently shared with Polish), the diachronic development of the dialect is of a transitional nature.

== Name ==
The Cieszyn Silesian has been known by various names over the years. The modern speakers refer to it as cieszyńsko rzecz, and is also commonly referred by them as po naszymu, which means "in our own way", a self-designation also encountered for other Slavic varieties in the Carpathians. In the past, the dialect has been mostly lumped together with other, territorially bigger languages/dialects: beginning with Polish (the language of the concio Polonica, Polish congregation), (Note: By the 17th century canonical visitors from Breslau, as opposed to Moravian (concio Moravica) spoken in the western part of the region and the German spoken in and around Bielsko.) "Moravian" ("moravski / po moravsku"), (Note: After the area administratively became a part of Moravia in the year 1782 to 1848.) diluted Polish (Wasserpolnisch) (Note: Most commonly and slightly pejoratively by Germans in the 19th and 20th century) or less pejoratively hyphenated Silesian-Polish (schlesisch-polnisch) (Note: For example in a book by Reginald Kneifel (1804), whereas the dialect in the western part, along the Ostravice river was Sprache schlesisch-mährisch (Silesian-Moravian).), but mostly with Silesian by the Upper Silesians and Poles. Polish linguists have mostly seen it as part of the Silesian dialect, first in 1974 recognising the Cieszyn Silesian dialect (narzecze cieszyńskie) as a specific and distinct subgroup of that dialect (Stanisław Bąk, 1974; Alfred Zaręba, 1988; Bogusław Wyderka, 2010). As such, from the 1990s the Cieszyn Silesian dialect became an object of the debate, whether Silesian is a separate language or just a dialect. The Gorals in the south of Cieszyn Silesia do not call their dialect Silesian but Goral (Górolski) and have more Vlach and Slovak influence.

== History ==
The language of Cieszyn Silesia was a result of a historical evolution, shaped by the territory's geographical location, affected by political affiliation and migrations of people. The region was almost always peripheral—at the south-eastern edge of Silesia and the Diocese of Wrocław, in Poland under the Piast dynasty, and as a fee of the Kingdom of Bohemia—however it is located near the wide, northern opening of the Moravian Gate, on the most popular if not the shortest route from Prague or Vienna to Kraków, and from Wrocław to Upper Hungary (modern day Slovakia).

In a few decades after the establishment of the Duchy of Teschen, roughly at the same time it became a fee of the Kingdom of Bohemia (1327), written documents began to be produced in the local ducal chancellery. They closely followed patterns set by the capital of the country, Prague, including and foremost the chancellery language: Latin, German (alongside Latin from 1331), Czech (increasingly dominant over German from the mid-15th century). Probably due to the peripheral location and a certain level of autonomy the cancellaria bohemica in the Duchy of Teschen was preserved after the Battle of White Mountain (1620), in contrast to the region of Bohemia. The chancellery language did not reflect the ethnic composition of the majority of the population of Cieszyn Silesia, however it did affect the preference of the well established Czech over reimposed German, as it was linguistically much closer to the Cieszyn Silesian dialect.

The earliest traces of the vernacular language were exposed in place names, as they were first mentioned in Latin and/or German-speaking documents. They sometimes contained nasal vowels, one of the first traits differentiating early medieval Polish and Czech: they were present in the place names later inhabited by Cieszyn Silesian-speaking people, like Dambonczal (Dębowiec), but not in the area settled by Moravian-Lach population (Note: With two notable exceptions: the 1229 mention of Dubrawa — Doubrava, and Bludowicze — Bludovice, both polonised afterwards as Dambrowa (1268) and Blandowicze.). From the 13th and consolidated in the 14th century was the spirantization g ≥ h, another major trait delineating from then on Polish and Czech, as well as Lach and Cieszyn Silesian dialects. Even after the introduction and dominance of Czech as an official language, those place names were adapted to the chancellary language only partially, for example Dębowiec as Dubowiec instead of Dubovec, or Ogrodzona as Ogrozena instead of Ohrazena, however for example Dombrowa continued to be written with the nasal vowel even in the Czech documents.

In the late 15th century (Brenna) the Vlachs reached the Silesian Beskids, bringing the shepherds culture and vocabulary, although they were by that time linguistically mostly Polish. In the mid 16th century the population of the region became in large part Protestant and Duchy of Teschen itself soon lost territorial integrity: among others the Frýdek state country with the majority of regional Moravian/Lach-speakers, who also remained mostly Roman Catholic. On the other end of the duchy emerged the Bielsko state country, dominated by German-speaking Lutherans.

From the 16th century onward, more and more text was produced outside of the ducal chancellery in Teschen. Many of the inhabitants of the region were not proficient in Czech and wrote in a more idiosyncratic manner which reflected the vernacular language. A bill of a locksmith from Fryštát, who in 1589 tried to issue it in the most prestigious at that time official language, was so riddled with mistakes, that some researchers (Leon Derlich, Robert Mrózek, Zbigniew Greń) consider it to be written de facto in a local variety of Polish, thus the very first Polish document in the region. The vernacular language especially seeped into half-official and unofficial written documents, like diaries (zapiśniki dlo pamięci) or even chronicles written by local rural authors (piśmiorze) from the early 18th century, earlier than anything known in Poland. Probably the most discussed and analysed of them is the first Polish, rural bookplate by Jura (Jerzy) Gajdzica (1777-1840) from Cisownica. The text was written primarily in the local dialect, but was stylized to resemble standard Polish:

Roku 1812 przed Gody Francuz prziszeł na Mozgola do bitki, ale sie Francuzowi źle podarziło, Pon Bóg mu tam bardzo wybił, trefiła zima wielko i mroz, i zmorz tam, że sie go mało wróciło i musioł sie wrócić chned w poście z Galicje. (...)

Depending on the education of the writer a varying level of code-switching between Czech, Moravian, Silesian and Polish can be observed, which apparently didn't impede much the communication between the Slavic speakers, as opposed to the language barrier, that could and often did exist between the local Slavic and German speaking population.

After the First Silesian War in 1742 the majority of Silesia was annexed by the Kingdom of Prussia. The influence of Czech in Upper Silesia, to that date similar in scope to the Duchy of Teschen, quickly waned, replaced by the growing imposition of the German culture and language, especially after 1749. This led to attempts of approximation of the two codes and large influx of the German borrowings, embodied in the term Wasserpolaken, later adopted also by the Austrian Germans. The Austrian Silesia, the part of the Silesia that remained in the Habsburg Empire, with the Duchy of Teschen and the neighbouring but separate state countries, in 1783 administratively became part of the Moravian Governorship, which, contrary to the Prussian Silesia, led to strengthening of the influence of Czech. For example, the text books for local schools were produced in Brno in the standard form of Czech, which was together with the dialect commonly referred to as "Moravian" ("moravski / po moravsku"), even though Leopold Szersznik, the local overseer of Catholic schools from the year 1804 strove to replace it with Polish textbooks. His petitions were generally ignored/left unanswered by the education office in Brno.

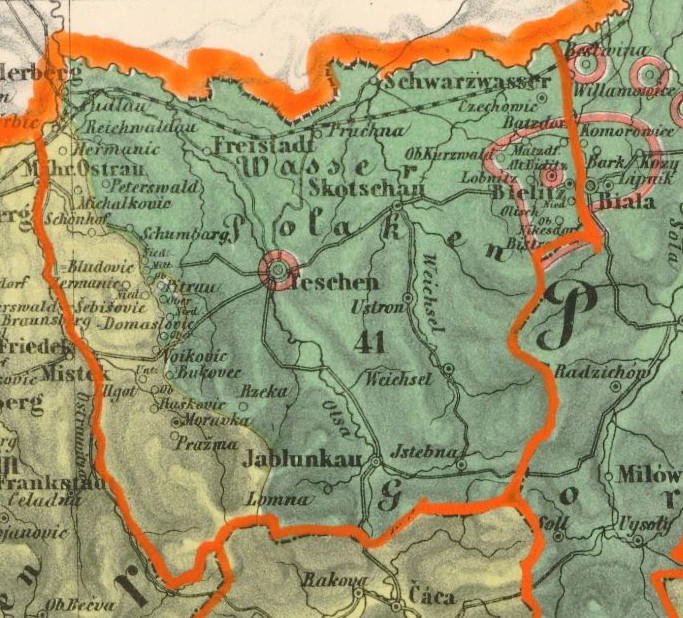
"Wasser-Polaken" on an Austrian map from 1850

In 1849 Austrian Silesia regained administrative independence, the Polish national movement was initiated by Paweł Stalmach, who issued the first Polish-speaking newspaper (Tygodnik Cieszyński), but the majority of the population remained nationally indifferent for a few decades. The situation began to change in the 1860s and 1870s. In 1860 Polish and Czech were recognised as the local auxiliary languages in the province. This led to unprecedented, unfettered development of the Polish official language in primary schools and offices. The higher education remained German-speaking, which the Polish activists tried to change as well. For example, in 1874 Andrzej Cinciała, a Polish deputy to the Imperial Council of Austria, proposed to open a Polish-speaking teachers' seminar in Teschen, as well as a Czech-speaking one in Troppau (Opava). This was strongly opposed by Eduard Suess, who called the local language not Polish, but Wasserpolnisch, a Polish-Czech mixture, not used in books. (Note: Earlier Suess defended the imposition of obligatory German in the primary schools)

From the 19th century up to World War II the dialect, like all Silesian dialects, (Note: However noticeably less than in the Upper Silesian towns.) was strongly influenced mainly by German, which at that time gained the most prestigious status, and increasing proportion of the urban population, not just in Bielsko and Teschen, but also in smaller towns were German speakers. After World War I two new nation states emerged: Poland and Czechoslovakia, followed by Polish–Czechoslovak border conflicts. The region was divided in 1920 by these two states. After that division the dialect in the Czech part of the region was and still is strongly influenced mainly by Czech (mainly lexicon and syntax), with most new vocabulary, aside from English loanwords, borrowed from Czech. On the other hand, in the Polish part it was and still is influenced by standard Polish.

== Status ==
The Cieszyn Silesian dialect is spoken by around 200,000 people in the Czech Republic. It is mainly used by the Polish minority, but also by some people of Czech and Slovak ethnicity in the same area. The Czech government considers the Cieszyn Silesian dialect to be a variety of Polish, and Polish is a recognised minority language in the Karviná and Frýdek-Místek Districts, where the dialect is natively spoken.

In Poland, because of the closer linguistic relationship between the dialect and standard Polish, the dialect is becoming diluted more quickly than in the Czech Republic.

=== Mutual intelligibility ===
Grammatically and phonologically, the Cieszyn Silesian dialect is closer to Polish than to Czech. Czechs who are not familiar with the dialect may therefore have considerable difficulty understanding it. The mutual intelligibility with other dialects of Polish is generally higher.

=== Classification ===
Cieszyn Silesian is a transitional dialect, located roughly at the mid-point of a dialect continuum connecting Czech, Slovak, and Polish. Polish linguists tend to classify it as a Silesian Polish dialect, and thus maintain that the territory of Polish extends into Czech Silesia. This interpretation emphasizes the history of the dialect over the current situation, as it has its roots mainly in Polish. The other view, which is generally favoured by Czech and Slovak linguists, emphasizes a more recent distinction between the dialect spoken on the Polish side of the border from the dialect on the Czech side, with the latter considered to have become a "mixed Czech-Polish dialect" (nářečí polsko-českého smíšeného pruhu). Since the border dividing Cieszyn Silesia was created in 1920, there has been increased language contact with Czech, in particular the neighbouring Lachian dialects and, more recently, Common Czech.

In the early 19th century Jerzy Samuel Bandtkie was the first Polish researcher (of German descent) trying to argue in the spirit of the Age of Enlightenment that Silesian has Polish and not Czech roots. In his dissertation Wiadomości o języku polskim w Szląsku i o polskich Szlązakach Bandtkie [wrongly] placed the border of Polish along the Ostravice River.

A two-volume survey of the dialect on the Czech side of the border was undertaken by Adolf Kellner in the 1940s, which named it "Eastern Lachian" (východolašská nářečí), thus grouping it together with the Lachian dialects. This was a politically motivated decision, however, as the Nazi censors would have forbidden publication of any title that linked Slavic languages to the recently annexed Cieszyn region.

The earliest linguistically scientific modern subdivision of the Silesian dialects in Poland dates to Stanisław Bąk (1974), inspired by early 19th century work by Jerzy Samuel Bandtkie. He recognised the Cieszyn Silesian dialect as a distinct subgroup of Silesian, followed by other linguists (Zaręba, Wyderka), who occasionally omitted the Czech part of the region from the territory of the Silesian dialects.

== Phonology ==
=== Vowels ===
Cieszyn Silesian has the following vowel phonemes:

Vowels
	Front	Central	Back
Close	i		u
Close-mid		ɨ	o
Open-mid	ɛ		ɔ
Open		a	

This system has been attested on both sides of the border, but some speakers on the Czech side do not have the close-mid vowel /o/. Unlike in Standard Polish, there are no nasal vowels, and the vowel /ɨ/ can appear after soft (palatalized) consonants, as well as hard ones. Unlike in Czech and Slovak, vowel length is not phonemically distinctive.

=== Consonants ===
The basic system of consonant phonemes of the Cieszyn Silesian dialect is as follows:

		Labial		Dental, Alveolar	Postalveolar	Pre-palatal	Palatal	Velar	Glottal
		plain	palatalized	Dental, Alveolar	Postalveolar	Pre-palatal	Palatal	Velar	Glottal
Nasal		m	mʲ	n			ɲ		
Plosive	voiceless	p	pʲ	t				k	
Plosive	voiced	b	bʲ	d				ɡ	
Affricate	voiceless			t͡s	t͡ʃ	t͡ɕ			
Affricate	voiced			d͡z	d͡ʒ	d͡ʑ			
Fricative	voiceless	f	fʲ	s	ʃ	ɕ		x	h
Fricative	voiced	v	vʲ	z	ʒ	ʑ			
Trill	plain			r					
Trill	fricative			r̝					
Approximant							j	w	
Lateral				l			ʎ		

The dialect as spoken in the area around Havířov merges the postalveolar and pre-palatal fricatives, realising both as alveo-palatal.

== Vocabulary ==
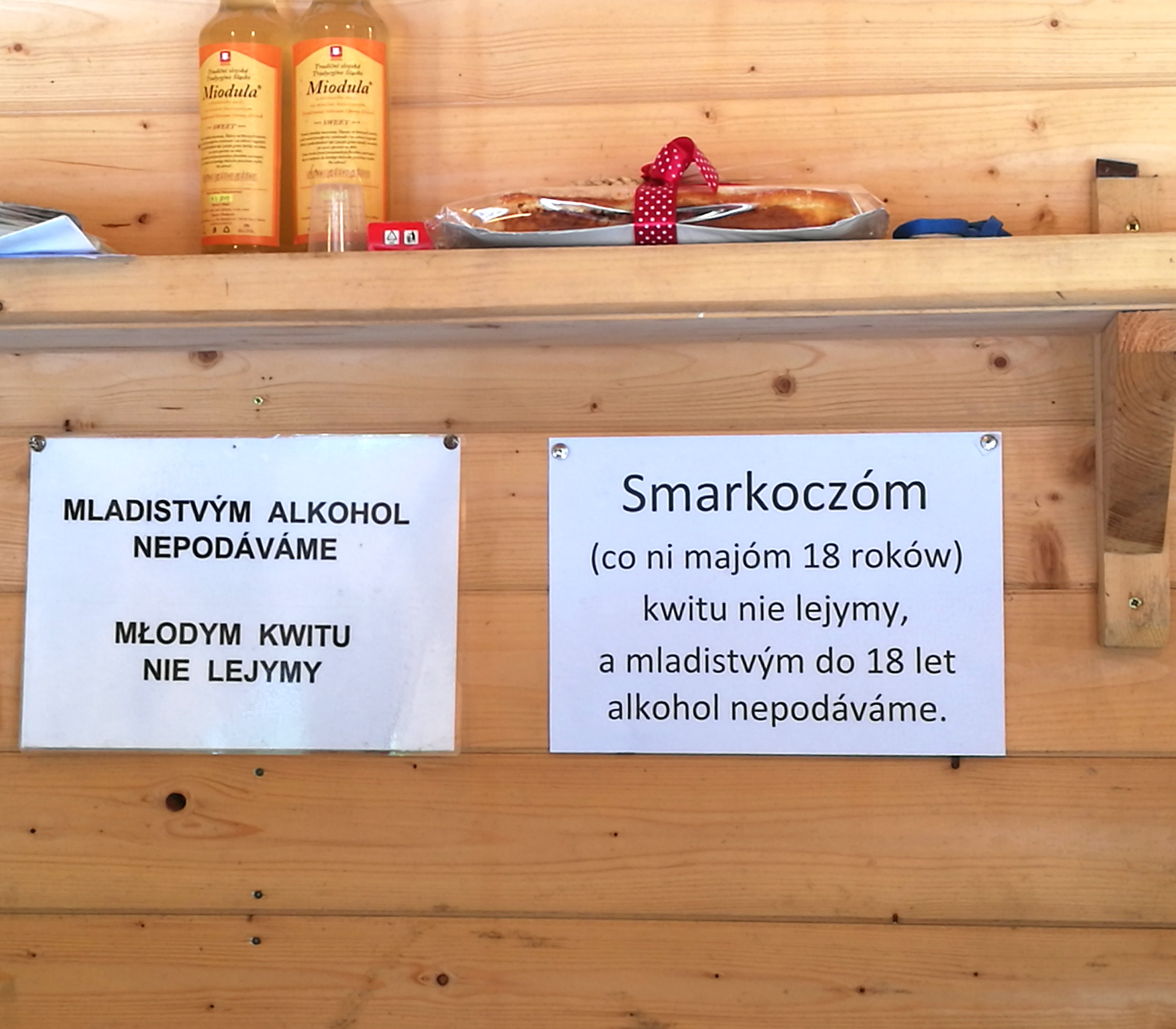
Bilingual sign written in Cieszyn Silesian and Czech at Gorolski Święto.

The native Slavic vocabulary of the Cieszyn Silesian dialect consists of some words shared with modern Czech and some words shared with modern Polish. It also contains words which has become obsolete in modern Polish but whose cognates are still used in Czech. Cieszyn Silesian has borrowed heavily from German, specifically the Silesian German dialects spoken in the area, and also contains some "Carpathianisms" of Romance, Albanian, Hungarian and East Slavic origin, which are mostly words relating to the pastoral lifestyle of shepherds in the highlands.

== Literature ==
The main standard languages used in Cieszyn Silesia are Czech and Polish; in the past, German and Latin were also used. However, several writers and poets wrote in the dialect, including Adolf Fierla, Paweł Kubisz, Jerzy Rucki, Władysław Młynek, Józef Ondrusz, Karol Piegza, Adam Wawrosz and Aniela Kupiec. Poets who wrote in Cieszyn Silesian generally regarded their work as part of the Polish literary tradition, rather than belonging to a new standard language, by contrast to Ondra Łysohorsky, who wrote in a Lachian literary standard of his own creation.

== Example text ==
The Lord's Prayer in the Cieszyn Silesian dialect, with Czech and Polish for comparison:

Cieszyn Silesian	Polish	Czech
Ojcze nasz, kjery żeś je w niebje, bóndź pośwjyncóne mjano Twoji. Przyńdź królestwo Twoje, bóndź wola Twoja, jako w niebje, tak też na źymji. Chlyb nasz każdodźienny dej nóm dźiśej. A odpuść nóm nasze winy, jako my odpuszczómy naszym winńikum. A nie wodź nas na pokuszeni, ale zbow nas od złego. Amen.	Ojcze nasz, który jesteś w niebie, święć się imię Twoje, przyjdź królestwo Twoje, bądź wola Twoja jako w niebie tak i na ziemi. Chleba naszego powszedniego daj nam dzisiaj. I odpuść nam nasze winy, jak i my odpuszczamy naszym winowajcom. I nie wódź nas na pokuszenie, ale nas zbaw ode Złego. Amen.	Otče náš, jenž jsi na nebesích, posvěť se jméno Tvé Přijď království Tvé. Buď vůle Tvá, jako v nebi, tak i na zemi. Chléb náš vezdejší dej nám dnes. A odpusť nám naše viny, jako i my odpouštíme naším viníkům a neuveď nás v pokušení, ale zbav nás od zlého. Amen.

== See also ==
- Tutejszy
