= Horní Líštná =

Coordinates: 49°41′35″N 18°42′14″E

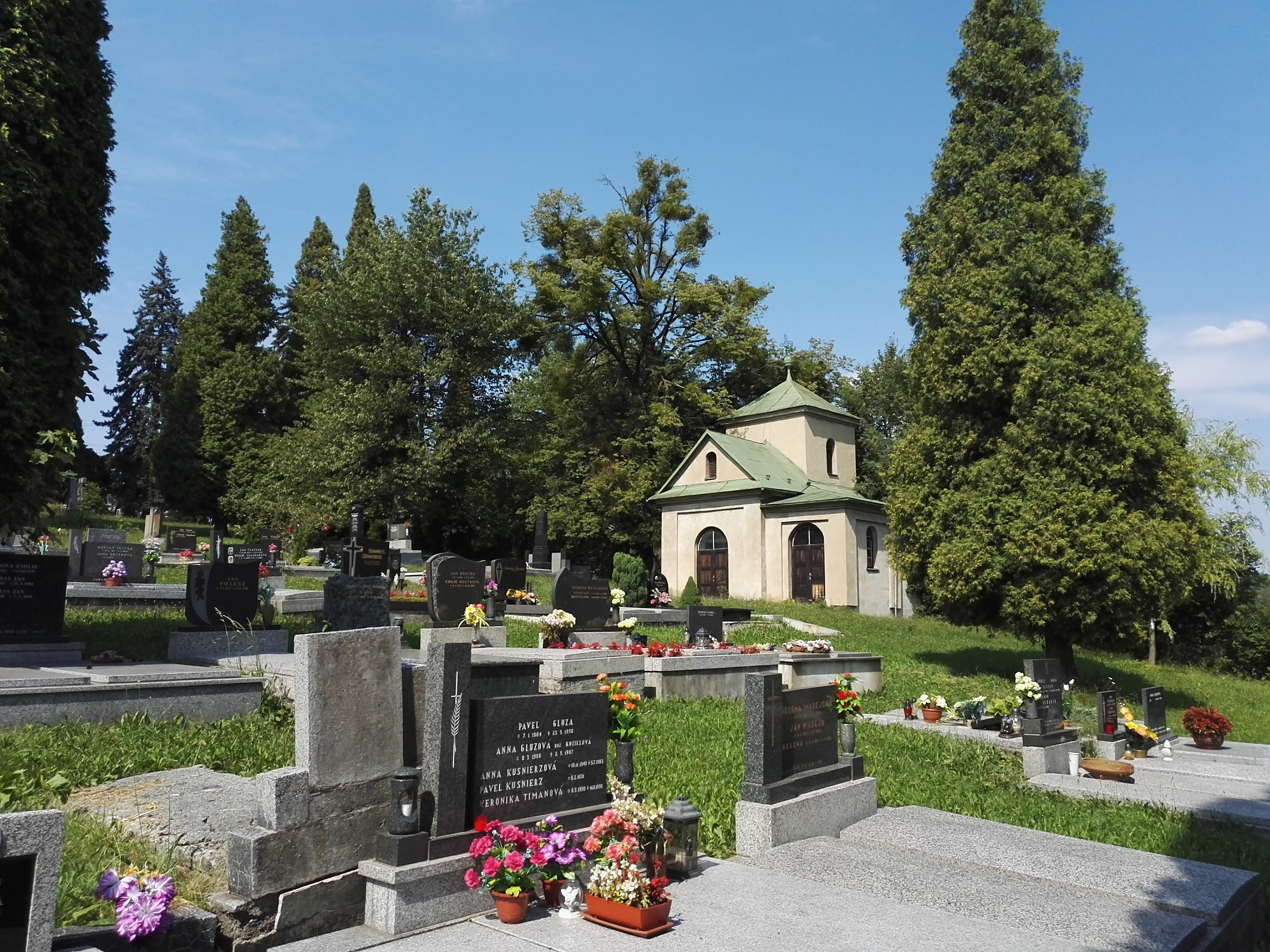
Lutheran cemetery in Horní Líštná

Horní Líštná (Polish: Leszna Górna, German: Ober Lischna) is a village in Frýdek-Místek District, Moravian-Silesian Region, Czech Republic. It was a separate municipality but became administratively a part of Třinec in 1960. It lies on the border with Poland, in the historical region of Cieszyn Silesia and has a population of 311 (1 January 2008).

Until the 1920 division of Cieszyn Silesia between Poland and Czechoslovakia it was a part of the village of Leszna Górna, which now lies in Poland.

== See also ==
- Dolní Líštná
- Leszna Górna
- Polish minority in the Czech Republic
- Zaolzie
