= Cieszyn Silesia =

Historical region in Central Europe

Cieszyn Silesia Těšínské Slezsko / Těšínsko (Czech) Śląsk Cieszyński (Polish) Těšín Silesia
- Historical region
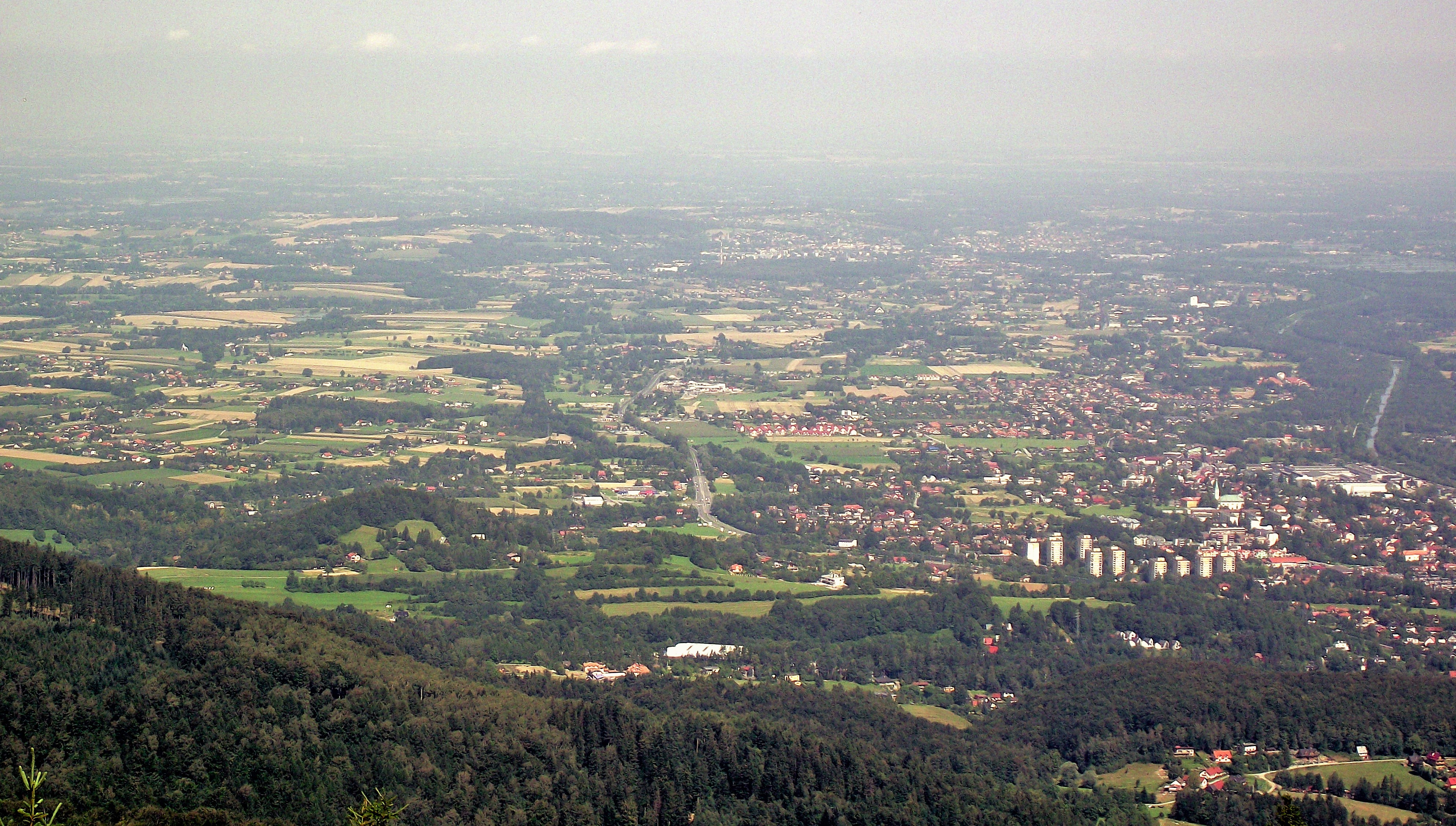
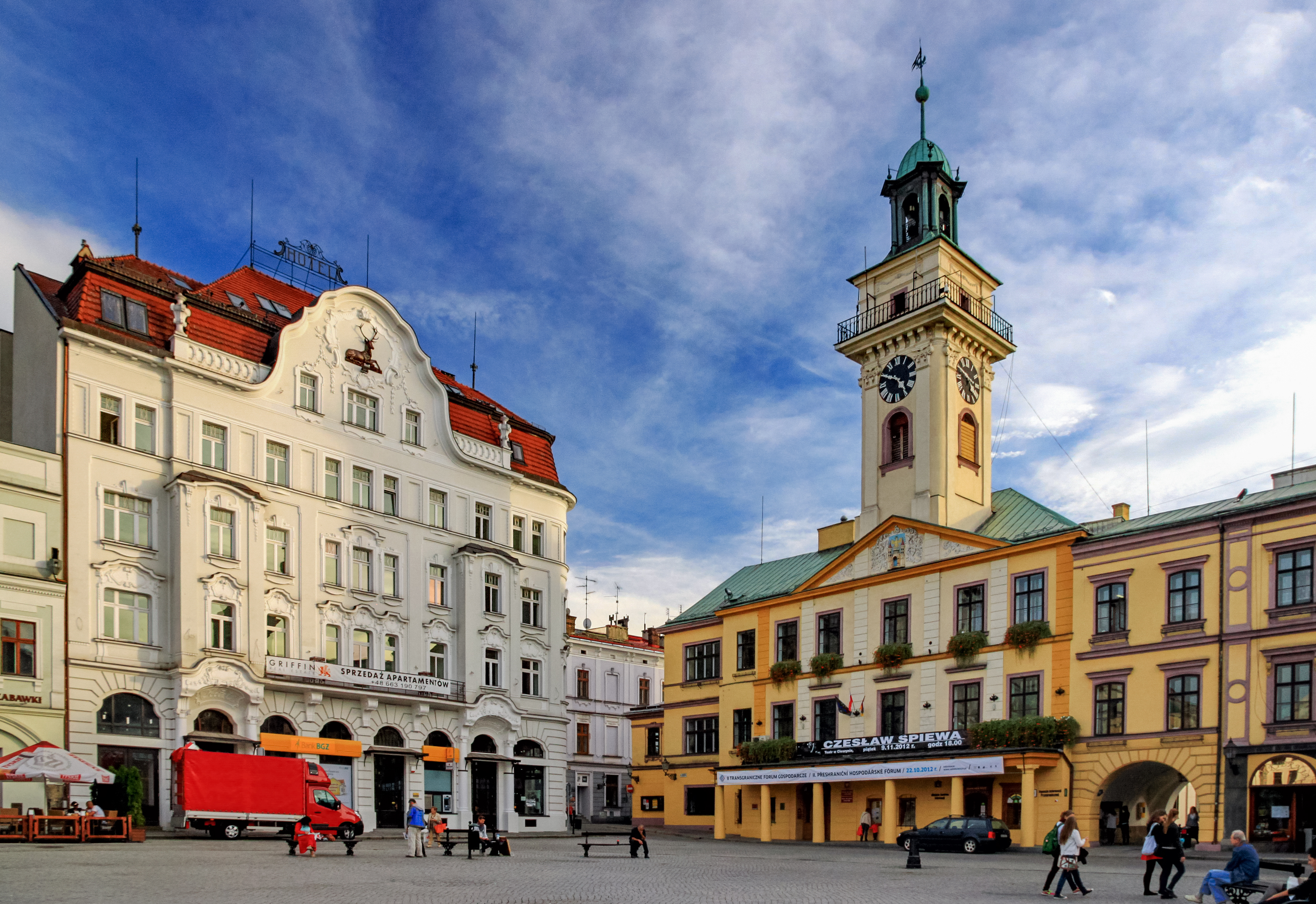
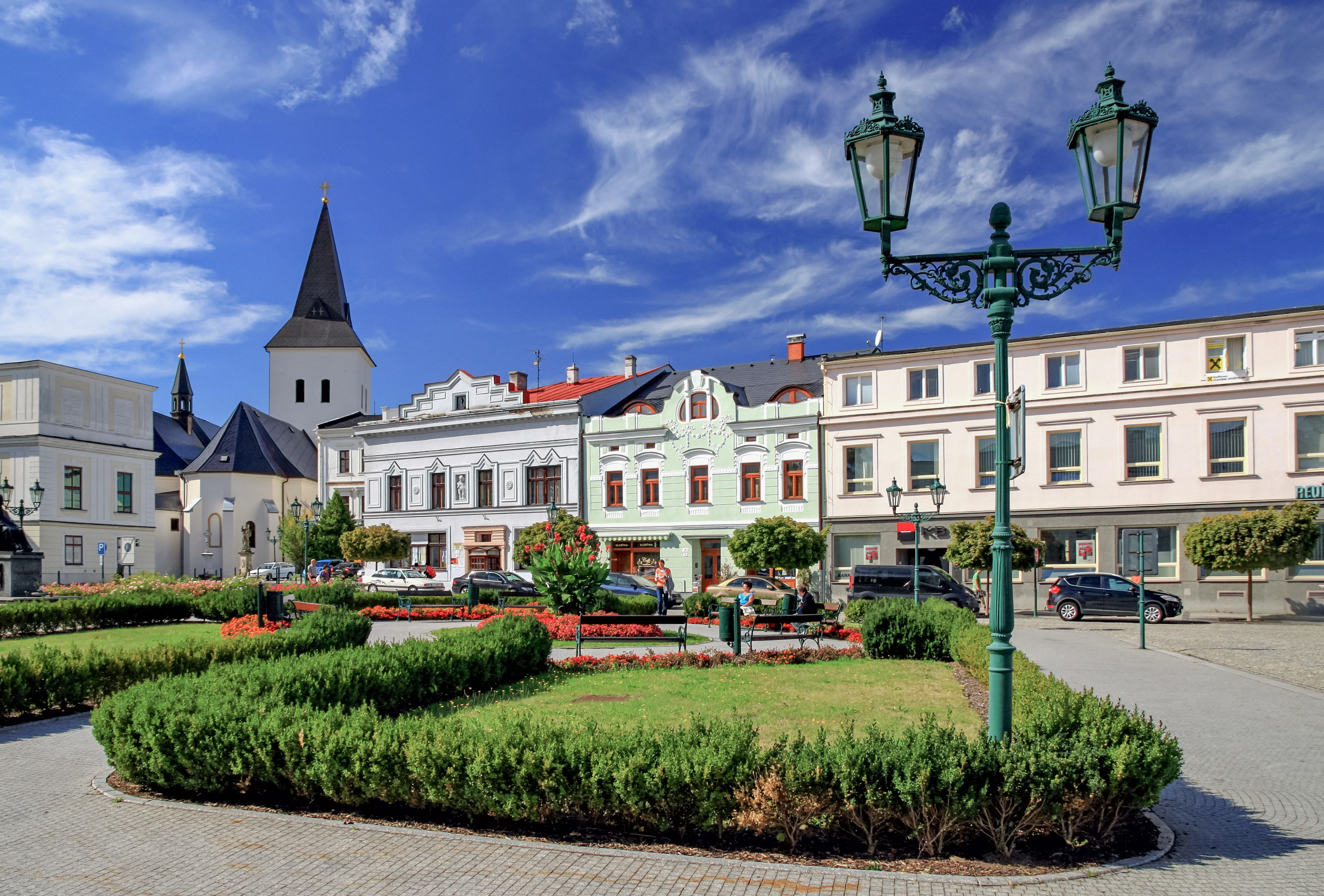
- From top, left to right: Cieszyn Silesian landscape seen from Wielka Czantoria; Cieszyn; Karviná

- Flag Coat of arms

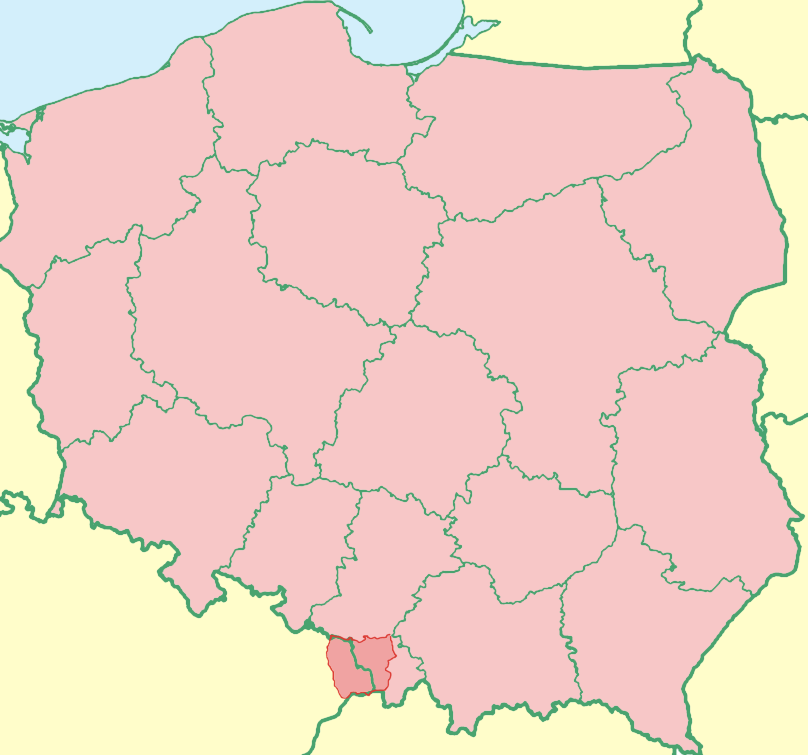
- Location of Cieszyn Silesia on the map of Poland

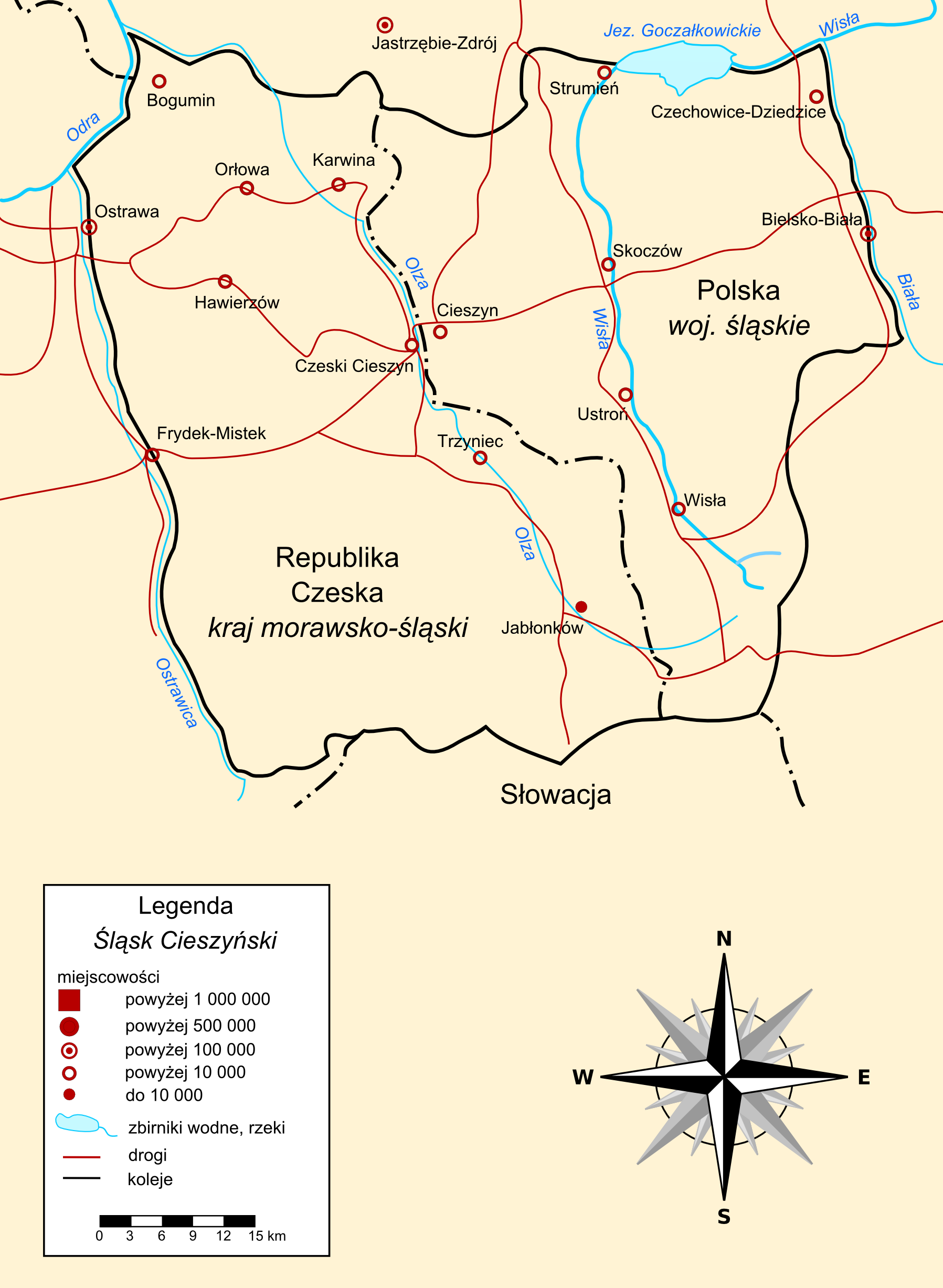
- Polish map of Cieszyn Silesia. The solid black line is the historical border of the region, and the broken black line is the international border.
- Coordinates: 49.749°N 18.626°E
- Country: Poland; Czech Republic
- Historical region: Upper Silesia
- Seat: Cieszyn

Area
  - Total: 2,280 km^{2} (880 sq mi)

Population
  - Total: 810,000
  - Density: 360/km^{2} (920/sq mi)
- Time zone: UTC+1 (CET)
  - Summer (DST): UTC+2 (CEST)

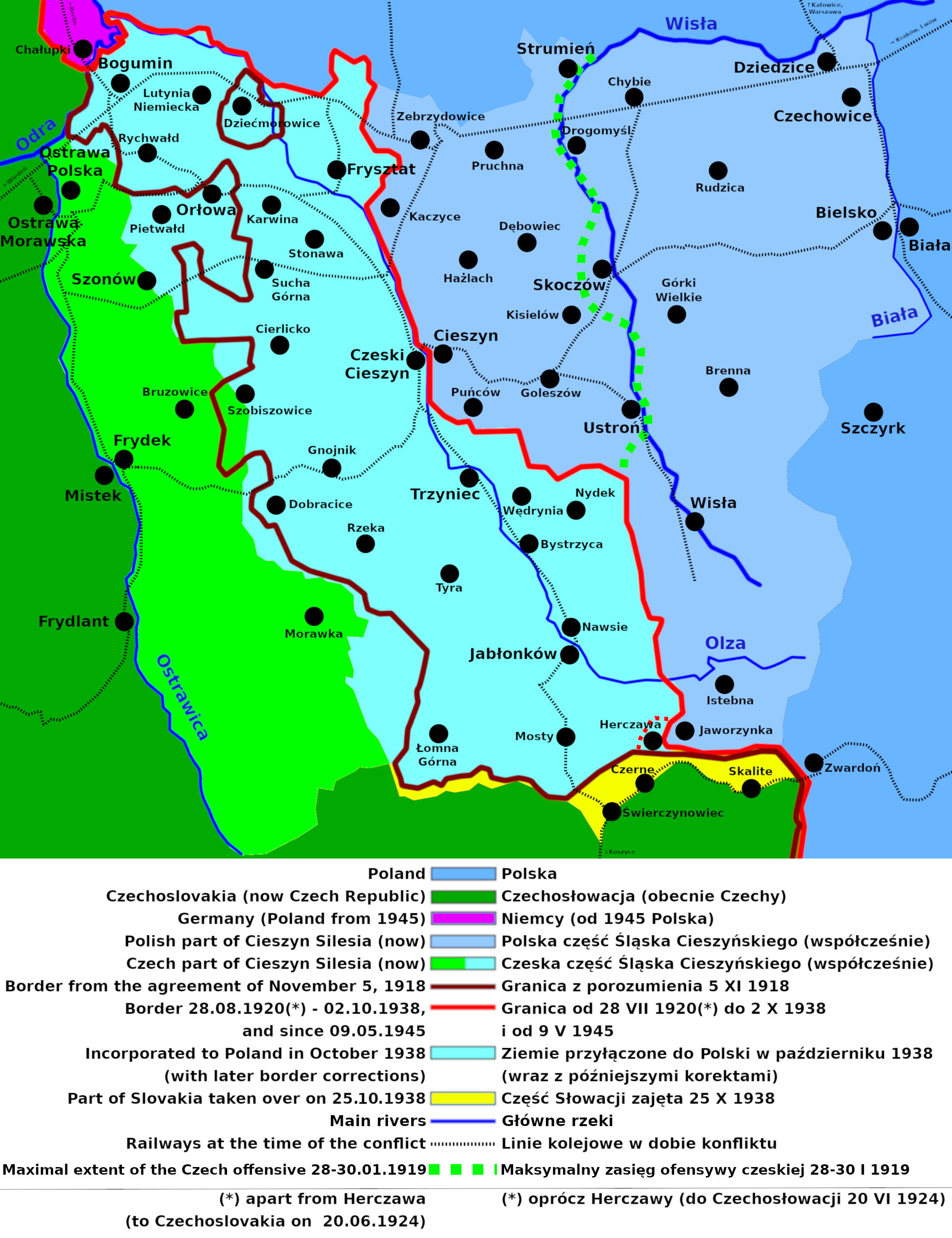
Map of Cieszyn Silesia and its Polish-Czech historical borders in 1918-1945

Cieszyn Silesia, Těšín Silesia or Teschen Silesia (Polish: Śląsk Cieszyński [ˈɕlɔ̃sk tɕɛˈʂɨj̃skʲi]; Czech: Těšínské Slezsko [ˈcɛʃiːnskɛː ˈslɛsko] or Těšínsko [ˈcɛʃiːnsko]; German: Teschener Schlesien or Olsagebiet) is a historical region in south-eastern Silesia, centered on the towns of Cieszyn and Český Těšín and bisected by the Olza River. Since 1920 it has been divided between Poland and Czechoslovakia, and later the Czech Republic. It covers an area of about 2,280 square kilometres (880 sq mi) and has about 810,000 inhabitants, of which 1,002 square kilometres (387 sq mi) (44%) is in Poland, while 1,280 square kilometres (494 sq mi) (56%) is in the Czech Republic.

The historical boundaries of the region are roughly the same as those of the former independent Duchy of Cieszyn. Currently, over half of Cieszyn Silesia forms one of the euroregions, the Cieszyn Silesia Euroregion, with the rest of it belonging to Euroregion Beskydy.

== Administrative division ==
From an administrative point of view, the Polish part of Cieszyn Silesia lies within the Silesian Voivodeship and comprises Cieszyn County, the western part of Bielsko County, and the western part of the town of Bielsko-Biała.

The Czech part lies within the Moravian-Silesian Region and comprises the Karviná District, the eastern part of the Frýdek-Místek District, and the eastern parts of the Ostrava-City District and of the city of Ostrava itself.

== History ==
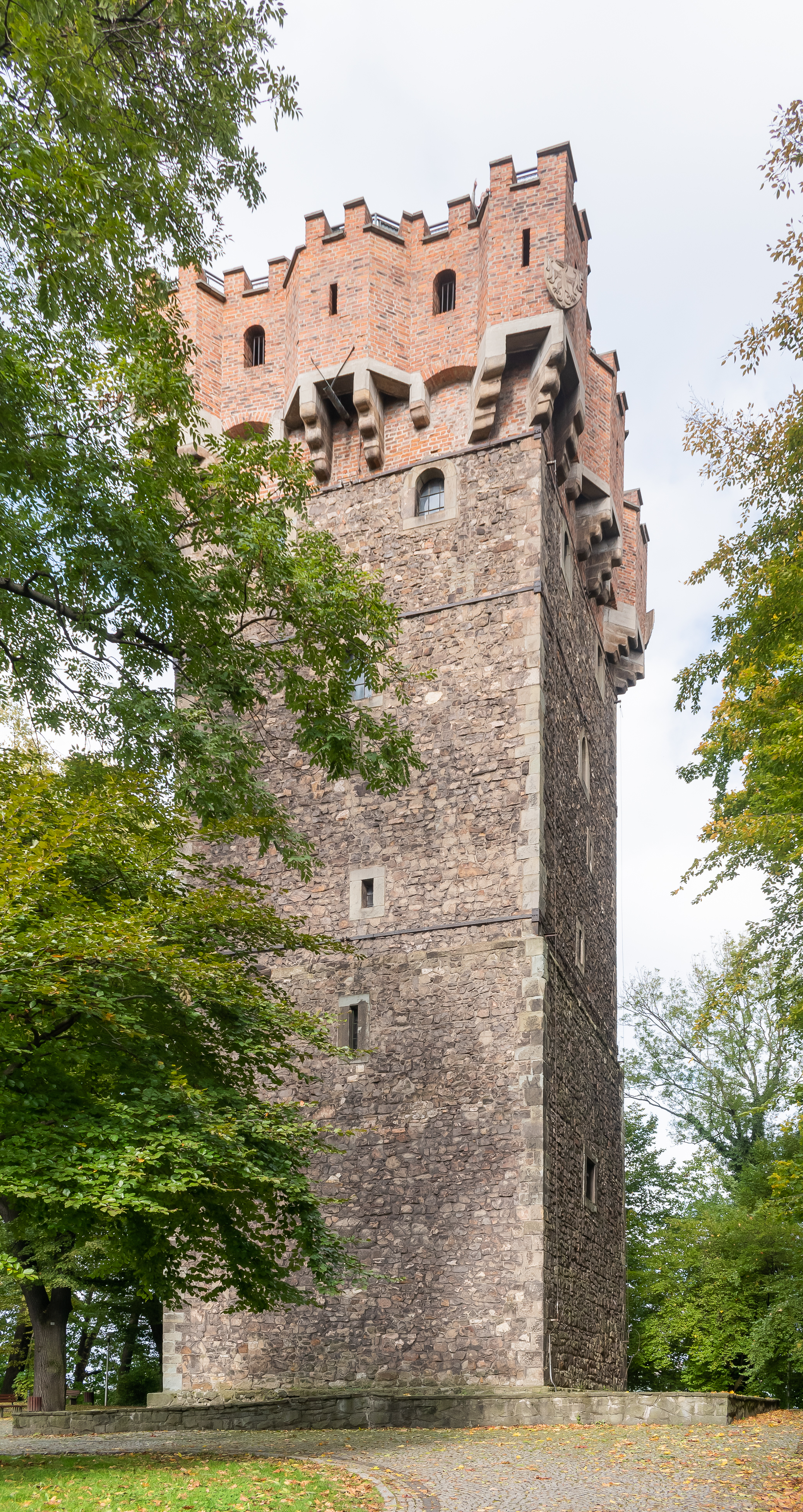
Piast tower in Cieszyn

Cieszyn Silesia covers the area of the former Duchy of Teschen, which existed from 1290 to 1918. Before 1290 the area constituted a castellany, which together with Castellany of Racibórz formed the Duchy of Racibórz in 1172. From 1202 it was a part of the united Duchy of Opole and Racibórz. From 1290 to 1653 the Duchy of Cieszyn/Teschen was ruled by the local branch of the Piast dynasty. In 1327 Casimir I, Duke of Cieszyn, swore homage to the Bohemian king John of Bohemia, and the duchy became an autonomous fiefdom of the Kingdom of Bohemia and later the Bohemian Crown. Piast rule continued until 1653 and the death of the last Piast descendant, Elizabeth Lucretia, Duchess of Cieszyn, after which it lapsed directly to the Kings of Bohemia, at that time from the Habsburg dynasty. From 1722, the dukes of Teschen hailed from the Dukes of Lorraine dynasty, from 1767 to 1822 from the Wettin dynasty, and from 1822 to 1918 from the Habsburg-Lorraine dynasty.

Cieszyn Silesia was cemented as a uniform historic, geopolitical, socio-cultural and economic entity during the period of Habsburg rule. It is distinct from the rest of Silesia because after the First Silesian War between the Habsburg Monarchy and Prussia it remained part of Austria, whereas most of Silesia became a part of Prussia.

After the end of World War I, both of the two newly created independent states of Poland and Czechoslovakia claimed the area. Czechoslovakia claimed the area partly on historic and ethnic grounds, but especially on economic and strategic grounds. The area was important for the Czechs, as the crucial railway line connecting Czech Silesia with Slovakia crossed the area (the Košice–Bohumín Railway, which was one of only two railroads that linked the Czech provinces to Slovakia at that time). The western area of Cieszyn Silesia is also very rich in coal. Many important coal mines, facilities and metallurgy factories are located there. The Polish side based its claim to the area on ethnic criteria: a majority of the area's population was Polish according to the last (1910) Austrian census.

Two local self-government councils, Polish and Czech, were created. Initially, both national councils claimed the whole of Cieszyn Silesia for themselves, the Polish Rada Narodowa Księstwa Cieszyńskiego in its declaration "Ludu śląski!" of 30 October 1918 and the Czech Národní výbor pro Slezsko in its declaration of 1 November 1918. On 31 October 1918, in the wake of World War I and the dissolution of Austria-Hungary, most of the area was taken over by local Polish authorities. The short-lived interim agreement of 2 November 1918 reflected the inability of the two national councils to come to final delimitation, and on 5 November 1918 the area was divided between Poland and Czechoslovakia by another interim agreement. In 1919 the councils were absorbed by the newly created and independent central governments in Prague and Warsaw.

The former was not satisfied with the situation and on 23 January 1919 invaded the area while both parties were engaged in much larger conflicts elsewhere, Poland in its war against the West Ukrainian National Republic and Czechoslovakia in the war with the Hungarian Soviet Republic over Upper Hungary. The impetus for the Czech invasion in 1919 was Poland's organising of elections to the Sejm (parliament) of Poland in the disputed area. The elections were to be held in the whole of Cieszyn Silesia. The Czechs claimed that the polls must not be held in the disputed area, as the delimitation was only interim and no sovereign rule should be executed there by any party. The Czech demand was rejected by the Poles and, following the rejection, Czechs decided to resolve the issue by force. Czech units led by Colonel Josef Šnejdárek and Polish units commanded by General Franciszek Latinik clashed after the swift Czech advance near Skoczów where a battle took place on 28–30 January. It was inconclusive, and before the reinforced Czech forces could resume the attack on the town, they were pressed by Entente to stop operations and a cease-fire was signed on 3 February.

In this tense climate it was decided that a plebiscite would be held in the area asking its people which country the territory should join. Plebiscite commissioners arrived there at the end of January 1920 and after analysing the situation declared a state of emergency in the territory on 19 May 1920. The situation in the territory remained very tense. Mutual intimidation, acts of terror, beatings and even killings affected the area. A plebiscite could not be held in this atmosphere. On 10 July both sides renounced the idea of plebiscite and entrusted the Conference of Ambassadors with the decision. Eventually 58.1% of the area of Cieszyn Silesia, along with 67.9% of the population, was taken over by Czechoslovakia on 28 July 1920 by decision of the Spa Conference. This decision divided a historically unified region, leaving a sizeable Polish minority in Czechoslovakia and in practice created Trans-Olza, the eastern part of the Czech part of Cieszyn Silesia delimited by the Olza River. The division of 1920 had an immediate impact on the life of the region. Many families were divided by the new border. Several municipalities were divided between the two states—Cieszyn (PL) / Český Těšín (CS), Leszna Górna (PL) / Horní Líštná (CS), and Marklowice Górne (PL) / Dolní Marklovice (CS), to name a few.

On 1 October 1938 Trans-Olza was annexed by Poland following the Munich Conference. On 1 September 1939 Zaolzie was annexed by Nazi Germany after it invaded Poland. During World War II Cieszyn Silesia was a part of Nazi Germany. Immediately after the war, its borders were returned to their 1920 state. Poland signed a treaty with Czechoslovakia in Warsaw on 13 June 1958 confirming the border as it had existed on 1 January 1938. The Czech part of Cieszyn Silesia continued to be part of Czechoslovakia until the latter's dissolution in 1993 and since then has been part of the Czech Republic.

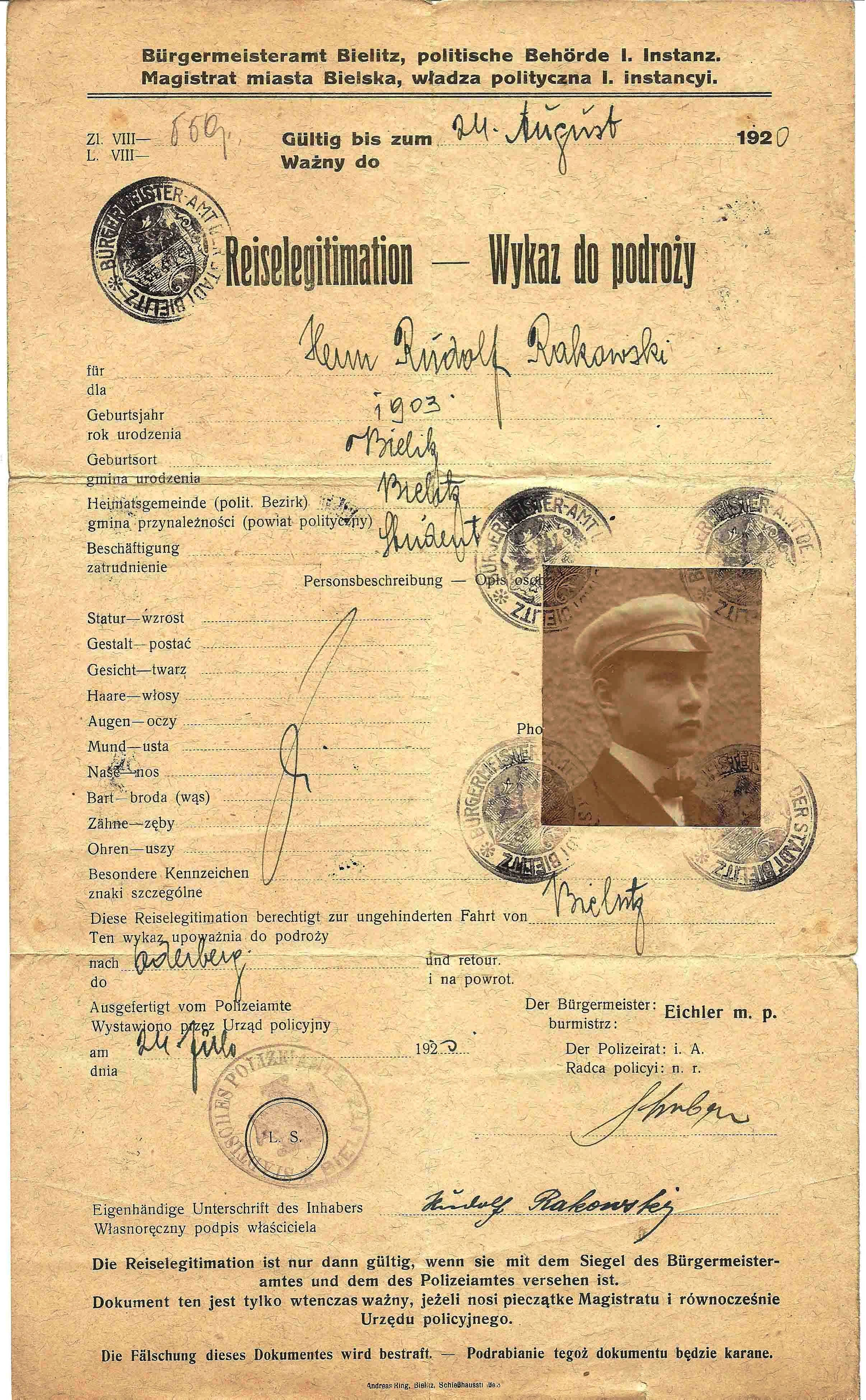
1920 German travel document from Bielitz before the Plebiscite.

== Geography ==
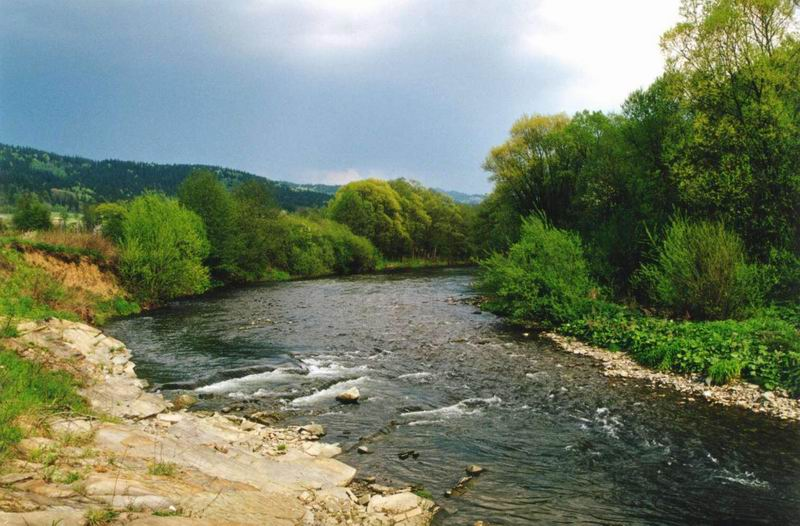
Olza River in Hrádek

The region is separated from the rest of Silesia (and Upper Silesia in particular) by the Vistula River (the part beginning in Strumień) and from the region of Lesser Poland by the Biała River and Barania Góra mountain, the highest peak of the Polish part of the region at 1,220 metres (4,000 ft). The highest peak of the region is Lysá hora (1,323 m; 4,341 ft) in the Czech part. The region also borders Slovakia, along the Polom mountain range and Jablunkov Pass at Mosty u Jablunkova, and Moravia across the rivers Ostravice and Oder. Geomorphologically, the area of Cieszyn Silesia is located in the Western Carpathians and extends into the mesoregions:

- Ostrava Basin
- Moravian-Silesian Foothills
- Moravian-Silesian Beskids
- Jablunkov Furrow
- Jablunkov Intermontane
- Silesian Beskids
- Silesian Foothills
- Oświęcim Basin

Major towns of the Polish part of the region include Cieszyn, Bielsko (western part of Bielsko-Biała), Czechowice-Dziedzice, Skoczów, Strumień, Ustroń and Wisła. The Czech part of the region includes the eastern part of Ostrava (called Slezská Ostrava), Bohumín, Český Těšín, Frýdek (the eastern part of Frýdek-Místek), Havířov, Karviná, Orlová and Třinec.

Historically Duchy of Teschen and therefore Cieszyn Silesia formed a part of Upper Silesia. After Silesian Wars in the 18th century it was separated from the rest of Silesia, which began the process of forming its own specificity, to the extent that some contemporary authors claim that Cieszyn Silesia and Upper Silesia are separate regions.

== Culture, language and religion ==
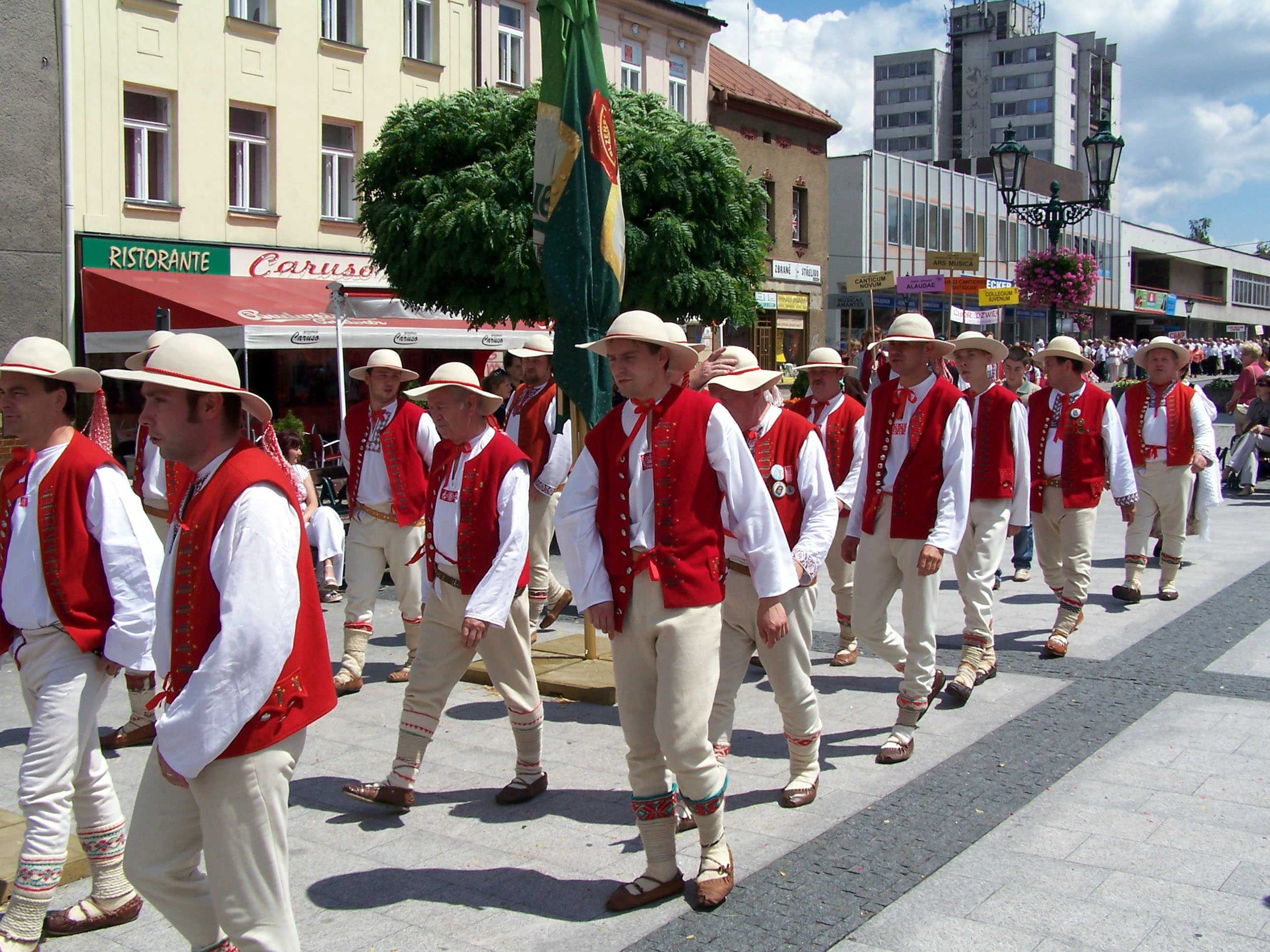
Gorol men's choir from Jablunkov/Jabłonków

Cieszyn Silesia as a region consolidated in the 19th century, which later became a discrete eastern part of Austrian Silesia, crownland of the Cisleithanian part of Austria-Hungary, which helped to form a distinct local identity based on language, religious and ethnic pluralism, and distinctiveness from other parts of Silesia.

The region was inhabited by several ethnic groups. Most numerous were Poles (historically called also Wasserpolaks), Czechs (mainly in the western part of the region), Germans (especially in the German language island of Bielsko-Biała) and Jews. The northern part, strongly industrialised and urbanised, is more densely populated than the southern part, which is more mountainous. The population density of Cieszyn Silesia is about 360/km^{2} (932/mi^{2}). The southern, mountainous part of the region is home to the Silesian Gorals, the indigenous people of the region. They have their own distinct culture which has influenced the culture of whole region.

Cieszyn Silesia is known for its religious pluralism. The most widespread religions are Roman Catholicism and Lutheranism. The region is distinct in large part because of its Protestantism, which has an influence on the whole region. Some of the municipalities with a Protestant majority include those in the vicinity of Skoczów and Wisła, the only town in Poland with a Protestant majority. Protestant influence is reflected in the regional saying in the Cieszyn Silesian dialect "Dzierży sie twardo jak lutersko wiara kole Cieszyna." (Stays strong like the Lutheran faith around Cieszyn.) Several towns, especially Bielsko, Cieszyn and Fryštát, in the past had a larger Jewish community, but the local Jews were almost completely annihilated by the Nazis during World War II and the local Germans were all deported to Germany or Austria after the war. Today, many other religious, mostly Christian, denominations are present in small numbers, including Jehovah's Witnesses, Seventh-day Adventists and Pentecostals whose movement within Poland originated in Cieszyn Silesia.

Cieszyn Silesia is also distinct for its dialect, the Cieszyn Silesian dialect, which differs from the other Silesian dialects spoken in Upper Silesia. It is a distinct dialect with predominantly Polish influences; Czech and German influences are also strong. The inhabitants of Cieszyn Silesia feel a strong regional (Cieszyn Silesian, Goral etc.) identity – locals will say they are (tu) stela (from here) – but the vast majority declare themselves to be of Polish or Czech nationality in their respective national censuses. This is somewhat different from the situation in Upper Silesia where a tendency toward autonomy still exists.

Local people however regard the Habsburg era rather fondly. The time of Maria Theresa and Franz Josef is viewed nostalgically as a time of justice, development, order and peace. This is in fact also partly rooted in a liberal and pluralistic attitude toward national and ethnic groups, liberal in comparison to other empires of that time, especially Prussia and the Russian Empire. Even in 2006 there were still portraits of Habsburg rulers on the wall in the assembly room of the Cieszyn local council.

The most widespread folk costume in the area used to be a Cieszyn folk costume associated with Cieszyn Vlachs.

== Historical ethnic structure ==
In 1900 Cieszyn Silesia had 361,015 inhabitants, of whom 218,869 were Poles (60.6%), 85,553 Czechs (23.7%) and 56,240 Germans (15.6%).

Ethnic structure of Cieszyn Silesia according to the 1900 census
County	Pop.	Poles	%	Czechs	%	Germans	%	Others	%
Gerichtsbezirk Bielitz (Bielsko)	28028	17323	61.8%	146	0.5%	10559	37.7%	0	0.0%
Gerichtsbezirk Skotschau (Skoczów)	32163	29747	92.5%	151	0.5%	2255	7.0%	10	0.0%
Gerichtsbezirk Schwarzwasser (Strumień)	14436	13364	92.6%	109	0.8%	963	6.7%	0	0.0%
Bielitz (Bielsko) District	74627	60434	81.0%	406	0.5%	13777	18.5%	10	0.0%
Gerichtsbezirk Teschen (Cieszyn)	60353	42380	70.2%	5320	8.8%	12583	20.8%	70	0.1%
Gerichtsbezirk Jablunkau (Jablunkov)	28481	27614	97.0%	86	0.3%	773	2.7%	8	0.0%
Teschen (Cieszyn) District	88834	69994	78.8%	5406	6.1%	13356	15.0%	78	0.1%
Gerichtsbezirk Friedek (Frýdek)	41725	1639	3.9%	39112	93.7%	971	2.3%	3	0.0%
Gerichtsbezirk Polnisch Ostrau (Ostrava)	40908	12112	29.6%	25840	63.2%	2955	7.2%	1	0.0%
Friedek (Frýdek) District	82633	13751	16.6%	64952	78.6%	3926	4.8%	4	0.0%
Gerichtsbezirk Oderberg (Bohumín)	27558	19182	69.6%	3342	12.1%	4943	17.9%	91	0.3%
Gerichtsbezirk Freistadt (Fryštát)	62412	52545	84.2%	6372	10.2%	3336	5.3%	159	0.3%
Freistadt (Fryštát) District	89970	71727	79.7%	9714	10.8%	8279	9.2%	250	0.3%
Bielitz (Bielsko) City	16065	2420	15.1%	94	0.6%	13540	84.3%	11	0.1%
Friedek (Frýdek) City	8886	543	6.1%	4981	56.1%	3362	37.8%	0	0.0%
Total Cieszyn Silesia	361015	218869	60.6%	85553	23.7%	56240	15.6%	353	0.1%
