= Jerzy Samuel Bandtkie =

Polish linguist, philologist, historian, bibliographer and lexicographer

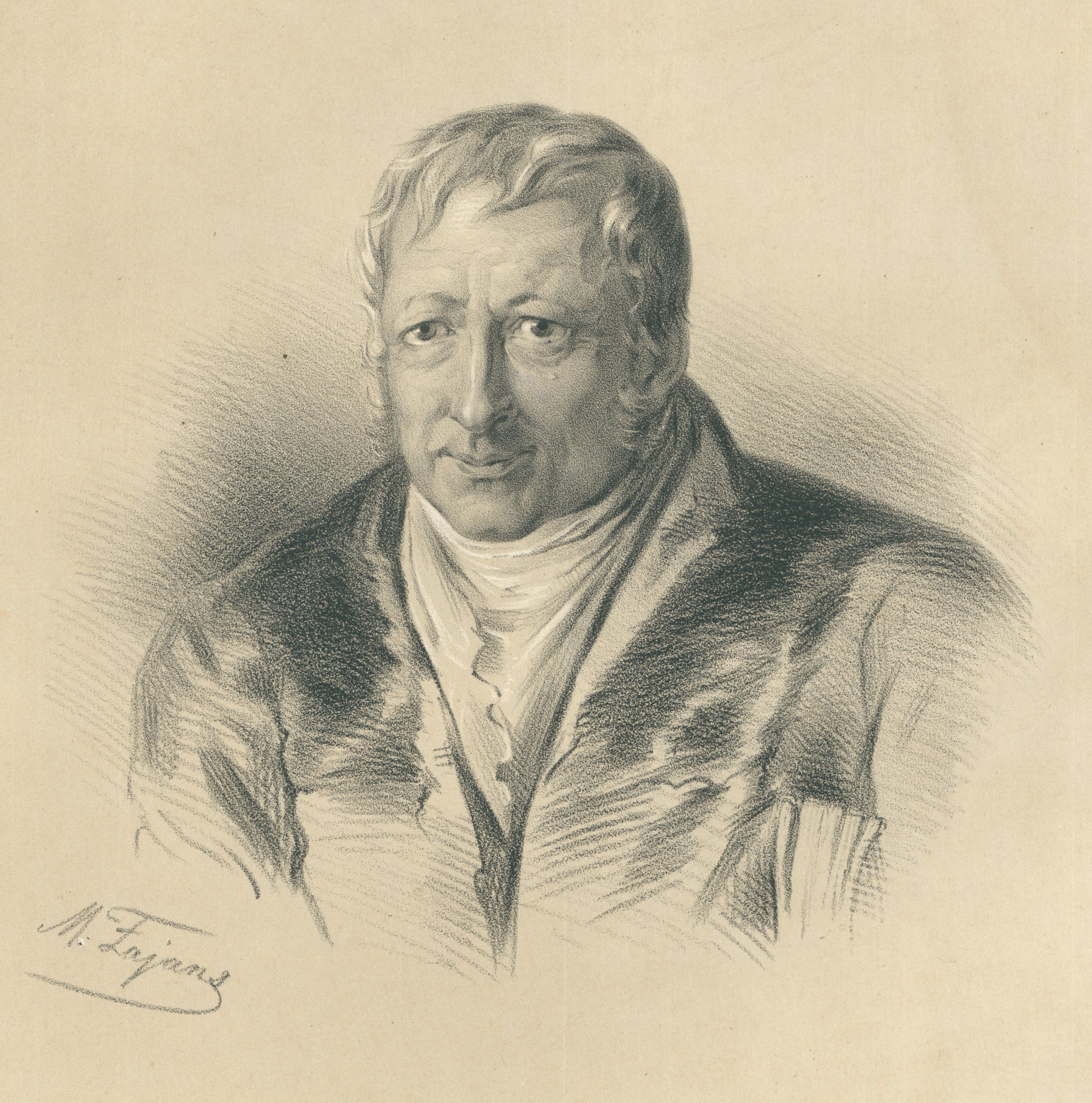
- Born: 24 November 1768; Lublin, Polish–Lithuanian Commonwealth (now in Poland)
- Died: 11 June 1835 (aged 66); Free City of Kraków (now in Poland)

Academic background
- Education: University of Halle; University of Jena

Jerzy Samuel Bandtkie (also spelled Bandtke; 24 November 1768 – 11 June 1835) was a Polish linguist, philologist, historian, bibliographer and lexicographer.

== Biography ==
Bandtkie was born to Jan Samuel Bandtkie, a German merchant, and Maria Noak. He was baptized on 5 December 1868 at Piaski. In 1779, he began attending St. Elizabeth Gymnasium in Wrocław. After obtainining his matura in 1787, he studied theology at the University of Halle for two years and at the University of Jena for one year; however, he was drawn to history and philology. He worked as a tutor for a pastor in Hermannsdorf, and later for Piotr Ożarowski's sons, from 1790 to 1798, when he returned to Wrocław. There, he became a substitute professor and teacher of the Polish language at St. Elizabeth Gymnasium. He became a professor for the Gymnasium's seventh class in 1803; the following year, in 1804, he became rector of Holy Spirit Gymnasium and librarian for the Church of St. Benedict.

On 4 September 1811, Bandtkie was appointed librarian and professor of bibliography at Jagiellonian University. As the University's librarian, he helped to modernize and reorganize its library, cataloging around 40,000 works and adding thousands more to the library's collection. He received an honoris causa doctorate from the University on 12 October 1811. Bandtkie gave the first lecture on numismatics in Poland at the University during the 1814–15 academic school year; from then until the 1816–17 academic year — and later in the 1831–32 academy year — he also served as dean, helping to contribute to the University's statues during his first term.

Bandtkie served as a senator of the Free City of Kraków on behalf of Jagiellonian University in 1820. He later served as the editor of various journals and periodicals, including Miscellanea Cracoviensia, Miscellanea Cracoviensia Nova, and Rozmaitości Naukowe. Bandtkie died on 11 June 1835 after a paralytic stroke, and was buried in Rakowice Cemetery.

Bandtkie was a member of the Warsaw Society of Friends of Learning, and a member of the Kraków Scientific Society from 1815. Besides his monographs, he wrote over 80 scientific articles, spanning the fields of history, linguistics, bibliography, archaeology, and folklore.
