= Wasserpolack =

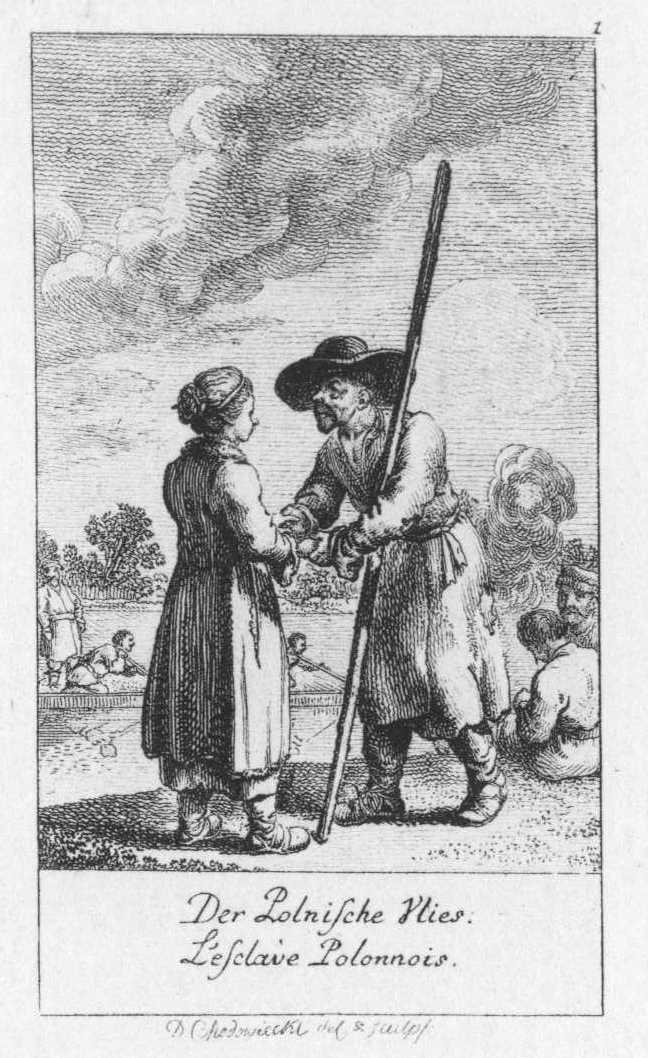
German: "Polish raftsman (flisak)", French: "Polish bondsman", a drawing by Daniel Chodowiecki

Wasserpolack (plural: Wasserpolacken, Wasserpolen) or Wasserpolak ("Water-Pole") was a pejorative term used for residents of Silesia, who spoke Silesian, which has been described as either one of the Slavic languages or a dialect of Polish., made by the Germans, similar to the term, "Hanys," Made by the Poles.

== Background ==
In Silesia, the Polish, German and Czech languages and cultures influenced one another for centuries. Since the 18th century, the German language became more important, starting to penetrate Slavic dialects. Many times families were mixed of different nations over centuries and they could not be treated as entirely Polish, German or Czech. They were identified as a regional community with a regional language.

The term Wasserpolack ("Water Pole") appears in the 17th century and was used for Poles living in Lower and Upper Silesia and also in other places where languages and nations were mixed over centuries. The term refers to the fact that the primary occupations of this population were associated with water: fishing and rafting.

In a 1884 ethnographic book Karl Burmann wrote that the language of Wasserpolacken is not Polish, but rather Wasserpolnisch (lit. Water-Polish), which Poles who don't speak German cannot understand, because in Wasserpolnisch often only Polish endings are attached to purely German words, e.g., fensterlatki for Fensterladen (window shutters), schuppenketki for Schuppenketten, etc.

Later its referent expanded to all Slavic people of Silesia and the Polish-German border areas.

== Use until World War II ==
Since the 19th century the name started to be used as a pejorative term. It was used in this sense e.g. by the historian Friedrich Christoph Förster who claimed that the poor "verschnappste Wasserpolacken" were evading the German army draft. During World War II the occupant German Nazis used this term to divide Poles by micronationalities.

== After World War II ==
Alongside German and Polish, many citizens of Opole/Oppeln before 1945 used a strongly German-influenced Silesian dialect (called Wasserpolnisch). Because of this, the post-war Polish state administration after the annexation of Silesia in 1945 did not initiate a general expulsion of all former inhabitants of Opole, as was done in Lower Silesia, for instance, where the population almost exclusively spoke the German language.

Because they were considered "autochthonous" (Polish), the Wasserpolak-speakers instead received the right to remain in their homeland after declaring themselves as Poles. Some German speakers took advantage of this decision, allowing them to remain in Oppeln, even when they considered themselves to be of German nationality. The city outlying areas currently contain the largest German and Upper Silesian minorities in Poland.

Since the 1950s the term became archaic, and it has fallen out of use by now, apart from polemical political texts.

== See also ==
- Opole § German minority
- Germans of Poland
