= Teschen District =

- political district
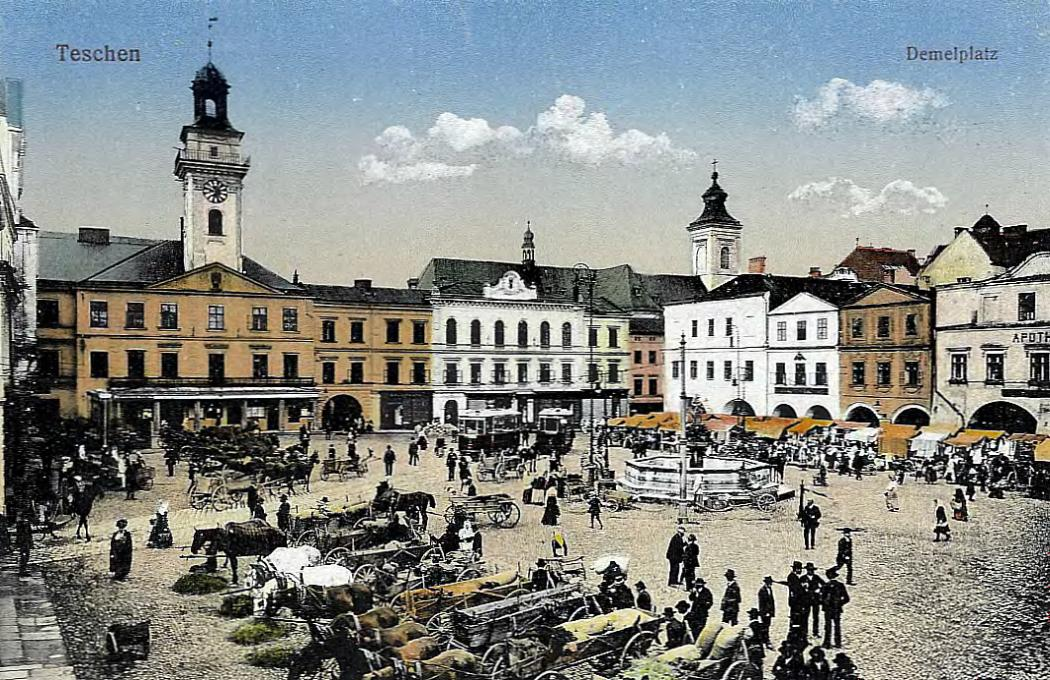
- Interactive map of Teschen District

Teschen District (German: Politischer Bezirk Teschen, Czech: Politický okres Těšín, Polish: Powiat polityczny Cieszyn) was a political district (equivalent to okres in the Czech Republic and powiat in Poland) in Austrian Silesia of the Austrian Empire (and since 1867 of Austria-Hungary) existing between 1850–1855 and 1868–1920. Its administrative center was the city of Teschen (now Cieszyn, Poland and Český Těšín, Czech Republic).

== History ==
Revolutions of 1848 in the Austrian Empire led to various social, legal and also administrative reforms. In late December 1849, Austrian Silesia was re-established and was initially subdivided into seven political districts, including one with the seat in Teschen. Political districts were additionally divided into legal districts (German: Gerichtsbezirk). Teschen political district consisted at the beginning of three legal districts: Teschen, Freistadt (Czech: Fryštát, Polish: Frysztat) and Jablunkau (Czech: Jablunkov, Polish: Jabłonków). In the era of Bach's neo-absolutism political districts were abolished and replaced by district offices (German: Bezirksamt) encompassing territories of the abolished legal districts. Political districts were re-established in 1868. Teschen political district was reshaped to include legal district of Friedek (before 1855 a separate political district) whereas Freistadt legal district was excluded to form the new Freistadt political district.

In 1880 Teschen political district was administratively divided into 101 municipalities (49 in Teschen legal district, 32 in Friedek, 20 in Jablunkau). Until 1890 this number grew to 102 (Žermanice were separated from Horní Bludovice) and on 1 January 1890 to 103 (separation of Lomná into Dolní Lomná and Horní Lomná). On 1 October 1901 Friedek legal district (with 33 municipalities) was excluded to form the re-established Friedek political district. After this Teschen political district had an area of 730 km^{2}, 70 municipalities (49 in Teschen legal district and 21 in Jablunkau).

According to the censuses conducted in 1880, 1890, 1900 and 1910 the population Teschen and Jablunkov legal districts were as follows:

	1880	1890	1900	1910
Teschen legal district	51,099	54,663	62,044	71,809
Polish-speaking	34,551 (69.1%)	39,258 (73.6%)	42,380 (70,2%)	47,982 (68,3%)
Czech-speaking	7,536 (15.1%)	4,912 (9,2%)	5,320 (8,8%)	6,033 (8,6%)
German-speaking	7,869 (15,8%)	9,150 (17.2%)	12,583 (20,9%)	16,133 (23%)
Jablunkau legal district	24,413	26,738	28,987	30,743
Polish-speaking	24,371 (97,5%)	25,607 (97.4%)	27,614 (97%)	26,165 (96,4%)
Czech-speaking	93 (0,4%)	63 (0.2%)	86 (0.3%)	171 (0,6%)
German-speaking	538 (2,1%)	622 (2,4%)	773 (2,7%)	912 (3%)

Traditionally the territory of those two legal districts was inhabited by Cieszyn Vlachs in the north and Silesian Gorals in the south, speaking Cieszyn Silesian and Jablunkov dialects. The results of those censuses and factors shaping national identity of the local population became a perennial subject of the political squabbles in the region. Additionally in terms of religion in 1910 the population with permanent residence consisted of Roman Catholics (56,924 or 55.5%), Protestants (42,738 or 41.7%), Jews (2,689 or 2,6%) and 201 others.

After World War I and fall of Austria-Hungary the region of Cieszyn Silesia including the territory of Teschen political district became disputed land between Czechoslovakia and Poland. This led to Polish–Czechoslovak War and the division of the region and district on 28 July 1920, by a decision of the Spa Conference. The part of Teschen district that was found within Czechoslovakia was superseded by Český Těšín District whereas the other part found in Poland was replaced by Cieszyn County, that was enlarged by municipalities of Freistadt and Bielitz districts.

== Municipal division ==
As of 1910:

Jablunkau legal district (Gerichtsbezirk Jablunkau)

1. Bistrzitz
2. Boconowitz
3. Bukowetz
4. Grudek
5. Istebna
6. Jablunkau (town)
7. Jaworzinka
8. Karpentna
9. Koniakau
10. Koszarzisk
11. Lischbitz
12. Unter Lomna
13. Ober Lomna
14. Millikau
15. Mosty
16. Nawsi
17. Niedek
18. Oldrzychowitz
19. Piosek
20. Tyra
21. Wendrin

Teschen legal district (Gerichtsbezirk Teschen)

1. Bażanowitz
2. Nieder Bludowitz
3. Bobrek
4. Brzezuwka
5. Nieder Dattin
6. Dobratitz
7. Nieder Domaslowitz
8. Ober Domaslowitz
9. Dzingelau
10. Kameral Ellgoth
11. Grodischcz
12. Gumna
13. Gutty
14. Haslach
15. Hnojnik
16. Kojkowitz
17. Konskau
18. Kotzobendz
19. Krasna
20. Nieder Lischna
21. Ober Lischna
22. Mistrzowitz
23. Mönichhof
24. Mosty
25. Niebory
26. Ogrodzon
27. Pastwisk
28. Pogwisdau
29. Punzau
30. Roppitz
31. Rzeka
32. Schibitz
33. Schöbischowitz
34. Schumbarg
35. Smilowitz
36. Stanislowitz
37. Teschen (town)
38. Nieder Tieritzko
39. Ober Tierlitzko
40. Nieder Toschonowitz
41. Ober Toschonowitz
42. Trzanowitz
43. Trzynietz
44. Trzytiesch
45. Wielopoli
46. Zamarsk
47. Nieder Zukau
48. Ober Zukau
49. Zywotitz
