= Lomna =

Lomná or Łomna may refer to:

- Lomná, Námestovo District, a municipality and village in Slovakia
- Lomná (river), a tributary of the Olza, Czech Republic
- Dolní Lomná, a municipality and village in the Czech Republic
- Horní Lomná, a municipality and village in the Czech Republic
- Łomna, Lesser Poland Voivodeship, a village in southern Poland
- Łomna, Gmina Czosnów, Nowy Dwór County, a village in Masovian Voivodeship, Poland
- Łomna, Sokołów County, a village in Masovian Voivodeship, Poland
- Łomna, Subcarpathian Voivodeship, a village in south-eastern Poland
