= Silesian Gorals =

Silesian Gorals Górale śląscy
Regions with significant populations
- Poland and Czech Republic: Cieszyn Silesia

Languages
- Jablunkov subdialect, Cieszyn Silesian dialect, Polish, Czech

Religion
- Roman Catholic, Lutheran (Wisła)

Related ethnic groups
- Gorals and Silesians

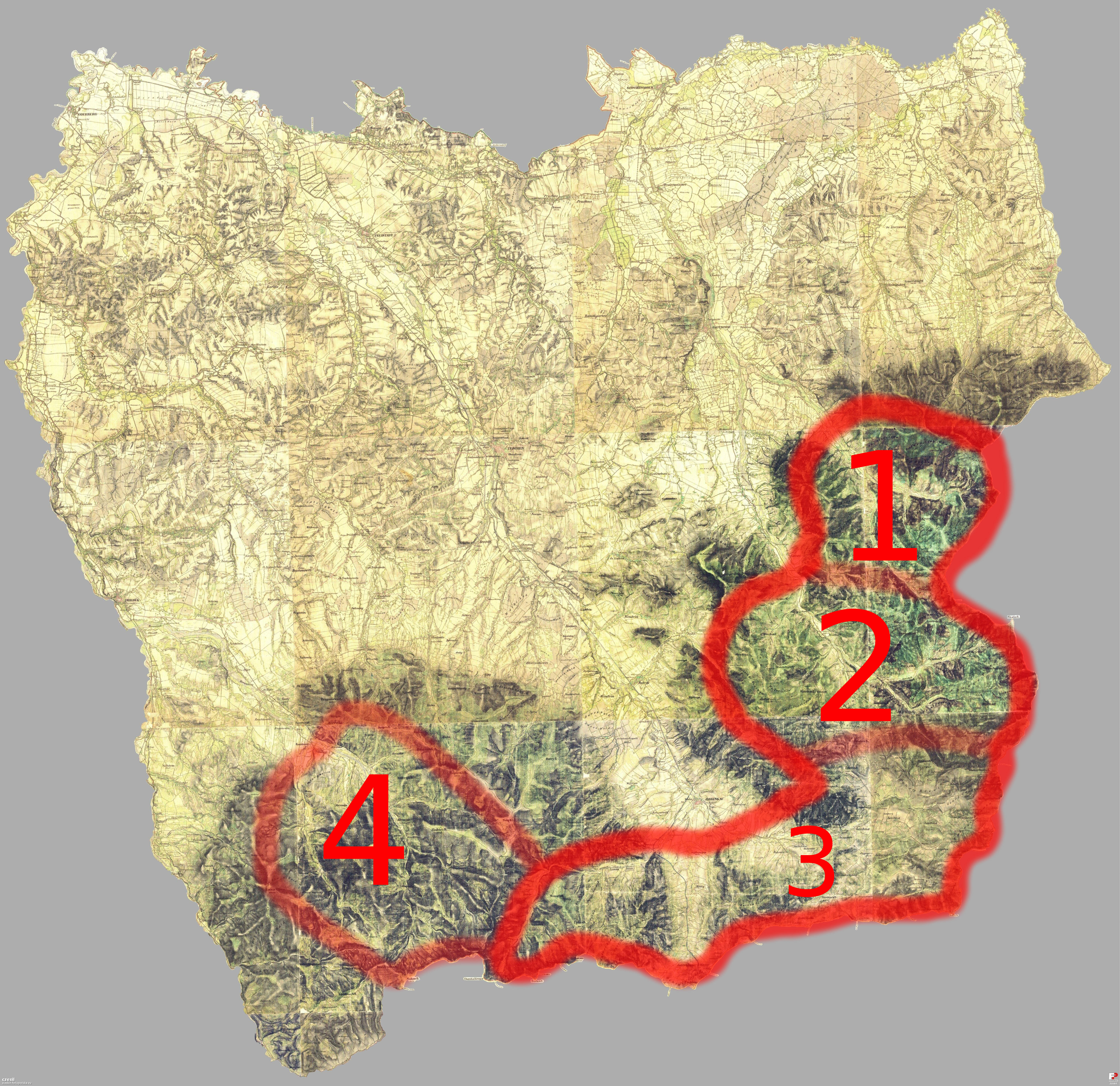
Silesian Gorals within Cieszyn Silesia: Brenna (1), Wisła (2), Jablunkov (3), Morávka (4)

Silesian Gorals (Note: Polish: Górale śląscy; Czech: Slezští Goralé; Cieszyn Silesian: Gorole; lit. 'highlanders' – from the Polish word góra 'mountain') are a subgroup of the Gorals living in the Silesian Beskids and Moravian-Silesian Beskids within the historical region of Cieszyn Silesia. They are one of the four major ethnographic groups of Cieszyn Silesia.

== History ==
Vlach colonization of the Silesian Beskids began in the late 15th century, roughly around the time when Brenna was first mentioned in 1490. It peaked in the following two centuries. The group shares many cultural traits with other Gorals of the Western Carpathians, stemming from a common way of living from shepherding in mountainous pastures, but they are also characterised by various different cultural and spiritual elements like dialect, beliefs, customs, costume, etc.

Wincenty Pol in his survey of Gorals in the middle of the 19th century subdivided Silesian Gorals into four groups:

- Breniacy – in Brenna.
- Wiślanie – in Wisła.
- Jabłonkowianie (Jablunkov Gorals) – in mountain villages around Jablunkov (Polish: Jabłonków) (Note: Important to note is that the town was inhabited by a different ethnographic group, called Jacki) including Koniaków, Jaworzynka, Istebna, (Note: Koniaków, Jaworzynka and Istebna are now a part of Poland.) Bukovec (Bukowiec), Mosty, Písek (Piosek), Dolní, and Horní Lomná (Łomna Dolna i Górna). (Note: Villages now part of the Czech Republic.)
- Morawianie (Moravians) – in the villages of Krásná, Morávka and Pražmo. Their dialect is transitional between the Polish and Czech language (see also: Moravians and Lach dialects).

Gorolski Święto is an annual international culture and folklore festival held in Jablunkov, aimed at presenting the folklore of the local Gorals.

== Gallery ==
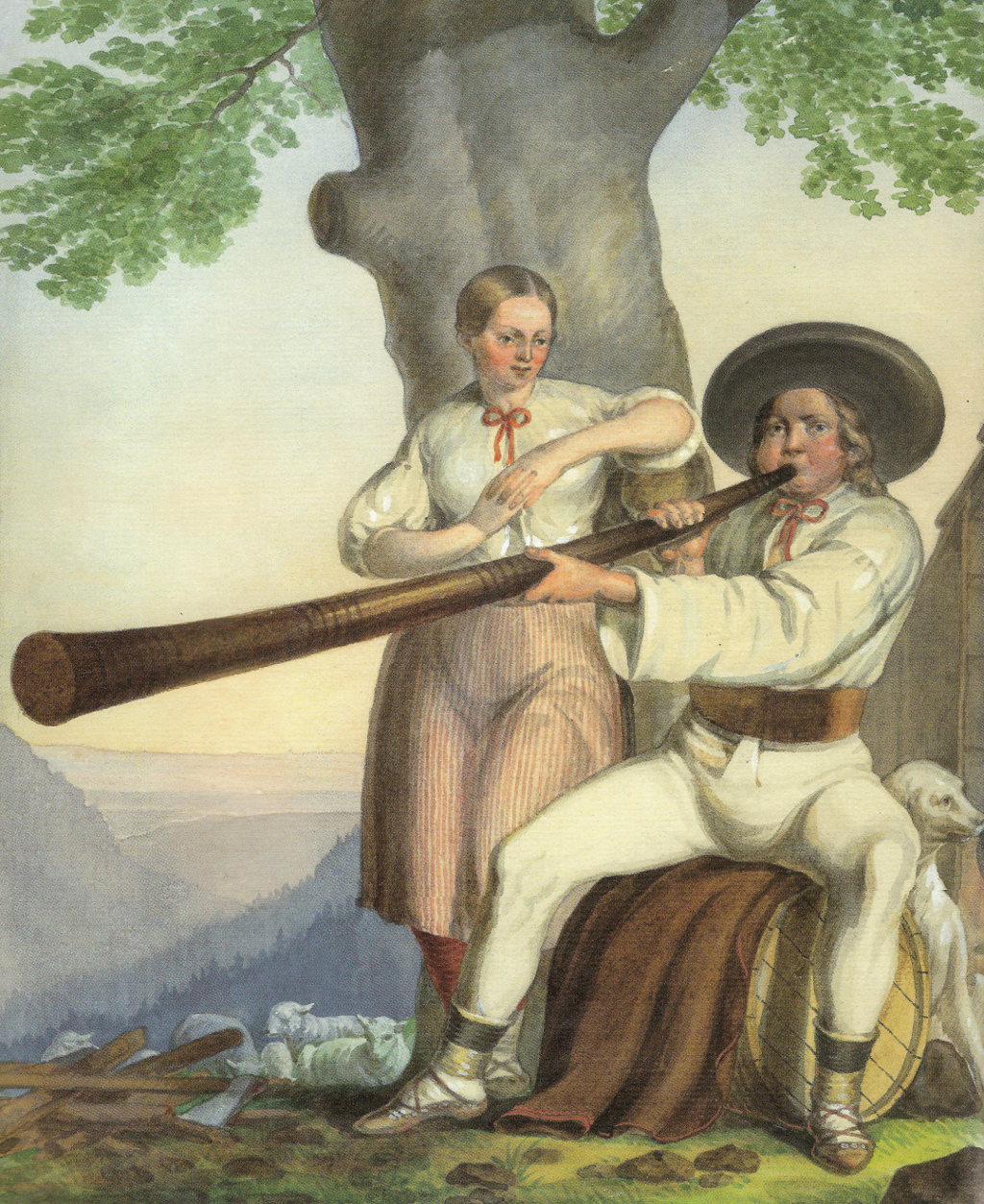
Henryk Jastrzembski: Gorals in Istebna (1846)

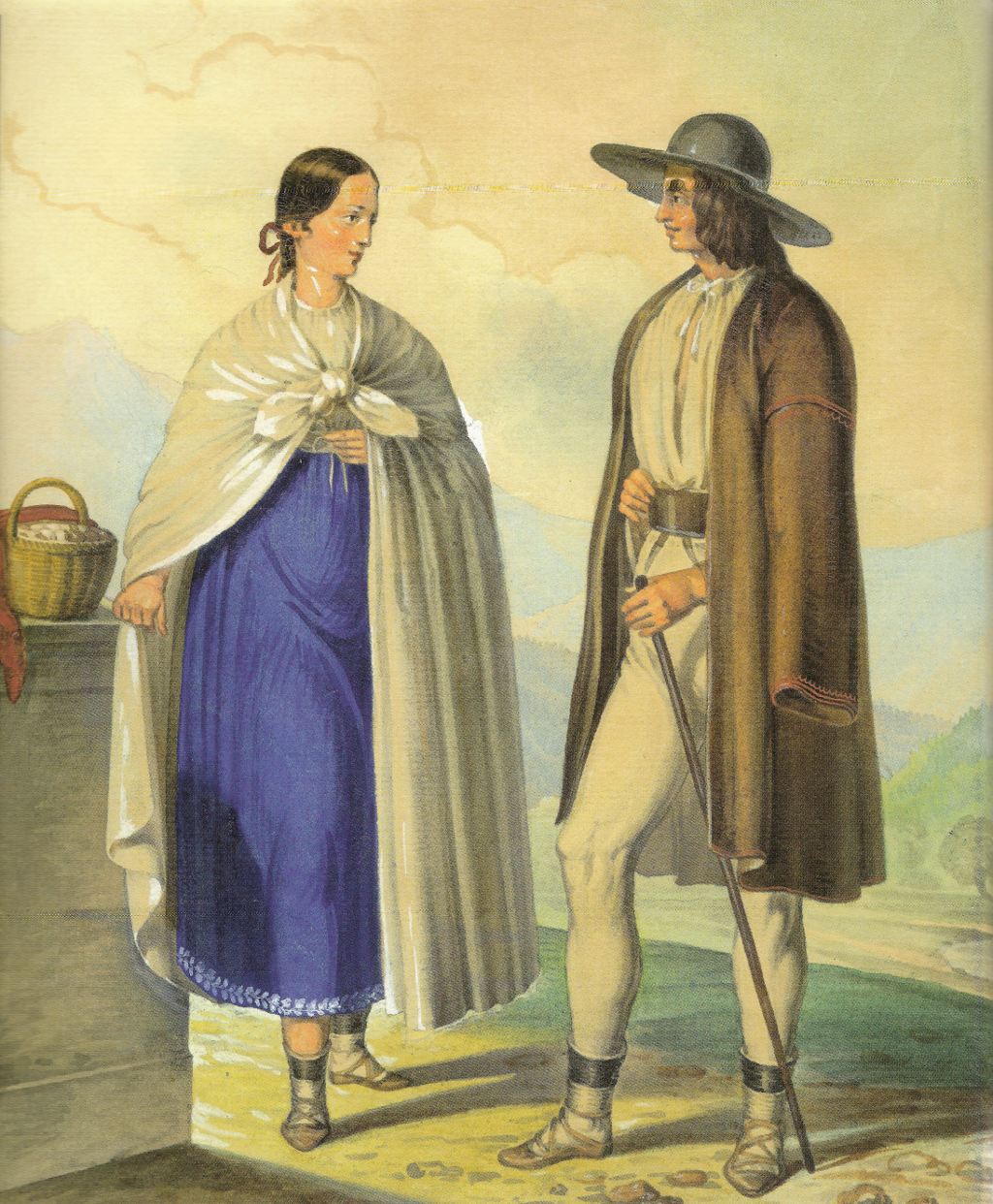
Henryk Jastrzembski: Gorals in Brenna (1848)

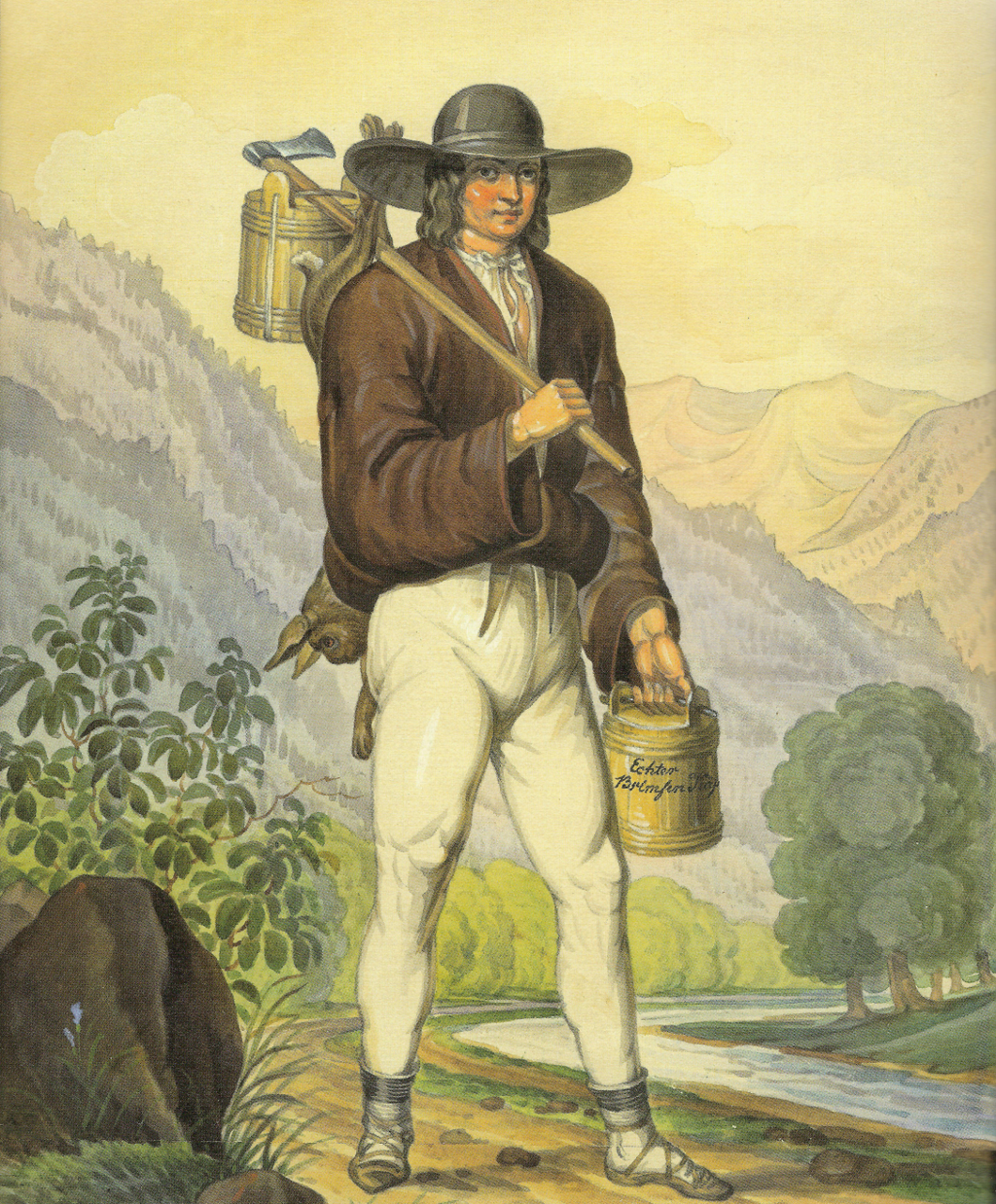
Henryk Jastrzemski: A Goral in Wisła (1848)

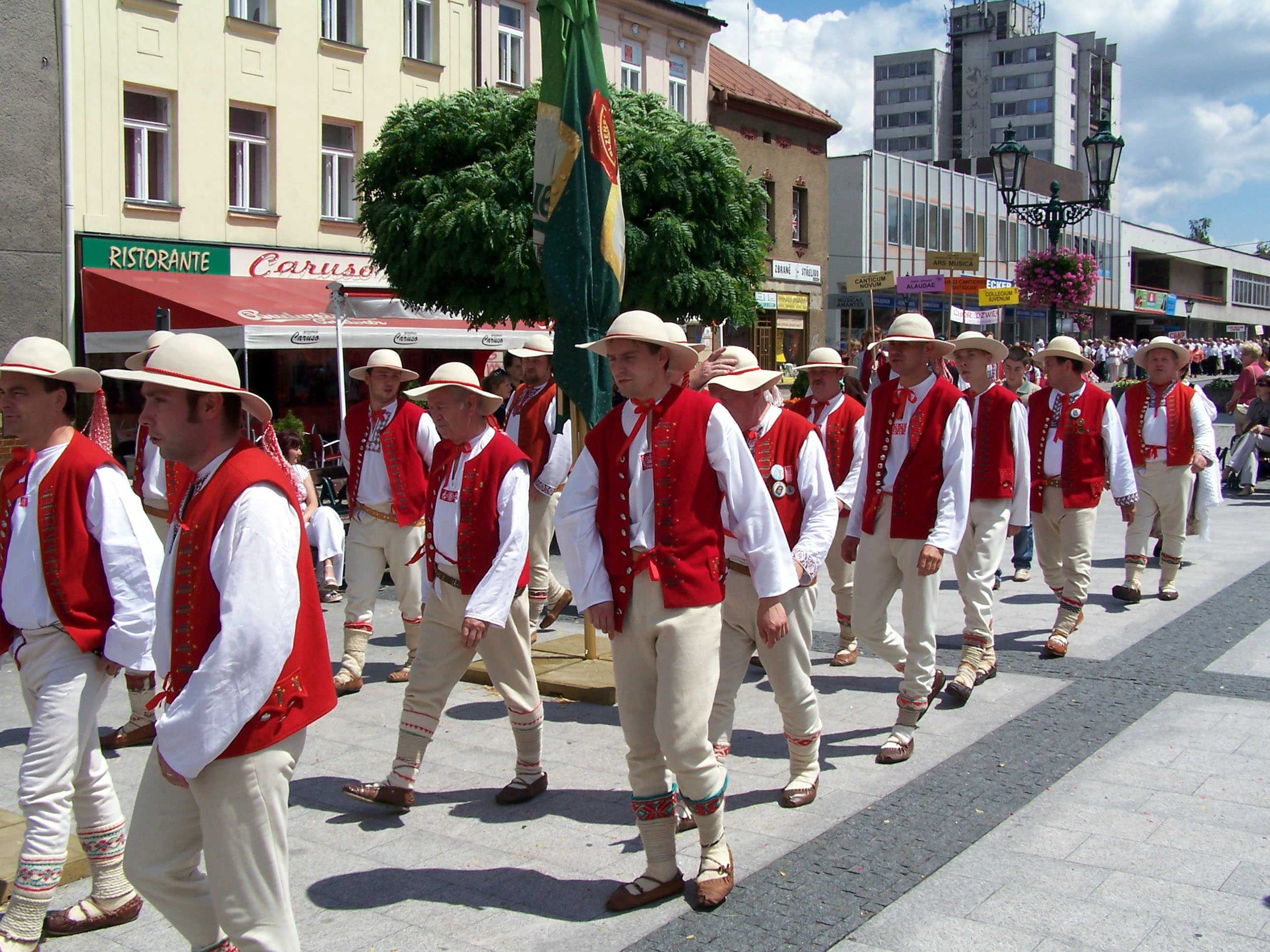
Gorol men's choir from Jablunkov during a parade of PZKO (2007)

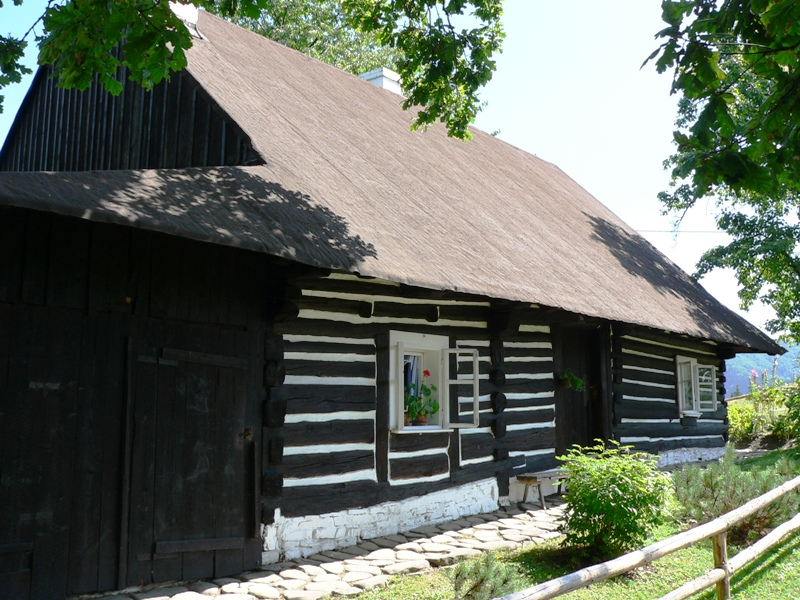
Traditional Gorol wooden house (drzewiónka) in Silesian Beskids

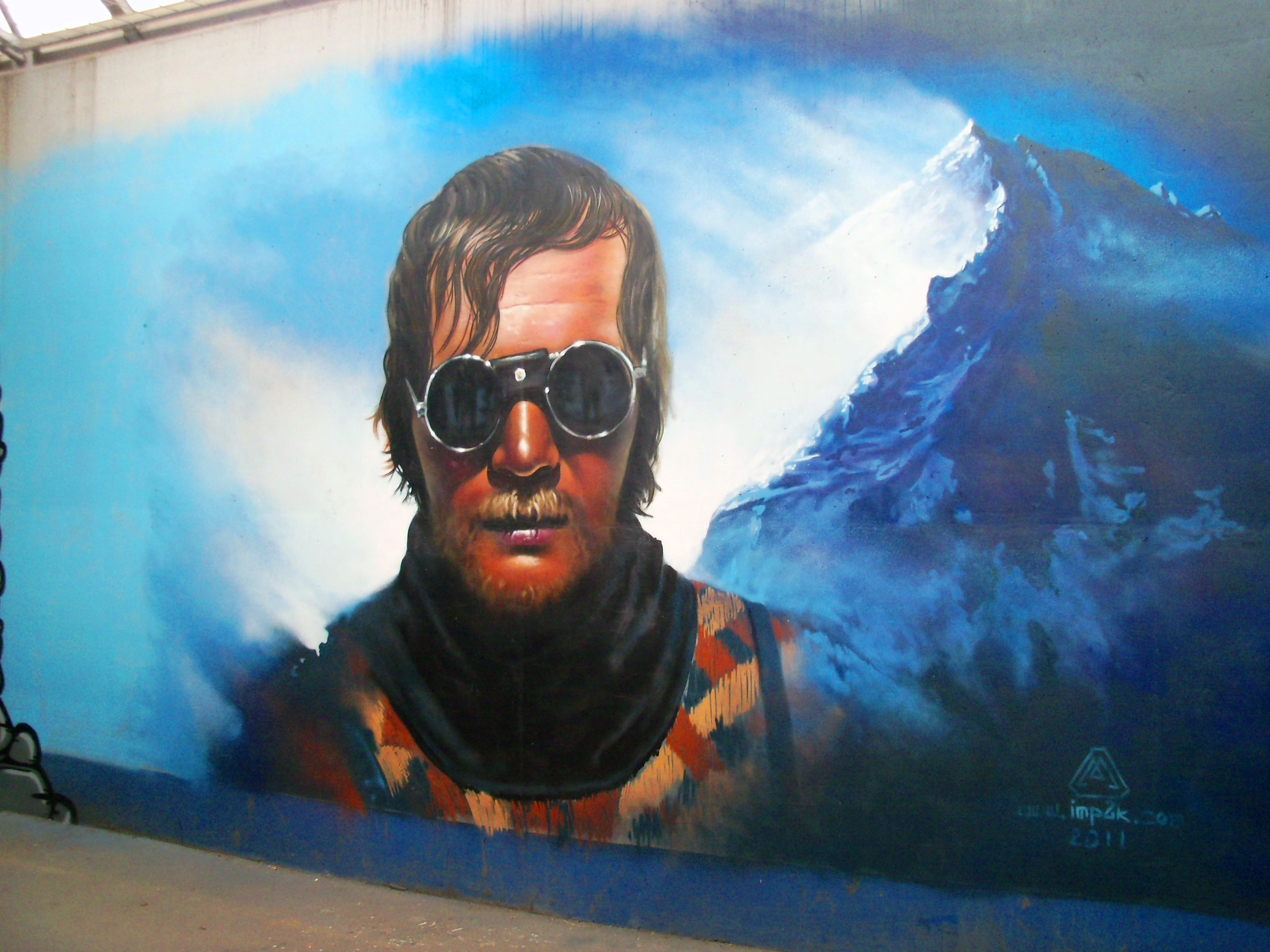
Jerzy Kukuczka mural in Katowice. Kukuczka was an ethnic Silesian Goral.

== See also ==
- Silesia
