= Order of Saint Elisabeth =

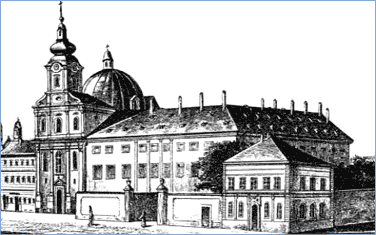
Convent in Linz, 19th century

The Order of the Sisters of St Elizabeth (Elisabethinae, Ordo Elisabethinarum, Sorores Hospitalariae S. Elisabethae, OSE) is a Catholic Church Order founded by Apollonia Radermecher (1571–1626) in Aachen in 1622. The order was called after Saint Elisabeth of Hungary (also of Thuringia).

The Sisters of St. Elizabeth have a tradition of caring for the sick and so they have founded a lot of hospitals especially in Central Europe. In 1910s, Mother Pulcheria Wilhelm, superior general of the foundation in Klagenfurt, Austria, promoted the establishment of the sisters in North America.

The convents and hospitals were founded in these places:

- Aachen, 1622
- Düren, 1650
- Luxembourg, 1671
- Graz, 1690
- Vienna, 1709
- Klagenfurt, 1710
- Prague, 1719
- Wrocław, 1736
- Linz, 1745
- Kadaň, 1748
- Straubing, 1749
- Munich, 1750
- Cieszyn, 1753
- Brno, 1754
- Bratislava, 1758
- Budapest, 1785
- Neuburg an der Donau, 1840
- Jablunkov, 1850
- Münsterberg, 1863
- Humboldt, Saskatchewan, 1911
