= Gorolski Święto =

Czech and Polish folklore festival

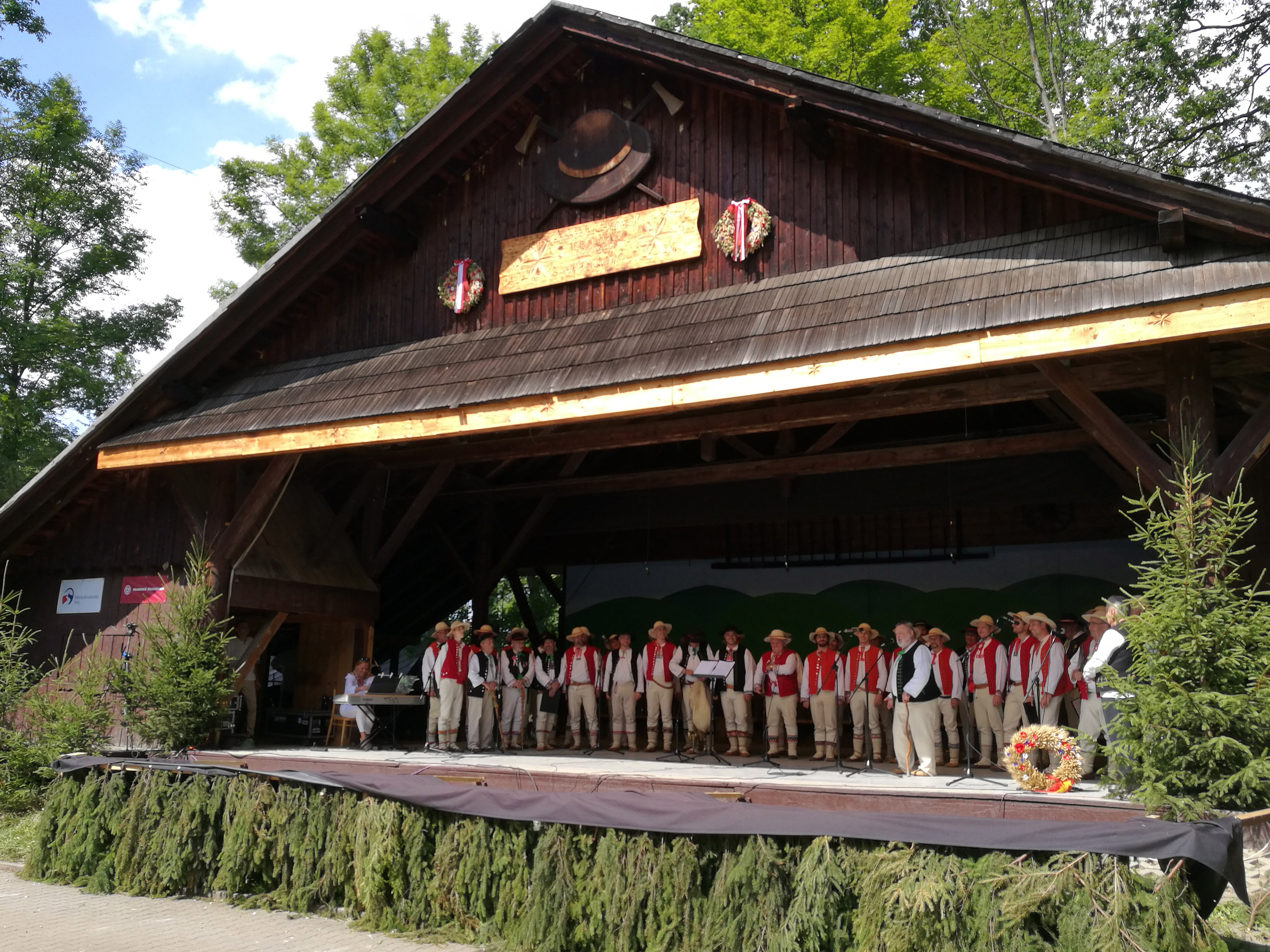
Goral men's choir during the Gorolski Święto in 2019

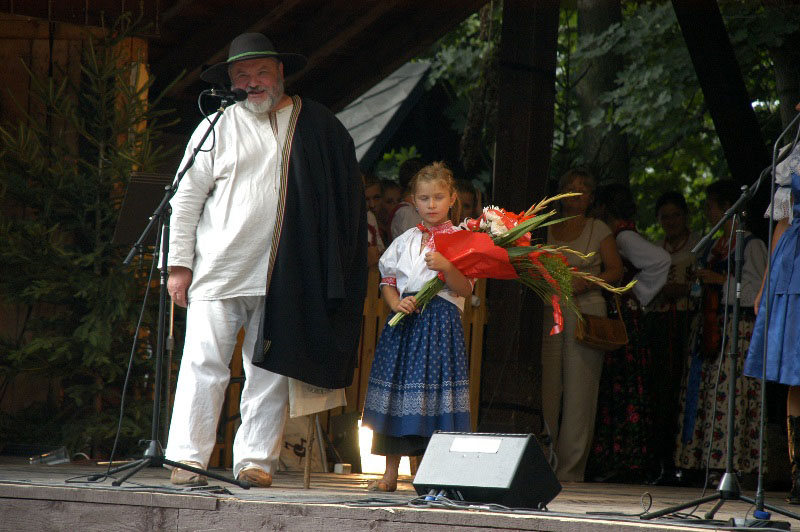
Tadeusz Filipczyk (Filip) during Gorolski Święto in 2007

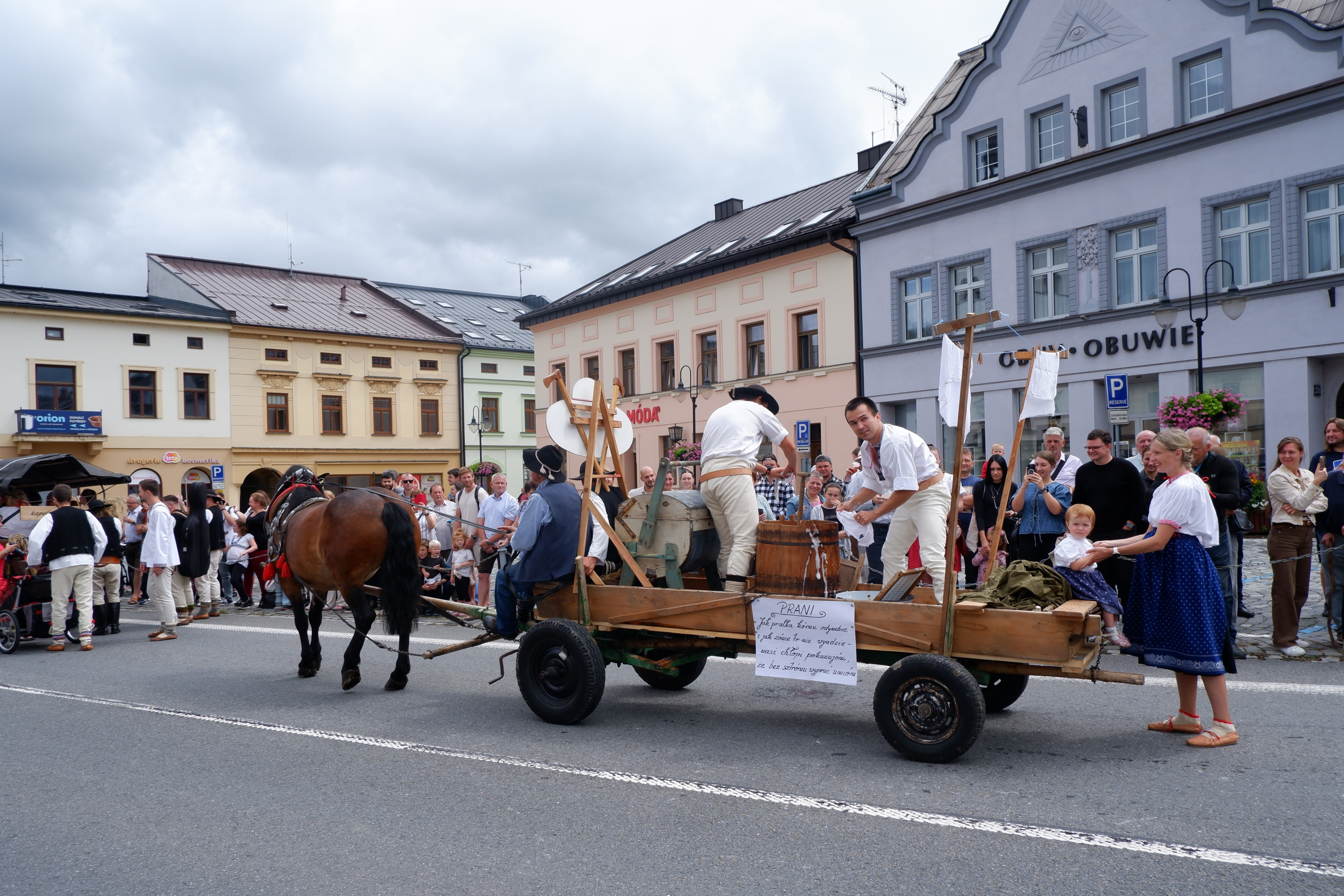
Parade through the streets of Jablunkov in 2025

Gorolski Święto (literally Goral's Festival; Silesian: Festiwal Gorolskigo) is an annual international cultural and folklore festival held in Jablunkov, Czech Republic, the first weekend in August. It lasts from Friday to Sunday. It is organized by the Polish Cultural and Educational Union (PZKO) and the folklore group Gorol, and preserves the traditions of the Czech Poles and Silesian Gorals. It is the largest cultural and folklore festival in the Trans-Olza area, drawing thousands of spectators each day of festivities. In 2007 almost 20,000 people visited the festival. Notable personalities, mainly from the Czech Republic and Poland, also visit the festival each year. In 2007 Prime Minister of the Czech Republic Mirek Topolánek visited the festival.

The primary goal of the festival is the presentation of Goral folklore groups from the environs of Jabłonków and the rest of the Zaolzie region. Such groups were appearing at the festival until 1955, when for the first time groups from outside the region were invited. Folklore groups from the Polish part of the Beskid Mountains are invited each year as well. Folklore groups from other countries also appear.

The festival has its roots in the earlier Święta Gór (Feasts of the Mountains), which were gatherings of Gorals from Jabłonków parish. After the end of World War II the idea of reviving the tradition was considered by local Polish activists. The General Committee of the PZKO decided on 22 July 1948 that a festival be held that August, later rescheduled to 12 September. At the suggestion of Karol Piegza, Polish writer and folklorist, it was named Święto Góralskie. The current name, Gorolski Święto, is the same as the original one but in the local dialect and has been used since 1967. The first festival in 1948 was successful, and so it was decided to hold it annually. It became more and more popular and attracted ever more visitors from an ever broader area.

Several Gorals working as organizers and storytellers during the festival became very popular, particularly Władysław Niedoba (Jura spod Grónia), Ludwik Cienciała (Maciej), and Władysław Młynek (Hadam z Drugi Izby). The main storyteller of the festival is now Tadeusz Filipczyk (Filip). Since 1961 Niedoba has been responsible for the program of the festival. Młynek started his organizational work in 1973, and Filipczyk in 1986. Władysław Młynek's most important contribution to the festival is that he helped to join Gorolski Święto with Tydzień Kultury Beskidzkiej (The Week of Beskid Culture), a cultural and folklore festival in Wisła and other municipalities of the Beskids of Poland. The result of this cooperation is the annual appearance in Gorolski Święto of top Polish folklore groups and also groups from other countries. The first festival in 1948 was organized by only 21 people, and now the number of organizers reaches into the hundreds.

The festival is now held in Lasek Miejski (Municipal Forest). During the festival many small wooden cottages are set up, managed by local branches of the PZKO from surrounding Beskid villages. Visitors can buy there traditional food and beverages, like traditional miodula (mead). These wooden cottages have been a feature of Gorolski Święto since 1969. A stage was built in 1985.
