= Jaworzynka =

- Village
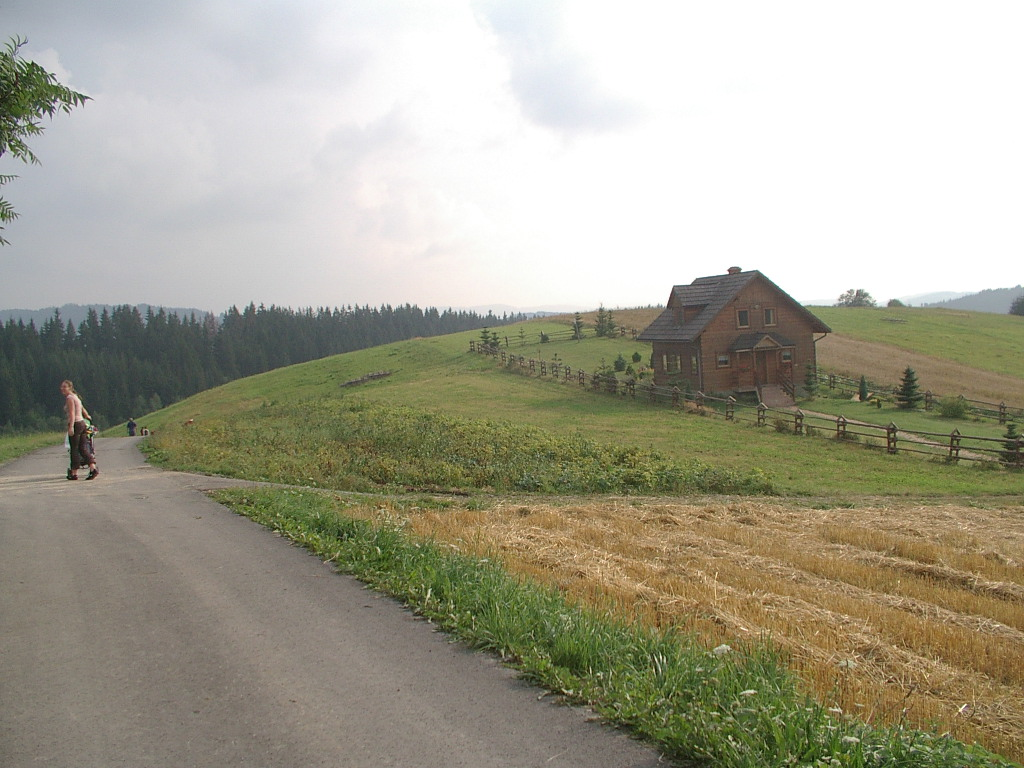
- Southern tip of Jaworzynka village
- Interactive map of Jaworzynka
- Location within Poland
- Coordinates: 49°31′44.8″N 18°51′34.9″E
- Country: Poland
- Voivodeship: Silesian
- County: Cieszyn
- Gmina: Istebna

Government
  - Mayor: Paweł Rucki

Area
  - Total: 22.15 km^{2} (8.55 sq mi)

Population (2012)
  - Total: 3,196
  - Density: 144.3/km^{2} (373.7/sq mi)
- Time zone: UTC+1 (CET)
  - Summer (DST): UTC+2 (CEST)
- Postal code: 43-476
- Car plates: SCI

Jaworzynka is a village in Gmina Istebna, Cieszyn County in Silesian Voivodeship, southern Poland. The village is situated in the Beskid Śląski mountain range, near Poland's borders with the Czech Republic and Slovakia, in the historical region of Cieszyn Silesia.

The village's name is a toponym, deriving from the Polish word for sycamore trees (jawor) in its diminutive form (jaworzyna).

== History ==
The village was first mentioned in 1621 as Jaworzinka. It belonged then to the Duchy of Teschen, a fee of Kingdom of Bohemia and a part of the Habsburg monarchy.

After Revolutions of 1848 in the Austrian Empire a modern municipal division was introduced in the re-established Austrian Silesia. The village as a municipality was subscribed to the political district of Cieszyn and the legal district of Jablunkov. According to the censuses conducted in 1880, 1890, 1900 and 1910 the population of the municipality grew from 1,369 in 1880 to 1,642 in 1910 with the majority being native Silesian and Polish-speakers (between 99.4% and 99.9%) accompanied by German-speaking (at most 8 or 0.6% in 1890) and Czech-speaking people (at most 6 or 0.4% in 1910). In terms of religion in 1910 the majority were Roman Catholics (98.9%), followed by Protestants (19 or 1.1%). The village was also traditionally inhabited by Silesian Gorals, speaking Jablunkov dialect.

After World War I, fall of Austria-Hungary, Polish–Czechoslovak War and the division of Cieszyn Silesia in 1920, it became a part of Poland and was transferred to Cieszyn County. In 1924 part of the village was separated from Jaworzynka and formed a new village, Hrčava, transferred to Czechoslovakia. Jaworzynka was then annexed by Nazi Germany at the beginning of World War II. After the war it was restored to Poland.

== Emigration ==
Many families from the Jaworzyka and Istebna area emigrated to Sheridan, Wyoming to work in underground coal mines along the Tongue River.

== Notable people ==
- Mateusz Haratyk, cross-country skier

== See also ==
- Jaworzynka Valley
