= Písek (Frýdek-Místek District) =

Písek Piosek
- Municipality
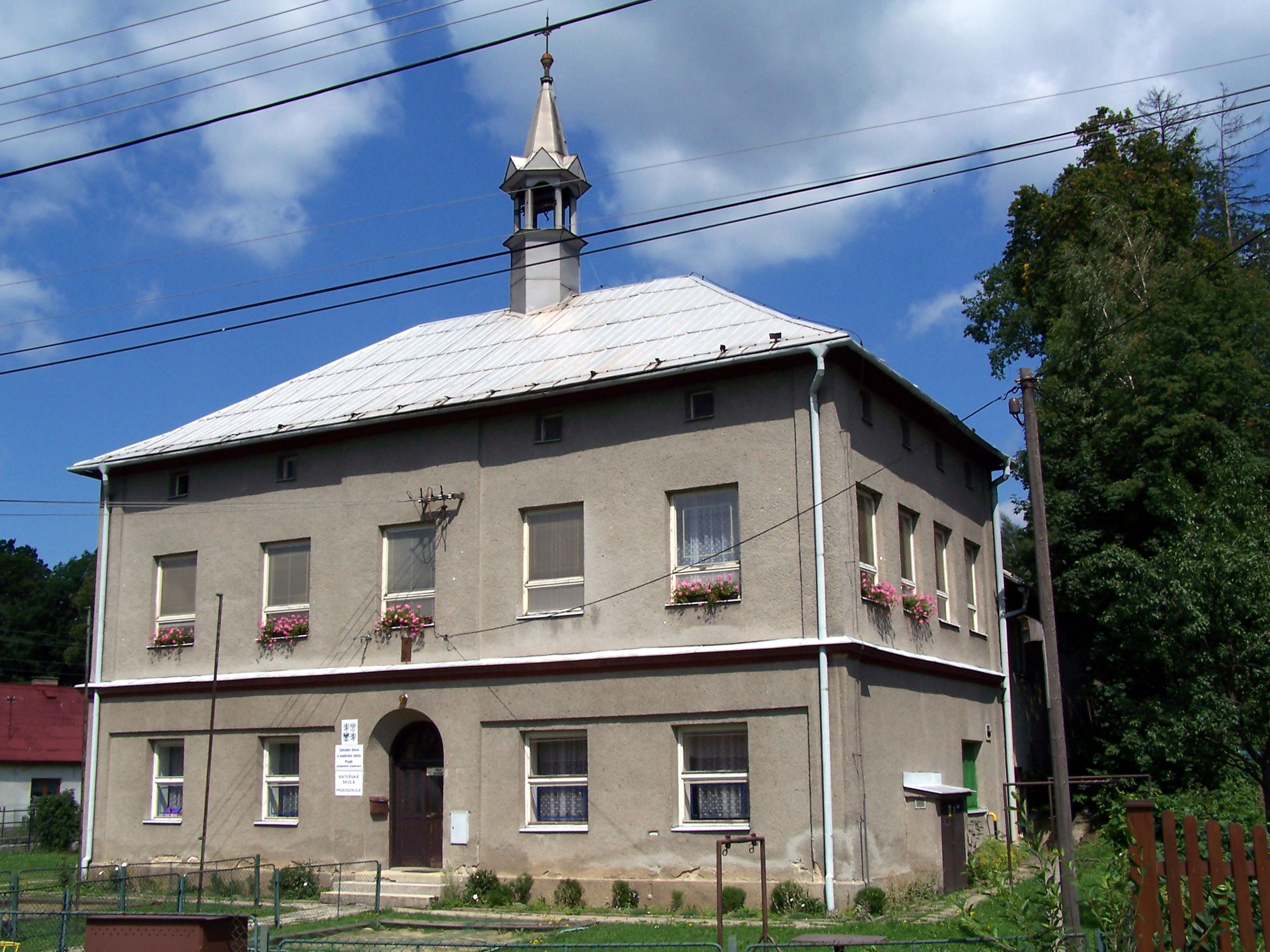
- Primary school and kindergarten

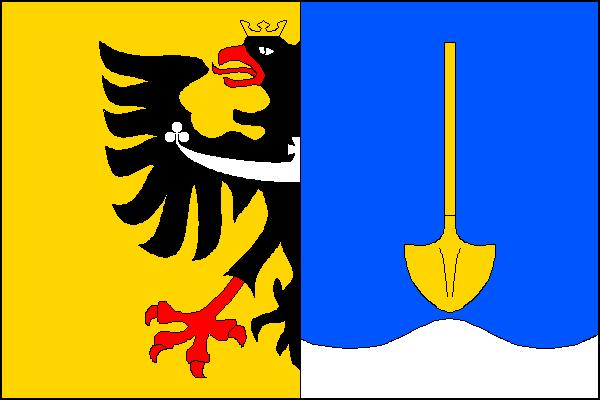
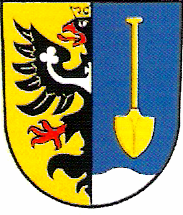
- Flag Coat of arms

- Location in the Czech Republic
- Coordinates: 49°33′33″N 18°48′8″E
- Country: Czech Republic
- Region: Moravian-Silesian
- District: Frýdek-Místek
- First mentioned: 1466

Area
  - Total: 15.46 km^{2} (5.97 sq mi)
- Elevation: 420 m (1,380 ft)

Population (2026-01-01)
  - Total: 1,882
  - Density: 121.7/km^{2} (315.3/sq mi)
- Time zone: UTC+1 (CET)
  - Summer (DST): UTC+2 (CEST)
- Postal code: 739 84
- Website: www.obecpisek.cz

Písek (Czech pronunciation: [ˈpiːsɛk]; Polish: Piosek, German: Piosek) is a municipality and village in Frýdek-Místek District in the Moravian-Silesian Region of the Czech Republic. It has about 1,900 inhabitants. The municipality has a significant Polish minority.

== Etymology ==
The name of the municipality literally means 'sand'. Historically it has been scribed as Piesek (1523), Pisek (1577, 1621), Pyßek/Pioßek (1643), Piasek (1652) and so on.

== Geography ==
Písek is located about 34 kilometres (21 mi) southeast of Frýdek-Místek and 45 km (28 mi) southeast of Ostrava. It lies in the historical region of Cieszyn Silesia, a small part of the municipality borders with Poland. The Olza River flows through the municipality.

The municipal territory is located on the border between two mountain ranges. The northern part lies in the Silesian Beskids, the southern part lies in the Jablunkov Intermontane. The highest point is the mountain Kyčera/Kiczory on the Czech–Polish border at 989 m (3,245 ft) above sea level.

== History ==
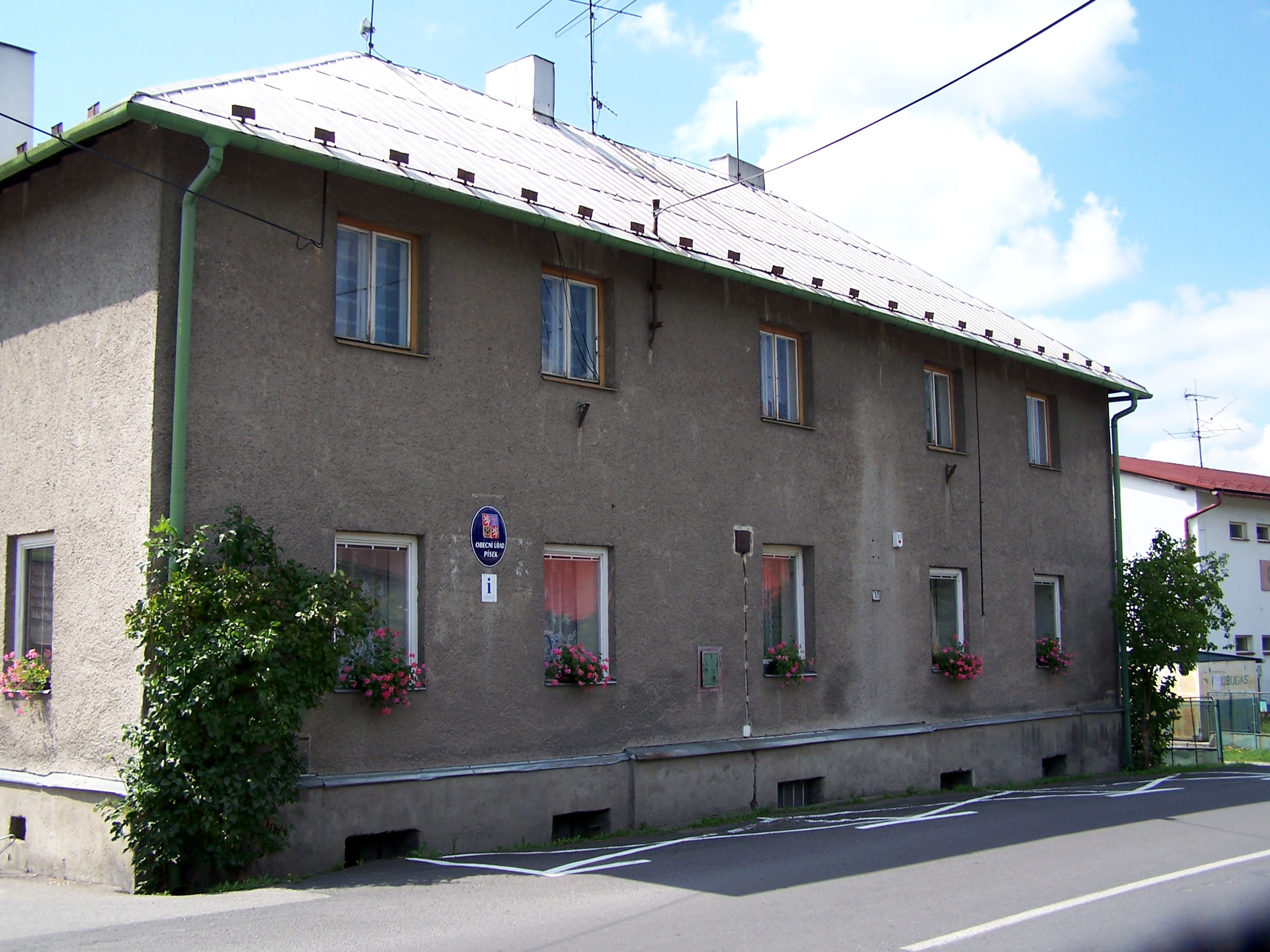
Municipal office

Písek was established most probably in the 14th century. Historians presume that on the basis of establishment date of nearby Bukowiec (1353). The first written mention of Písek is in a document from 1466 where a local Vogt was mentioned. Politically Písek belonged initially to the Duchy of Teschen.

The villagers lived mainly off farming, pastoralism and forestry. In 1692, there was a mill. After the establishment of Třinec Iron and Steel Works in 1839 many inhabitants of Písek went to work there and agriculture has become a side activity for most of them.

After Revolutions of 1848 in the Austrian Empire, a modern municipal division was introduced in the re-established Austrian Silesia. The village as a municipality was subscribed to the political district of Teschen and the legal district of Jablunkau. According to the censuses conducted in 1880–1910, the population of the municipality grew from 884 in 1880 to 1,055 in 1910 with a majority being native Polish-speakers (dropping from 100% in 1880 to 97.5% in 1910) accompanied by German-speaking (at most 2.5% in 1910) and Czech-speaking people (at most 1.1% in 1910). In terms of religion in 1910 the majority were Roman Catholics (59.5%), followed by Protestants (40.5%).

After World War I, Polish–Czechoslovak War and the division of Cieszyn Silesia in 1920, it became a part of Czechoslovakia. Following the Munich Agreement, in October 1938 together with the Trans-Olza region it was annexed by Poland, administratively adjoined to Cieszyn County of Silesian Voivodeship. It was then annexed by Nazi Germany at the beginning of World War II. After the war it was restored to Czechoslovakia.

From 1980 to 1990, Písek was a municipal part of Jablunkov.

== Demographics ==
According to the 2021 Census, Polish minority makes up 15.4% of the population.

Historical population

Year	Pop.	±%
1869	855	—
1880	884	+3.4%
1890	989	+11.9%
1900	1,003	+1.4%
1910	1,055	+5.2%

Year	Pop.	±%
1921	1,083	+2.7%
1930	1,204	+11.2%
1950	1,309	+8.7%
1961	1,452	+10.9%
1970	1,496	+3.0%

Year	Pop.	±%
1980	1,608	+7.5%
1991	1,668	+3.7%
2001	1,783	+6.9%
2011	1,757	−1.5%
2021	1,796	+2.2%

Source: Censuses

== Transport ==
There are no railways or major roads passing through the municipality.

== Sights ==
Písek is poor in historical buildings. The Roman Catholic Church of Divine Mercy was built in 1995. The second church in the municipality is a SCEAV Lutheran church, built in 2010–2011.

== Gallery ==
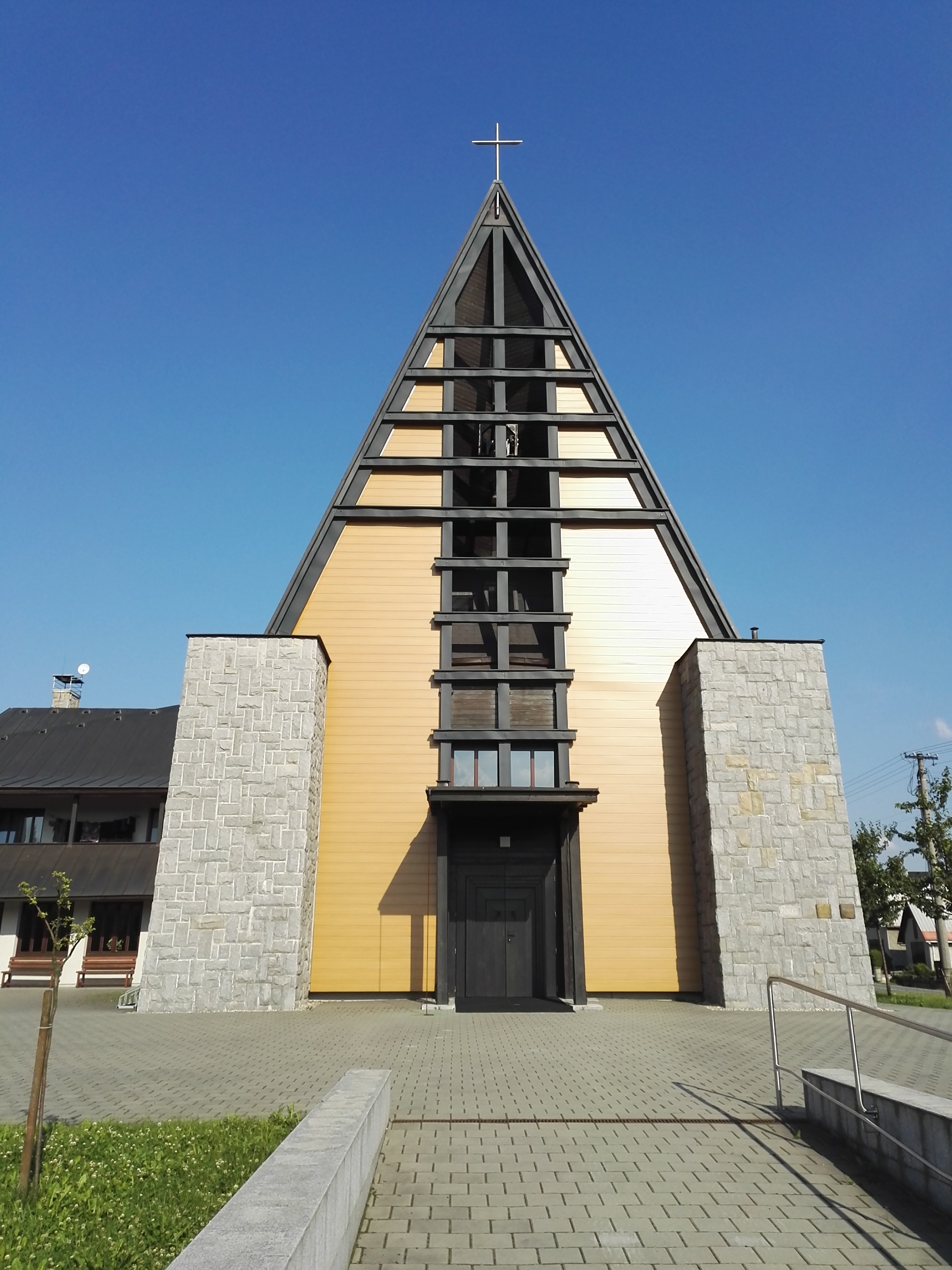
Lutheran church

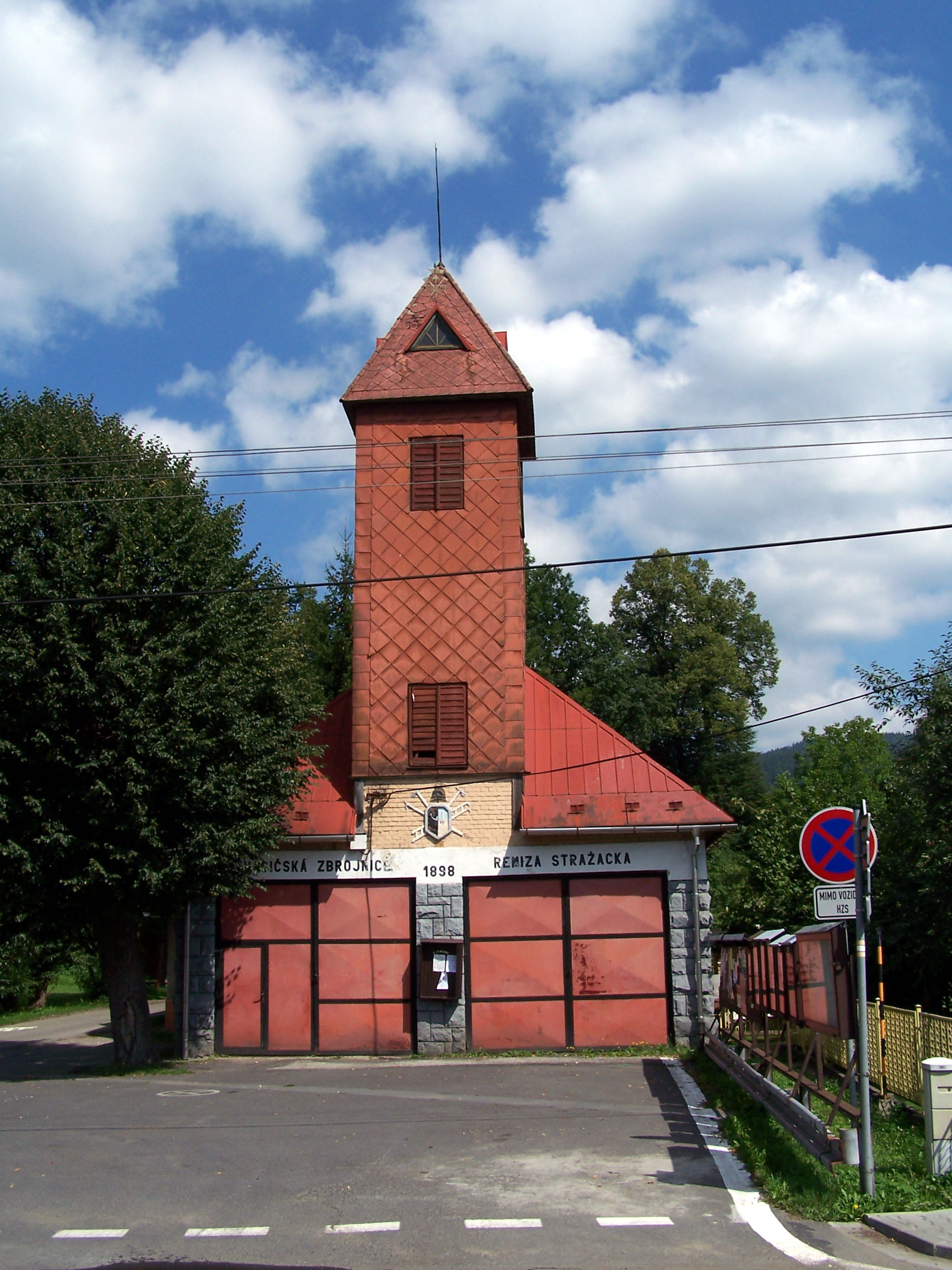
Fire station

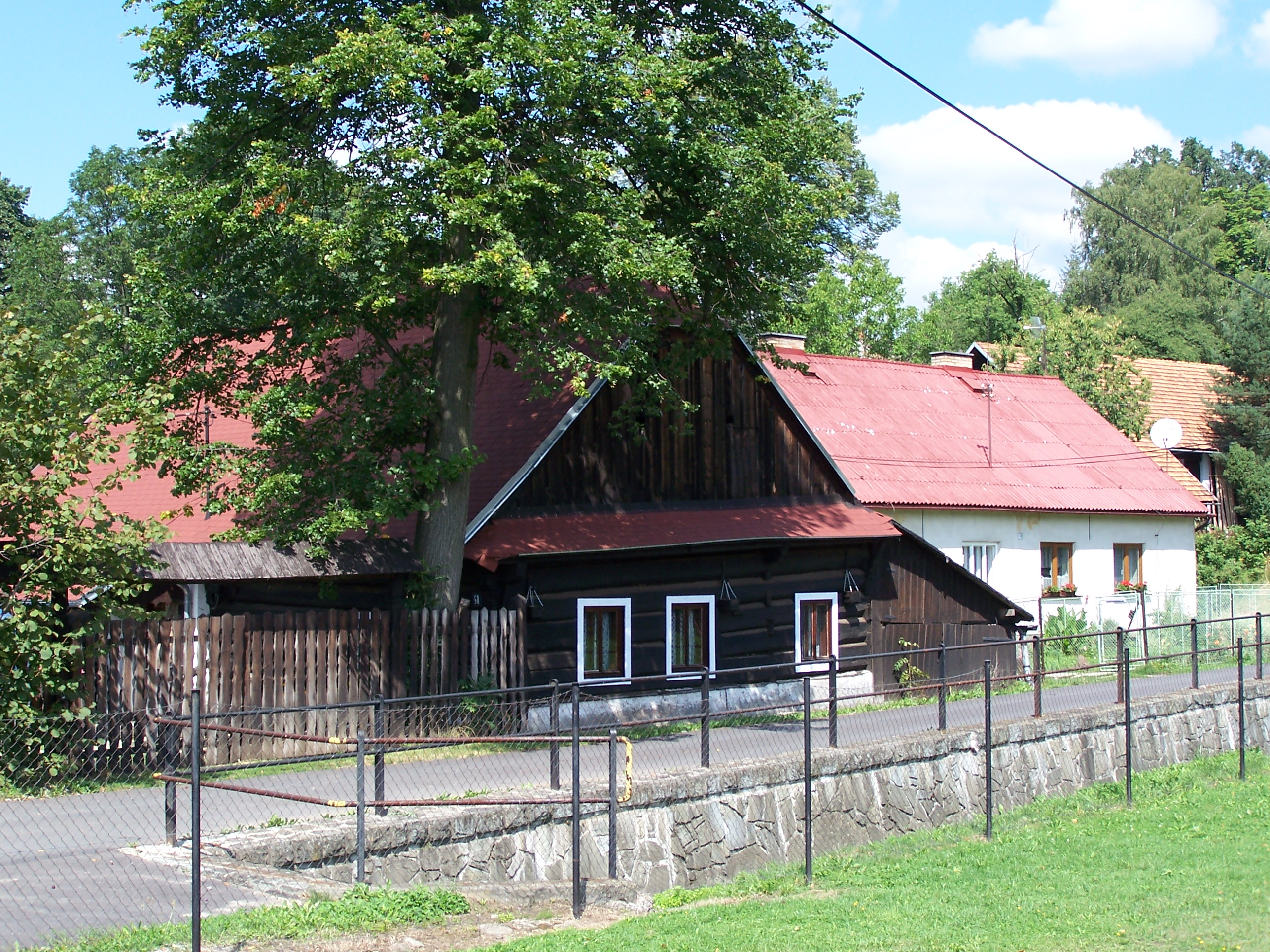
Old wooden house
