= Bocanovice =

Bocanovice Boconowice
- Municipality
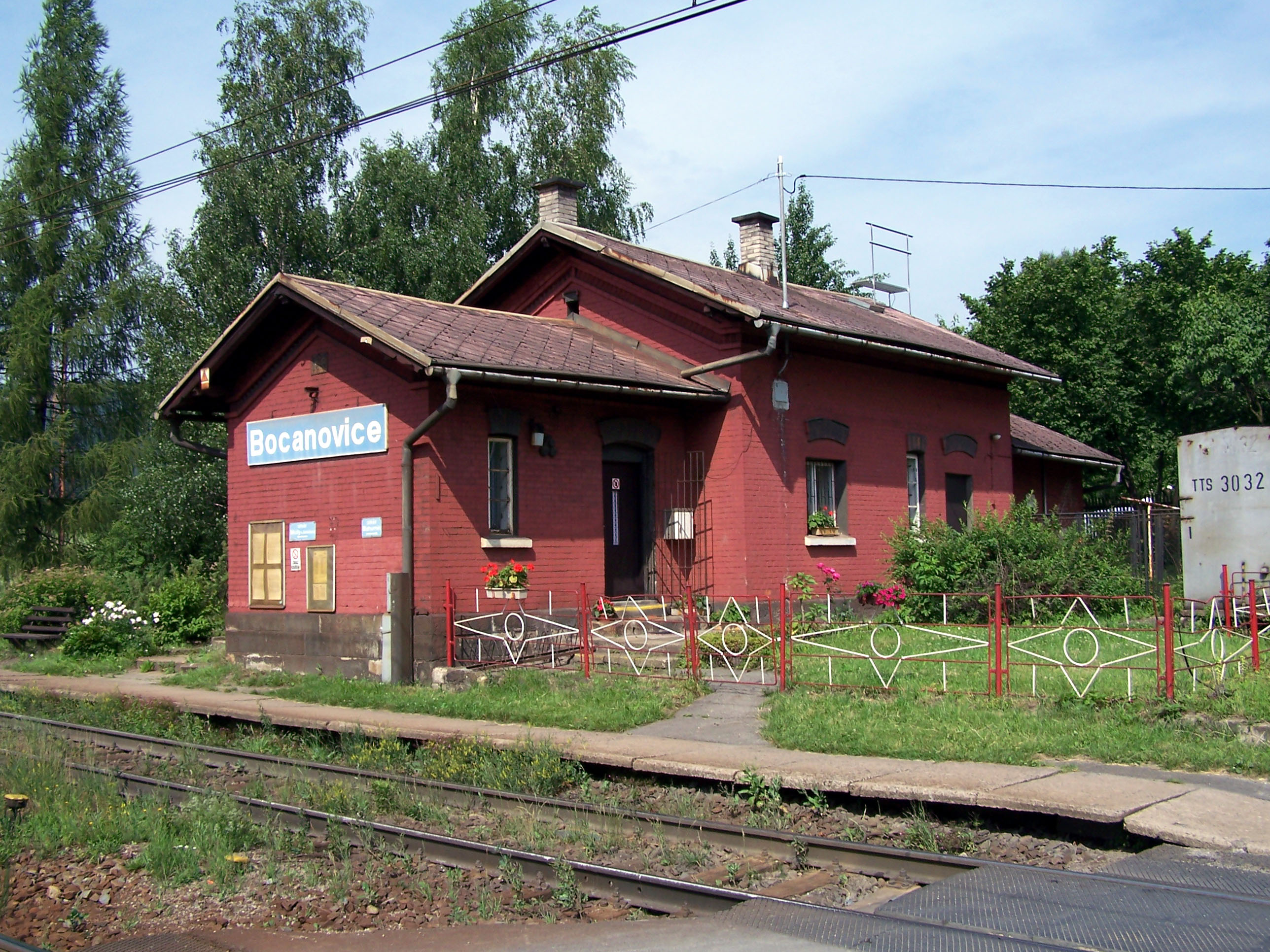
- Railway station

- Flag Coat of arms

- Location in the Czech Republic
- Coordinates: 49°34′9″N 18°44′18″E
- Country: Czech Republic
- Region: Moravian-Silesian
- District: Frýdek-Místek
- First mentioned: 1597

Area
  - Total: 3.77 km^{2} (1.46 sq mi)
- Elevation: 418 m (1,371 ft)

Population (2026-01-01)
  - Total: 498
  - Density: 132/km^{2} (342/sq mi)
- Time zone: UTC+1 (CET)
  - Summer (DST): UTC+2 (CEST)
- Postal code: 739 91
- Website: www.bocanovice.cz

Bocanovice (Czech pronunciation: [ˈbotsanovɪtsɛ]; Polish: Boconowice) is a municipality and village in Frýdek-Místek District in the Moravian-Silesian Region of the Czech Republic. It has about 500 inhabitants. The municipality has a significant Polish minority.

== Etymology ==
The name is derived from Polish word bocian (meaning 'stork'). The storks hunted frogs that lived abundantly in the wetlands that used to be here.

== Geography ==
Bocanovice is located about 29 kilometres (18 mi) southeast of Frýdek-Místek and 40 km (25 mi) southeast of Ostrava. It is situated in the historical region of Cieszyn Silesia. The western part of the municipality lies in the Moravian-Silesian Beskids and the eastern part lies in the Jablunkov Furrow lowland. The highest point is at 730 m (2,395 ft) above sea level. The Lomná River forms the eastern municipal border.

== History ==
The first written mention of Bocanovice is from 1597. It belonged then to the Duchy of Teschen. It was the princely court, where four families originally settled and cultivated the fields of the court and performed all farm work. The village was then settled by the Vlachs, who came with their flocks of sheep from Romania.

After Revolutions of 1848 in the Austrian Empire a modern municipal division was introduced in the re-established Austrian Silesia. The village as a municipality was subscribed to the political district of Cieszyn and the legal district of Jablunkov. According to the censuses conducted in 1880–1910 the population of the municipality grew from 282 in 1880 to 330 in 1910 with the majority being native Polish-speakers (between 96.6% and 99.1%) accompanied by few German-speaking (at most 9 or 3.1% in 1890) and Czech-speaking people (at most 2 or 0.6% in 1900). In terms of religion in 1910 the majority were Roman Catholics (80.3%), followed by Protestants (19.7%).

After World War I, Polish–Czechoslovak War and the division of Cieszyn Silesia in 1920, the municipality became a part of Czechoslovakia. Following the Munich Agreement, in October 1938 together with the Trans-Olza region it was annexed by Poland, administratively adjoined to Cieszyn County of Silesian Voivodeship. It was then annexed by Nazi Germany at the beginning of World War II. After the war it was restored to Czechoslovakia.

From 1961 to 1990, Bocanovice was a municipal part of Jablunkov. Since 1990, it has been a separate municipality.

== Demographics ==
According to the 2021 Census, Polish minority makes up 23.4% of the population.

Historical population

Year	Pop.	±%
1869	253	—
1880	282	+11.5%
1890	295	+4.6%
1900	355	+20.3%
1910	330	−7.0%

Year	Pop.	±%
1921	346	+4.8%
1930	344	−0.6%
1950	385	+11.9%
1961	445	+15.6%
1970	216	−51.5%

Year	Pop.	±%
1980	396	+83.3%
1991	371	−6.3%
2001	428	+15.4%
2011	426	−0.5%
2021	449	+5.4%

Source: Censuses

== Transport ==
The I/11 road (part of the European route E75) runs through Bocanovice.

The Košice–Bohumín Railway goes through the municipality.

== Sights ==
There are no protected cultural monuments in the municipality.
