= Horní Lomná =

Horní Lomná Łomna Górna
- Municipality
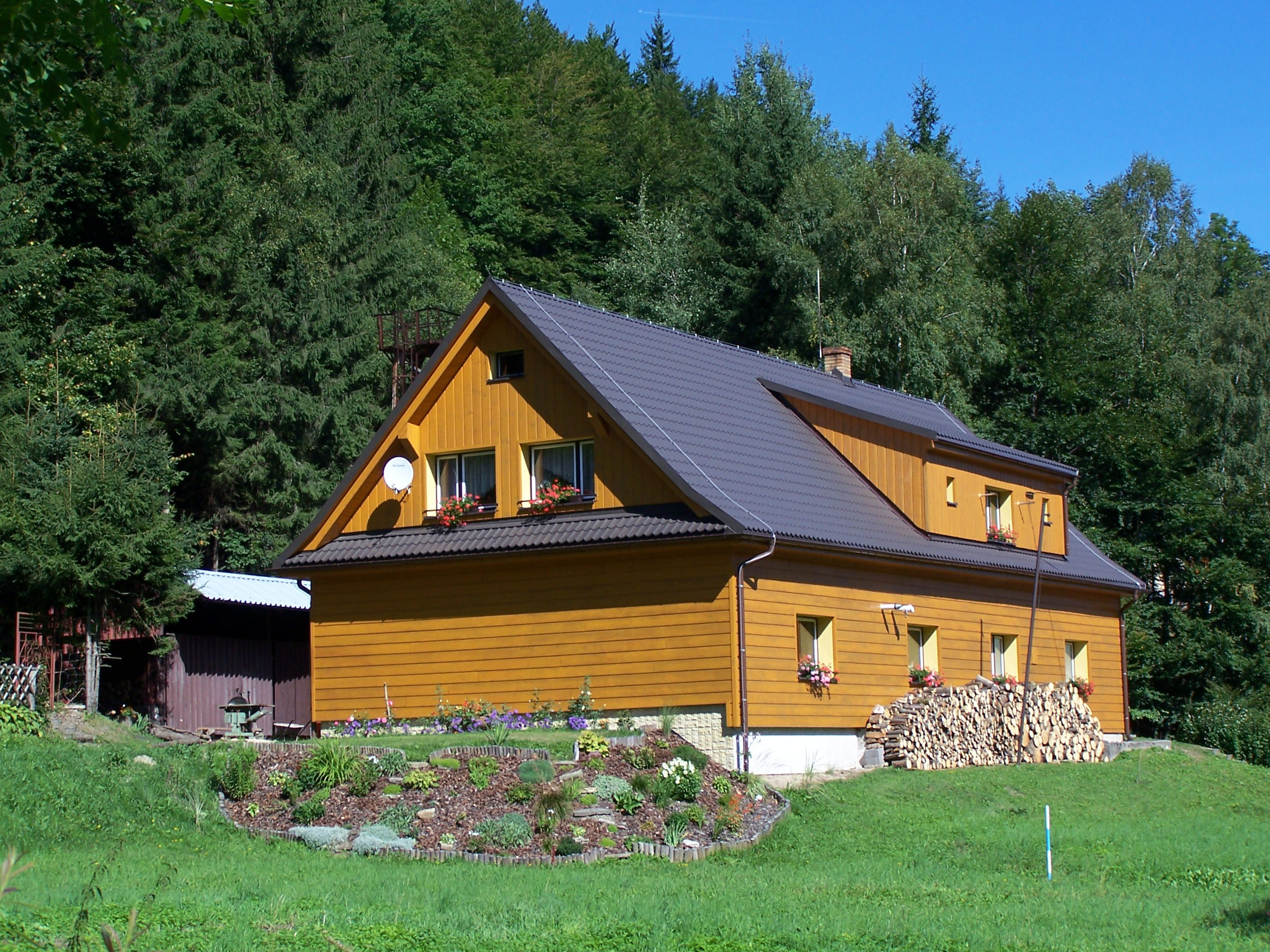
- Municipal office

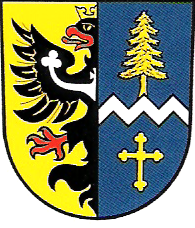
- Flag Coat of arms

- Location in the Czech Republic
- Coordinates: 49°31′40″N 18°38′14″E
- Country: Czech Republic
- Region: Moravian-Silesian
- District: Frýdek-Místek
- First mentioned: 1690

Area
  - Total: 24.70 km^{2} (9.54 sq mi)
- Elevation: 595 m (1,952 ft)

Population (2026-01-01)
  - Total: 381
  - Density: 15.4/km^{2} (40.0/sq mi)
- Time zone: UTC+1 (CET)
  - Summer (DST): UTC+2 (CEST)
- Postal code: 739 91
- Website: hornilomna.eu

Horní Lomná (Polish: Łomna Górna, German: Ober Lomna) is a municipality and village in Frýdek-Místek District in the Moravian-Silesian Region of the Czech Republic. It has about 400 inhabitants. The municipality has a significant Polish minority.

== Etymology ==
The name of the village is borrowed from an older name of the Lomná river (mentioned in 1592 as Lomny), which itself is derived from the words lom ('turn', 'bend').

== Geography ==
Horní Lomná is located about 26 kilometres (16 mi) southeast of Frýdek-Místek and 38 km (24 mi) southeast of Ostrava. The municipal territory borders Slovakia on the south. It lies in the historical region of Cieszyn Silesia, in the Moravian-Silesian Beskids mountain range. The highest point is the mountain Velký Polom at 1,067 m (3,501 ft) above sea level, located on the Czech–Slovak border. The Lomná River flows through the municipality.

Horní Lomná lies in the Beskydy Protected Landscape Area. There also several small-scale protected areas; the most notable is the Mionší National Nature Reserve, which is among the largest old-growth forests in the Czech Republic.

== History ==
The settlement on the territory of the village in the Lomná river valley in the Moravian-Silesian Beskids began in the middle of the 17th century. The village was first mentioned in 1684 as Lomna. It belonged then to the Duchy of Teschen, a fee of the Kingdom of Bohemia and a part of the Habsburg monarchy.

After Revolutions of 1848 in the Austrian Empire a modern municipal division was introduced in the re-established Austrian Silesia. Lomna as a single municipality was subscribed to the political district of Cieszyn and the legal district of Jablunkov. In 1873, two separate settlements were recognised: Dolní Lomná (as Dolny Lomna) and Horní Lomná (as Wrchny Lomna). They were divided into two separate municipalities on 1 January 1890. According to the censuses conducted in 1890, 1900 and 1910 the population of the municipality grew from 524 in 1890 to 624 in 1910. In 1910, the majority of the inhabitants were native Polish-speakers (97.9%), accompanied by a Czech-speaking minority (11 or 1.8%) and German-speakers (2 people). In terms of religion in 1910 the majority were Roman Catholics (95.5%), followed by Protestants (28 or 4.5%).

After World War I, Polish–Czechoslovak War and the division of Cieszyn Silesia in 1920, the municipality became a part of Czechoslovakia. Following the Munich Agreement, in October 1938 together with the Trans-Olza region it was annexed by Poland, administratively adjoined to Cieszyn County of Silesian Voivodeship. It was then annexed by Nazi Germany at the beginning of World War II. After the war it was restored to Czechoslovakia.

From 1980 to 1990, Horní Lomná was a municipal part of Jablunkov.

== Demographics ==
According to the 2021 Census, Polish minority makes up 17.6% of the population.

Historical population

Year	Pop.	±%
1869	524	—
1880	532	+1.5%
1890	524	−1.5%
1900	623	+18.9%
1910	624	+0.2%

Year	Pop.	±%
1921	601	−3.7%
1930	607	+1.0%
1950	542	−10.7%
1961	535	−1.3%
1970	524	−2.1%

Year	Pop.	±%
1980	499	−4.8%
1991	430	−13.8%
2001	394	−8.4%
2011	352	−10.7%
2021	329	−6.5%

Source: Censuses

== Transport ==
There are no railways or major roads passing through the municipality.

== Sights ==
The main landmark of Horní Lomná is the Church of the Exaltation of the Holy Cross. It was built in the neo-Gothic style in 1894–1896.
