= Lomná (river) =

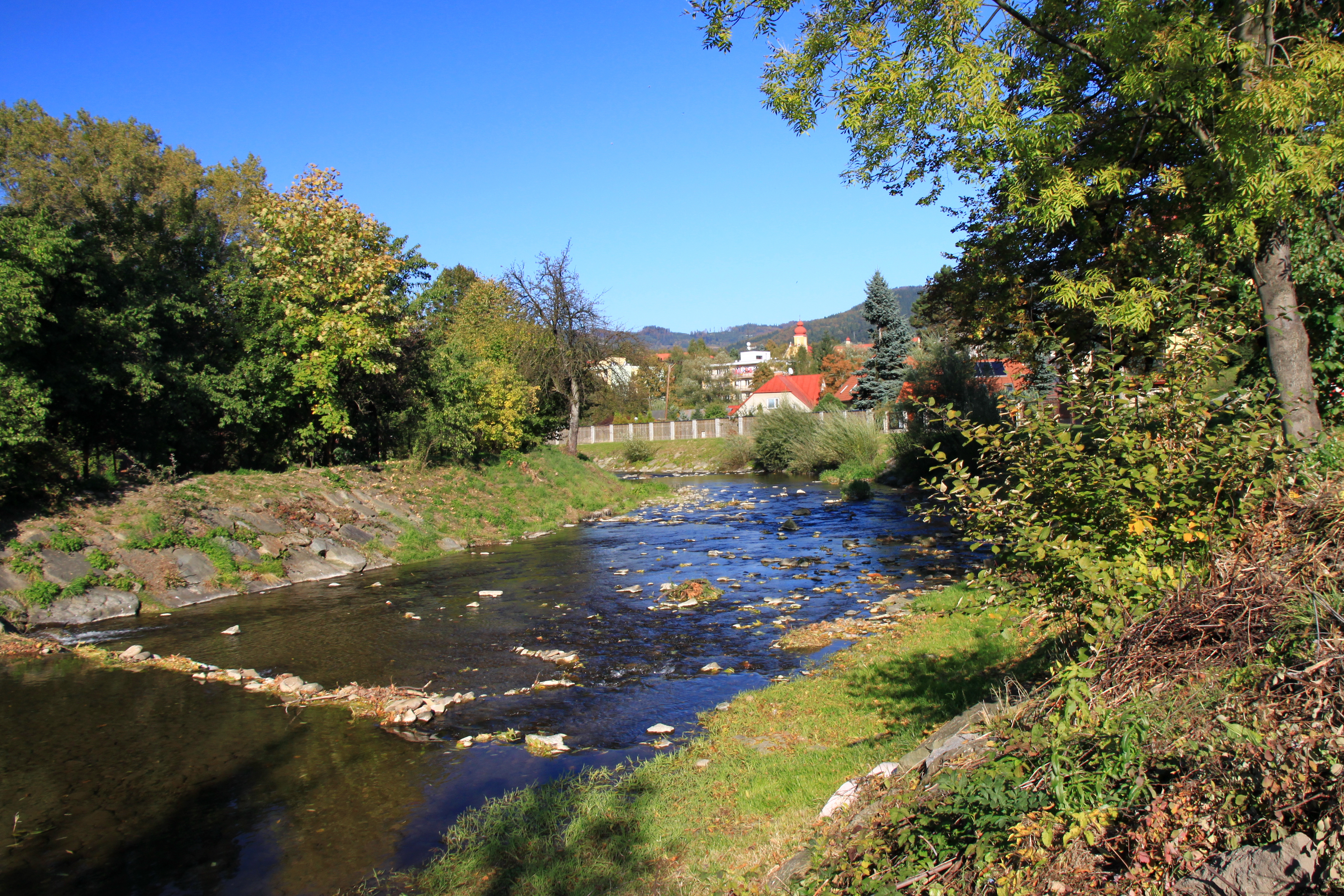
- The Lomná in Jablunkov

Location
- Country: Czech Republic
- Region: Moravian-Silesian

Physical characteristics
- Source
  - location: Horní Lomná, Moravian-Silesian Beskids
  - coordinates: 49°29′51″N 18°36′16″E
  - elevation: 973 m (3,192 ft)
- Mouth
  - location: Olza
  - coordinates: 49°34′45″N 18°45′51″E
  - elevation: 380 m (1,250 ft)
- Length: 17.6 km (10.9 mi)
- Basin size: 70.6 km^{2} (27.3 sq mi)
- Discharge
  - average: 1.34 m^{3}/s (47 cu ft/s) near estuary

Basin features
- Progression: Olza→ Oder→ Baltic Sea

The Lomná (Polish: Łomna) is a river in the Czech Republic, a left tributary of the Olza. It flows through the Moravian-Silesian Region. It is 17.6 km (10.9 mi) long.

== Etymology ==
The name is derived from the Slavic word lom, meaning 'turn', 'bend', but and earlier also 'clatter', 'rumble'. The name was first mentioned in 1592.

== Characteristic ==
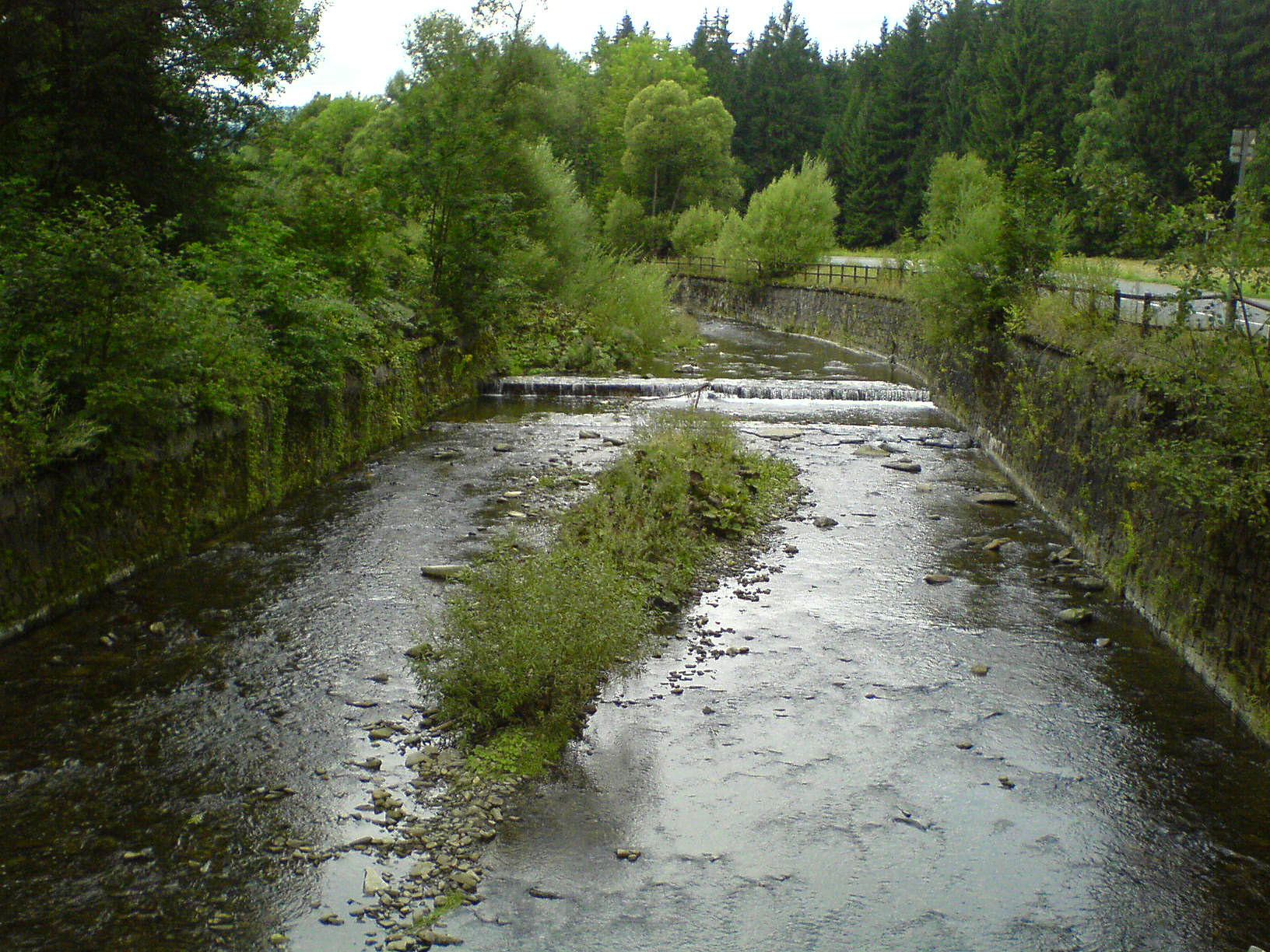
The Lomná in Dolní Lomná

The Lomná originates in the territory of Horní Lomná in the Moravian-Silesian Beskids at an elevation of 973 m (3,192 ft) and flows to Jablunkov, where it merges with the Olza River at an elevation of 380 m (1,250 ft). It is 17.6 km (10.9 mi) long. Its drainage basin has an area of 70.6 km^{2} (27.3 sq mi). The average discharge at its mouth is 1.34 m3/s.

The longest tributaries of the Lomná are:

| Tributary | Length (km) | Side |
|---|---|---|
| Ošetnice | 9.3 | right |
| Jestřabí | 4.6 | right |

== Course ==
The river flows through the municipal territories of Horní Lomná, Dolní Lomná, Mosty u Jablunkova, Bocanovice and Jablunkov.

== Nature ==
Most of the river flows through the Beskydy Protected Landscape Area.

Among the protected species of fish living in the river are the common minnow and alpine bullhead. Part of the river is a hunting ground for Eurasian otter, also protected within the Czech Republic.

== See also ==
- List of rivers of the Czech Republic
