= Dolní Lomná =

Dolní Lomná Łomna Dolna
- Municipality
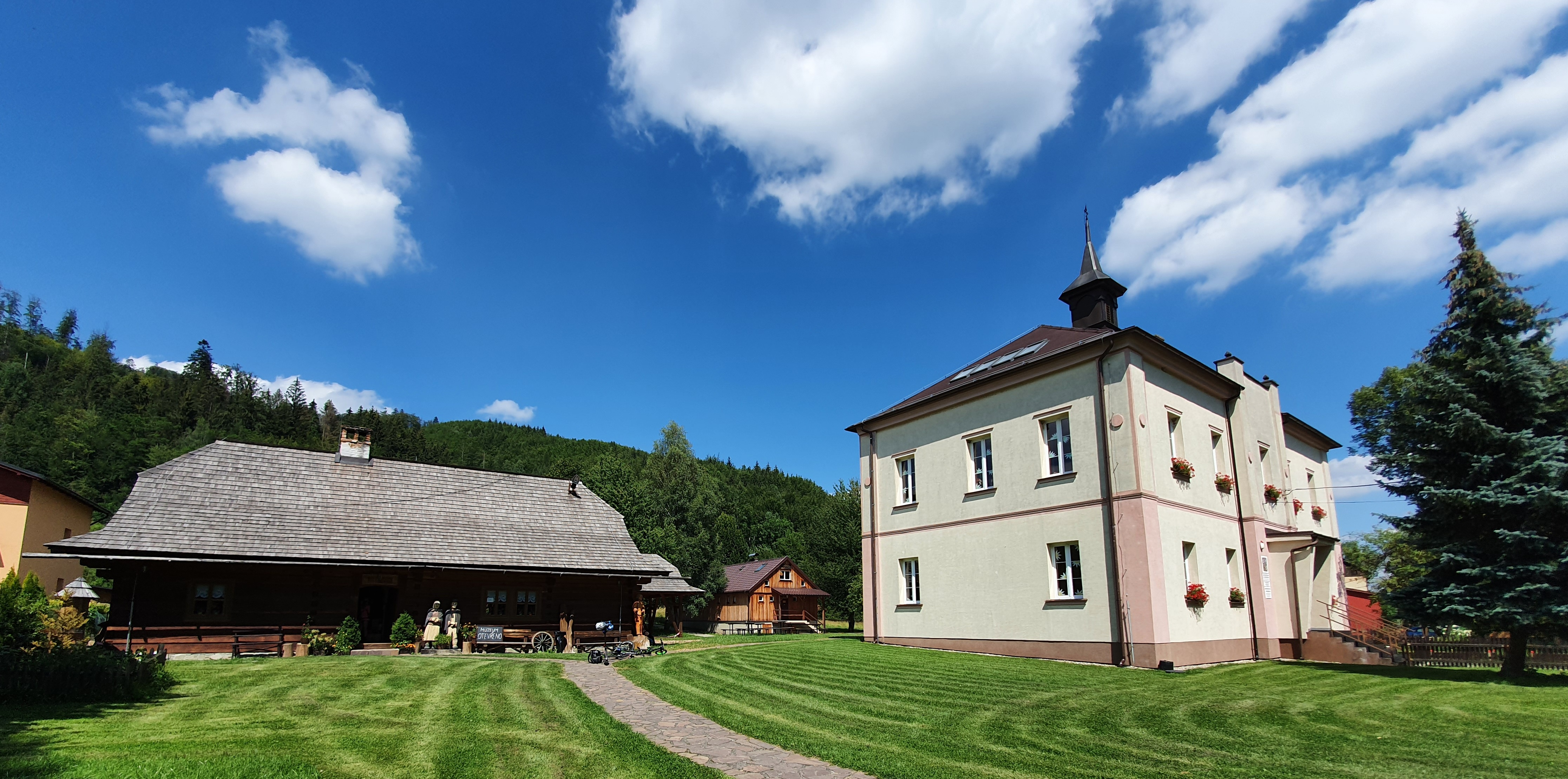
- Museum and Polish primary school

- Flag Coat of arms

- Location in the Czech Republic
- Coordinates: 49°32′52″N 18°42′22″E
- Country: Czech Republic
- Region: Moravian-Silesian
- District: Frýdek-Místek
- First mentioned: 1684

Area
  - Total: 26.99 km^{2} (10.42 sq mi)
- Elevation: 460 m (1,510 ft)

Population (2026-01-01)
  - Total: 914
  - Density: 33.9/km^{2} (87.7/sq mi)
- Time zone: UTC+1 (CET)
  - Summer (DST): UTC+2 (CEST)
- Postal code: 739 91
- Website: www.dolnilomna.eu

Dolní Lomná (Polish: Łomna Dolna, German: Nieder Lomna) is a municipality and village in Frýdek-Místek District in the Moravian-Silesian Region of the Czech Republic. It has about 900 inhabitants. The municipality has a significant Polish minority.

== Etymology ==
The name is borrowed from an older name of the Lomná River (mentioned in 1592 as Lomny), which itself is derived from the word lom ('turn', 'bend').

== Geography ==
Dolní Lomná is located about 29 kilometres (18 mi) southeast of Frýdek-Místek and 41 km (25 mi) southeast of Ostrava, in the historical region of Cieszyn Silesia. The municipal territory borders Slovakia on the south. It lies in the Moravian-Silesian Beskids mountain range and within the Beskydy Protected Landscape Area. The highest point is near the top of the Kozubová mountain at 980 m (3,220 ft) above sea level. The Lomná River flows through the municipality.

== History ==
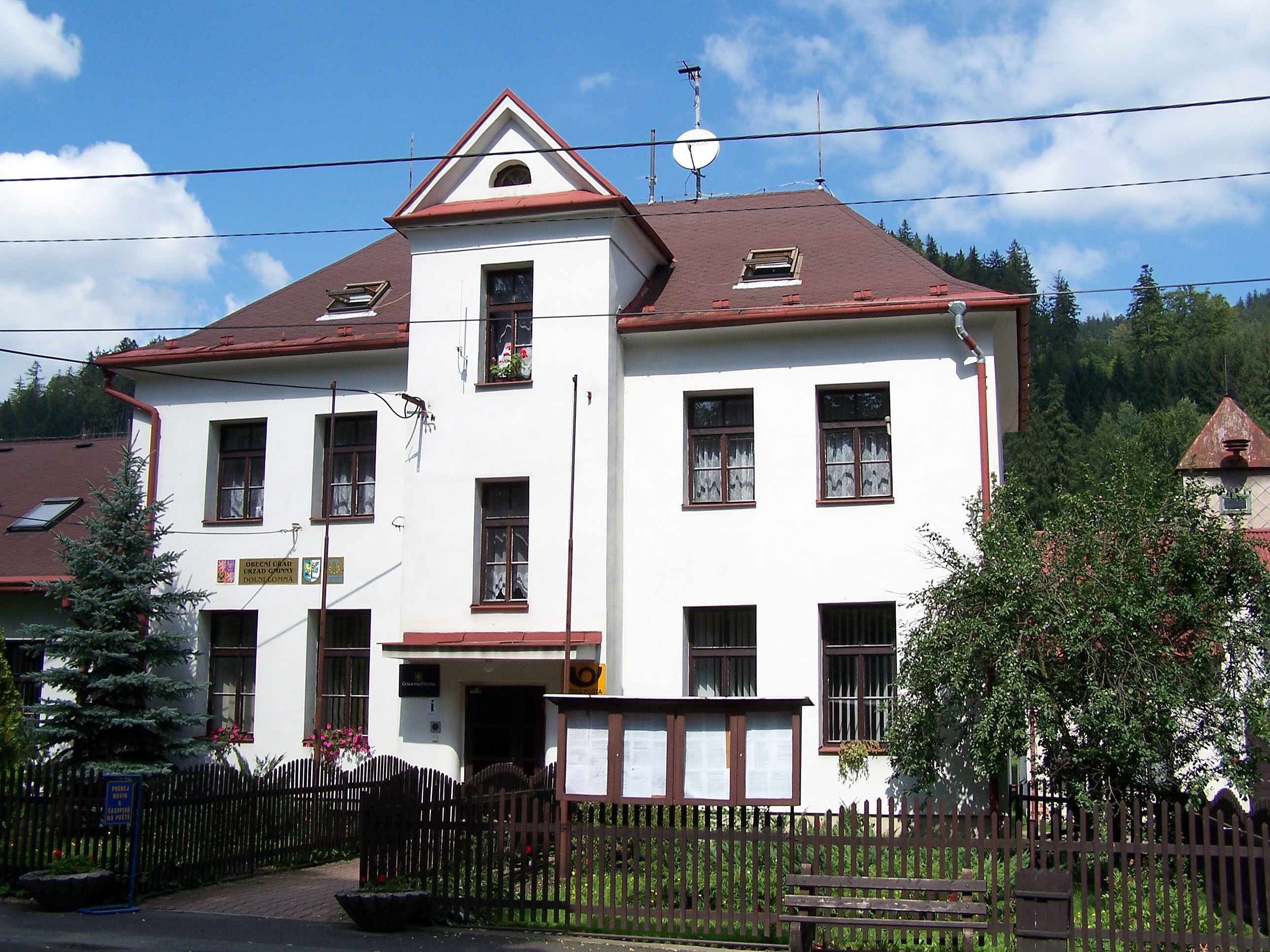
Municipal office and post office

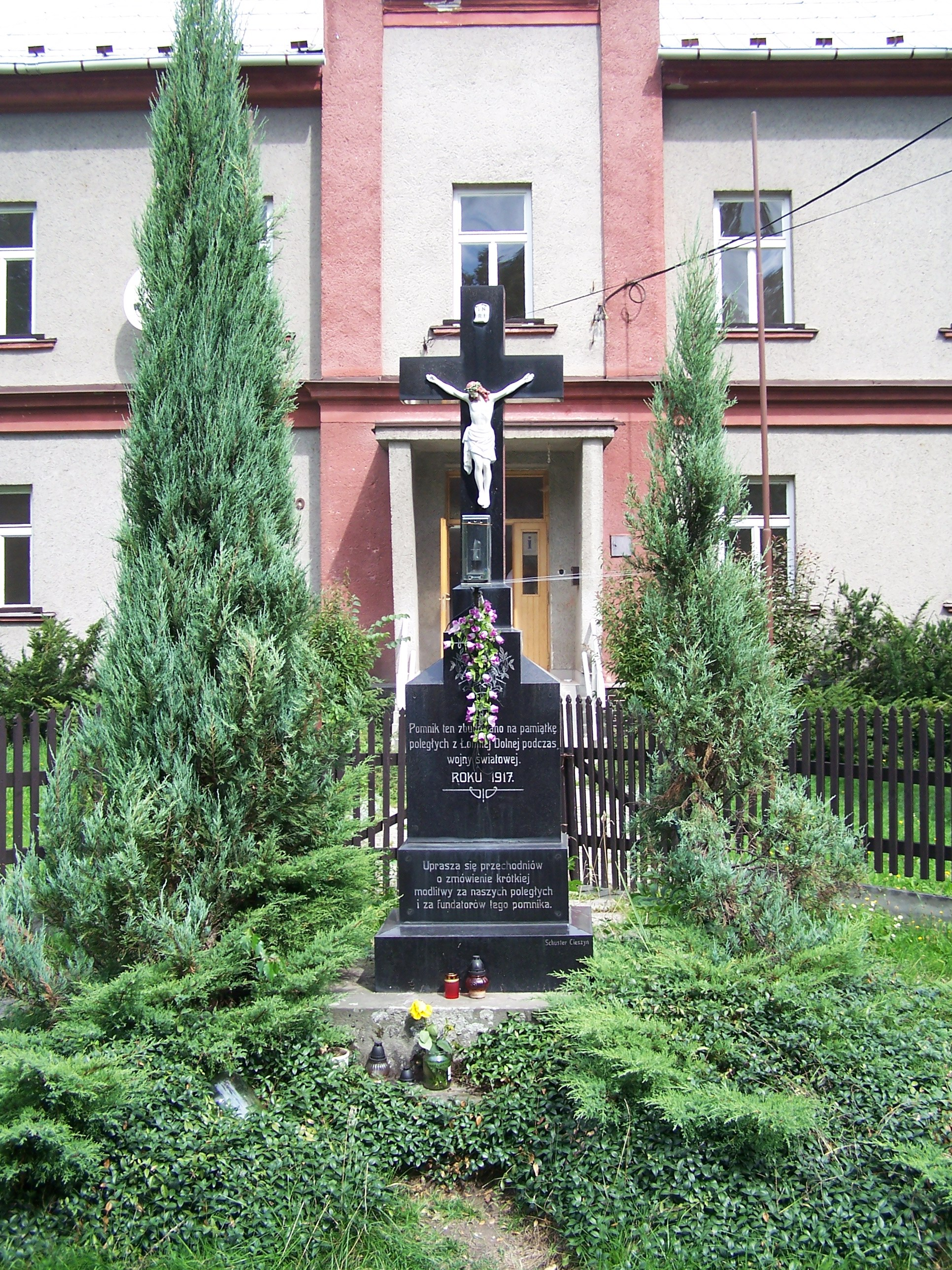
Monument to local victims of World War I

The settlement on the territory of the village in the Lomná river valley in the Moravian-Silesian Beskids began in the middle of the 17th century. The village was first mentioned in 1684 as Lomna. It belonged then to the Duchy of Teschen, a fee of the Kingdom of Bohemia.

After Revolutions of 1848 in the Austrian Empire a modern municipal division was introduced in the re-established Austrian Silesia. Lomna as a single municipality was subscribed to the political district of Cieszyn and the legal district of Jablunkov. In 1873 two separate settlements were recognised: Dolní Lomná (as Dolny Lomna) and Horní Lomná (as Wrchny Lomna). They were divided into two separate municipalities on 1 January 1890. According to the censuses conducted in 1890, 1900 and 1910 the population of the municipality grew from 857 in 1890 to 912 in 1910. In 1910 the majority of the inhabitants were native Polish-speakers (95.1%) accompanied by a German-speaking minority (32 or 3.5%) and Czech-speaking people (13 or 1.4%). In terms of religion in 1910 the majority were Roman Catholics (82.5%), followed by Protestants (17.3%) and Jews (2 people).

After World War I, Polish–Czechoslovak War and the division of Cieszyn Silesia in 1920, Dolní Lomná became a part of Czechoslovakia. Following the Munich Agreement, in October 1938 together with the Trans-Olza region it was annexed by Poland, administratively adjoined to Cieszyn County of Silesian Voivodeship. It was then annexed by Nazi Germany at the beginning of World War II. After the war it was restored to Czechoslovakia.

From 1980 to 1990, Dolní Lomná was a municipal part of Jablunkov.

== Demographics ==
According to the 2021 Census, Polish minority makes up 18.8% of the population.

Historical population

Year	Pop.	±%
1869	661	—
1880	787	+19.1%
1890	857	+8.9%
1900	863	+0.7%
1910	912	+5.7%

Year	Pop.	±%
1921	891	−2.3%
1930	1,005	+12.8%
1950	1,051	+4.6%
1961	1,035	−1.5%
1970	1,016	−1.8%

Year	Pop.	±%
1980	918	−9.6%
1991	809	−11.9%
2001	867	+7.2%
2011	843	−2.8%
2021	886	+5.1%

Source: Censuses

== Transport ==
There are no railways or major roads passing through the municipality.

== Sights ==
There are no protected cultural monuments in the municipality. The Lomná Museum is located in the wooden house that belonged to the local school. The original building from 1852 was moved to the Wallachian Open Air Museum in 1974; the current wooden house is its replica.
