= Jablunkov =

Jablunkov Jabłonków
- Town
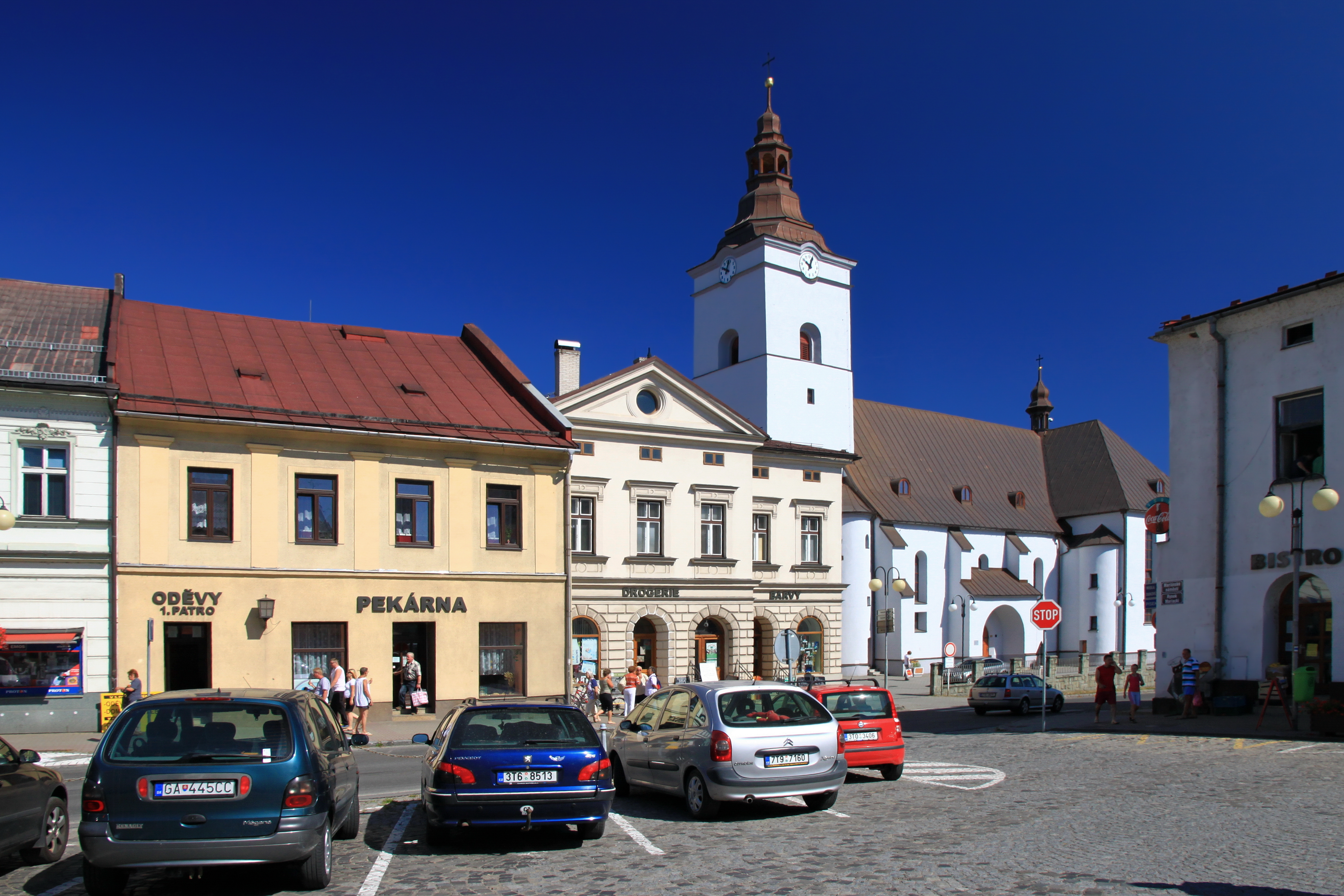
- Town square with Church of Corpus Christi

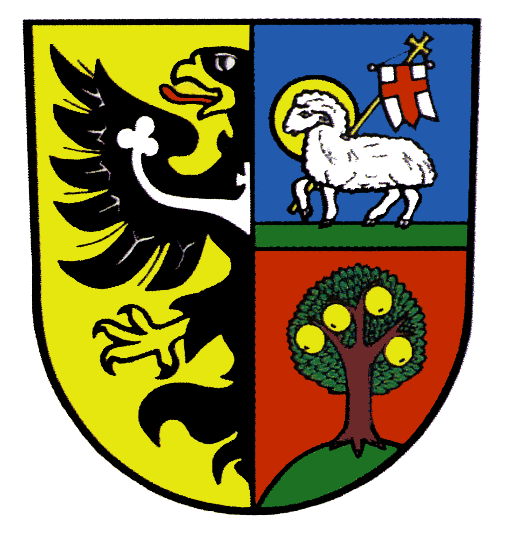
- Flag Coat of arms

- Location in the Czech Republic
- Coordinates: 49°34′36″N 18°45′53″E
- Country: Czech Republic
- Region: Moravian-Silesian
- District: Frýdek-Místek
- First mentioned: 1435

Government
  - Mayor: Kateřina Chybidziurová (SOCDEM)

Area
  - Total: 10.39 km^{2} (4.01 sq mi)
- Elevation: 386 m (1,266 ft)

Population (2026-01-01)
  - Total: 5,225
  - Density: 502.9/km^{2} (1,302/sq mi)
- Time zone: UTC+1 (CET)
  - Summer (DST): UTC+2 (CEST)
- Postal code: 739 91
- Website: www.jablunkov.cz

Jablunkov (Czech pronunciation: [ˈjabluŋkof]; Polish: Jabłonków, German: Jablunkau) is a town in Frýdek-Místek District in the Moravian-Silesian Region of the Czech Republic. It has about 5,200 inhabitants. The town is located at the confluence of the Olza and Lomná rivers.

Jablunkov has a significant Polish minority and is inhabited by a large number of Silesian Gorals.

== Geography ==
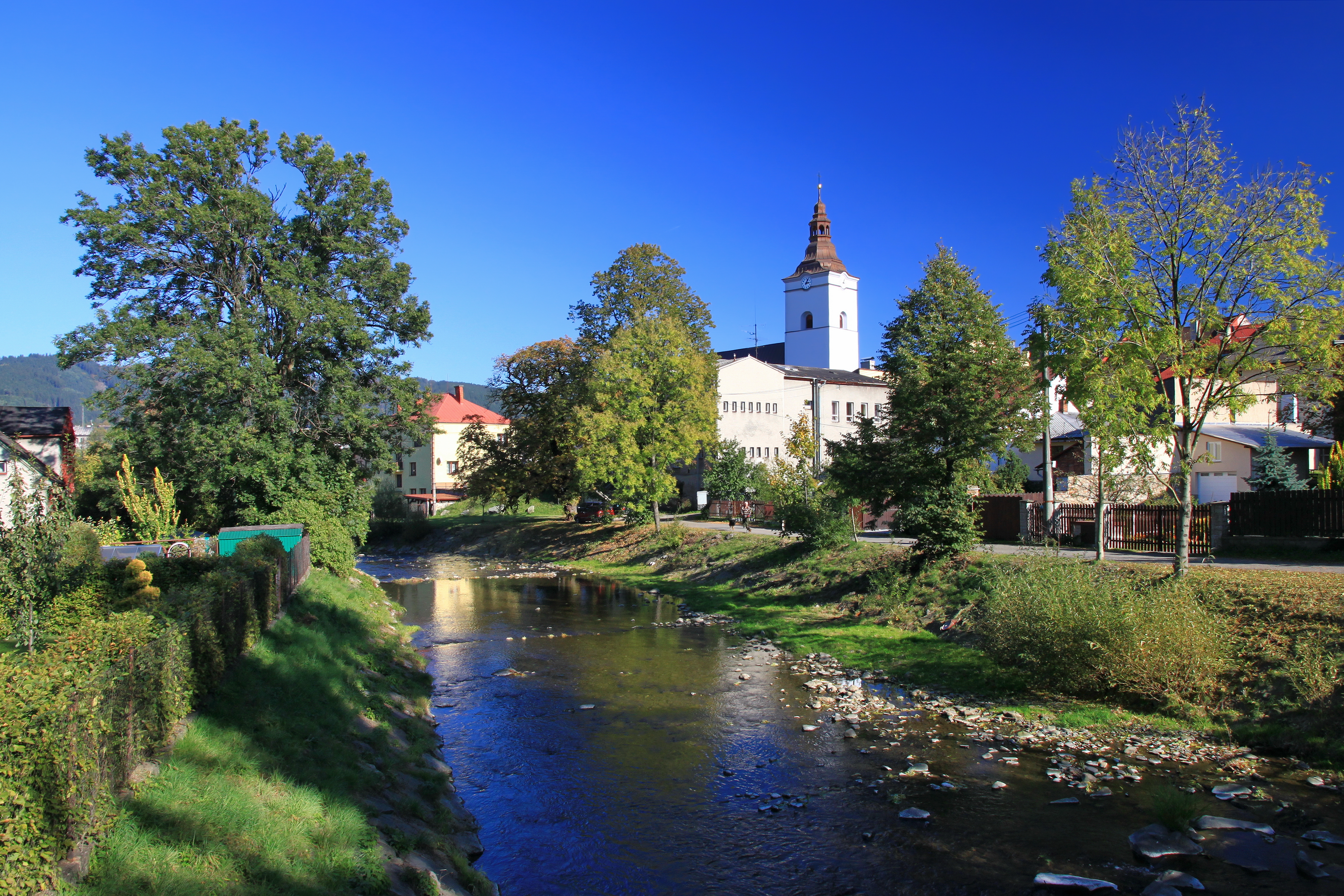
Lomná River in Jablunkov

Jablunkov is located about 31 kilometres (19 mi) southeast of Frýdek-Místek and 42 km (26 mi) southeast of Ostrava. It lies in the historical region of Cieszyn Silesia, and is the easternmost town of the country. It is located mainly in the Jablunkov Furrow lowland, but the municipal territory also extends to the Silesian Beskids on the east. The highest point is the hill Lysá at 544 m (1,785 ft) above sea level.

Jablunkov lies at the confluence of the Olza and Lomná rivers.

== History ==
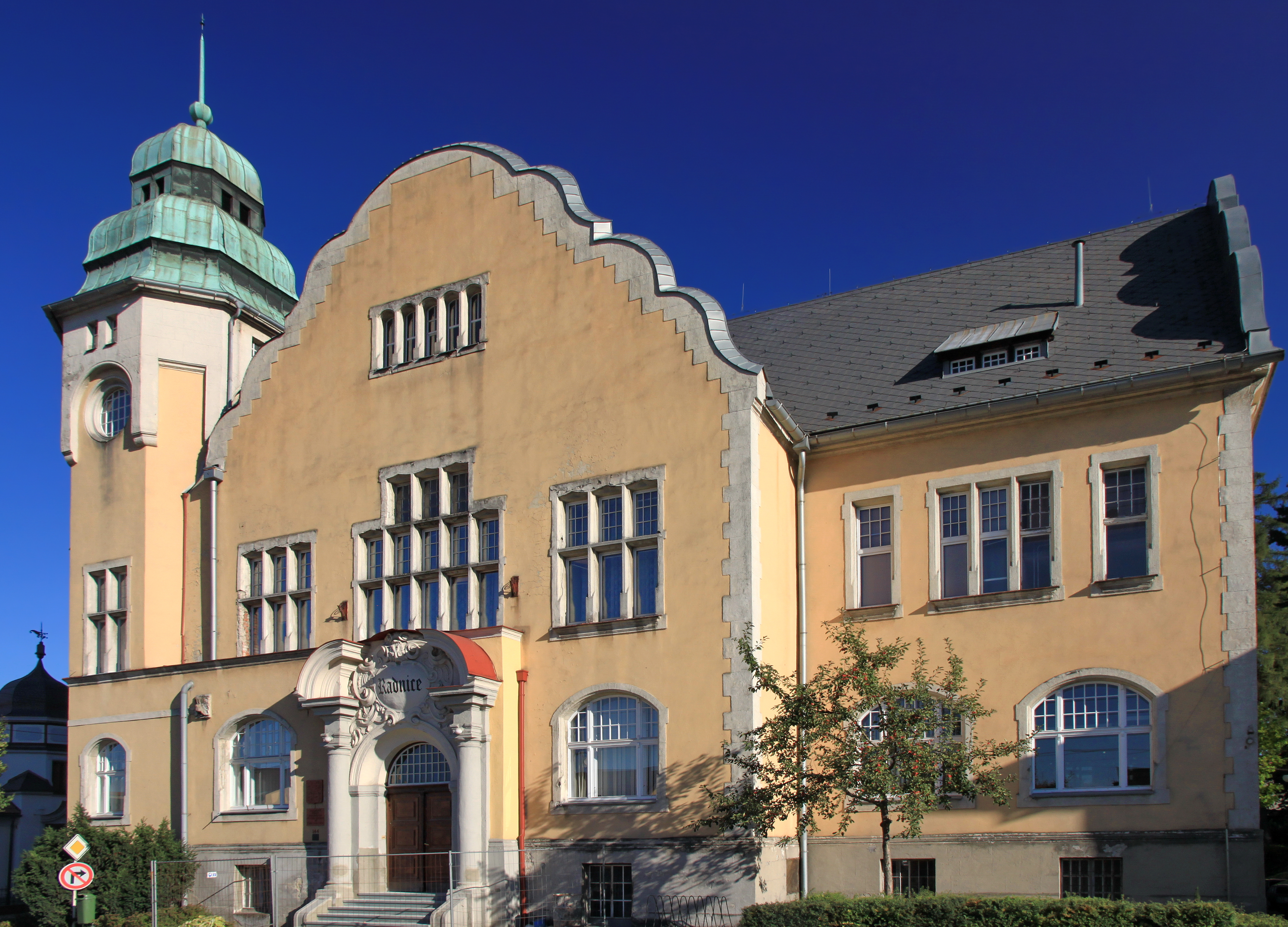
Town hall

According to historians, the predecessor of Jablunkov is to be found in the place where the present-day village of Hrádek or Nýdek is located. The first written mention of Jablunkov is from 1435. After the village was destroyed by a Hungarian raid at least in 1447, a new settlement emerged, and the previous settlement was renamed Old Jablunkov.

This settlement was primordially named Jablonka and as such it was mentioned as a seat of a Catholic parish in the register of Peter's Pence payment from 1447 among 50 parishes of Teschen deanery. Politically it belonged to the Duchy of Teschen, a fee of the Kingdom of Bohemia which was since 1526 a part of the Habsburg monarchy. In 1560 Wenceslaus III Adam, Duke of Cieszyn, granted Jablunkov town privileges. It continuously developed and in 1596 it had a mayor and a town council.

The town profited from its location on an ancient trade route going from the Mediterranean Sea to the Baltic Sea. The route was used by merchants of ancient Rome; frequent discoveries of Roman coins confirm that. Important trading routes to Kraków (north) and to Upper Hungary (east) also run through the town. It became more and more important and also rich, as many citizens lived by trading. In the 1640s it had 750 inhabitants, together with a suburb and the village of Písečná. In the 18th century most of citizens worked in trade, craftsmanship and farming. At the end of the 19th century, many new buildings were built. A new Art Nouveau town hall was built in 1905.

After Revolutions of 1848 in the Austrian Empire a modern municipal division was introduced in the re-established Austrian Silesia. The town became a seat of a legal district in the political district of Cieszyn. According to the censuses conducted in 1880–1910 the population of the municipality grew from 2,988 in 1880 to 3,459 in 1910 with the majority being native Polish-speakers (dropping from 89.4% in 1880 to 84.4% in 1910) accompanied by German-speaking minority (growing from 9.2% in 1880 to 14.1% in 1910) and Czech-speaking people (at most 57 or 1.5% in 1910). In terms of religion in 1910 the majority were Roman Catholics (88.5%), followed by Protestants (9.2%), Jews (90 or 2.3%) and 2 people adhering to another faiths.

After World War I, Polish–Czechoslovak War and the division of Cieszyn Silesia in 1920, it became a part of Czechoslovakia. Following the Munich Agreement, in October 1938 together with the Trans-Olza region it was annexed by Poland, administratively adjoined to Cieszyn County of Silesian Voivodeship. It was then annexed by Nazi Germany at the beginning of World War II. After the war it was restored to Czechoslovakia.

An old monastery of the Order of Saint Elisabeth with a hospital was built in 1853–1855, a chapel was added in 1861. It was located near the Olza River and was frequently flooded. A decision was taken to build a new one. The construction started in 1928 and it began operating in 1932. In 1948, the monastery and its properties were seized by the Communists, who forbade the further induction of new sisters. Former Elizabethan sisters were ordered to work in a state farm with cattle. In 1989, after the fall of communism, it was returned to the Elizabethan sisters. The monastery in Jablunkov is one of only three Elizabethan monasteries in the Czech Republic, the other two being in Prague and Brno.

== Demographics ==
According to the 2021 Census, Polish minority makes up 16.4% of the population.

Historical population

Year	Pop.	±%
1869	2,659	—
1880	2,988	+12.4%
1890	3,032	+1.5%
1900	3,068	+1.2%
1910	3,459	+12.7%

Year	Pop.	±%
1921	3,437	−0.6%
1930	3,778	+9.9%
1950	4,210	+11.4%
1961	4,283	+1.7%
1970	4,828	+12.7%

Year	Pop.	±%
1980	5,169	+7.1%
1991	5,788	+12.0%
2001	5,934	+2.5%
2011	5,732	−3.4%
2021	5,307	−7.4%

Source: Censuses

== Economy ==
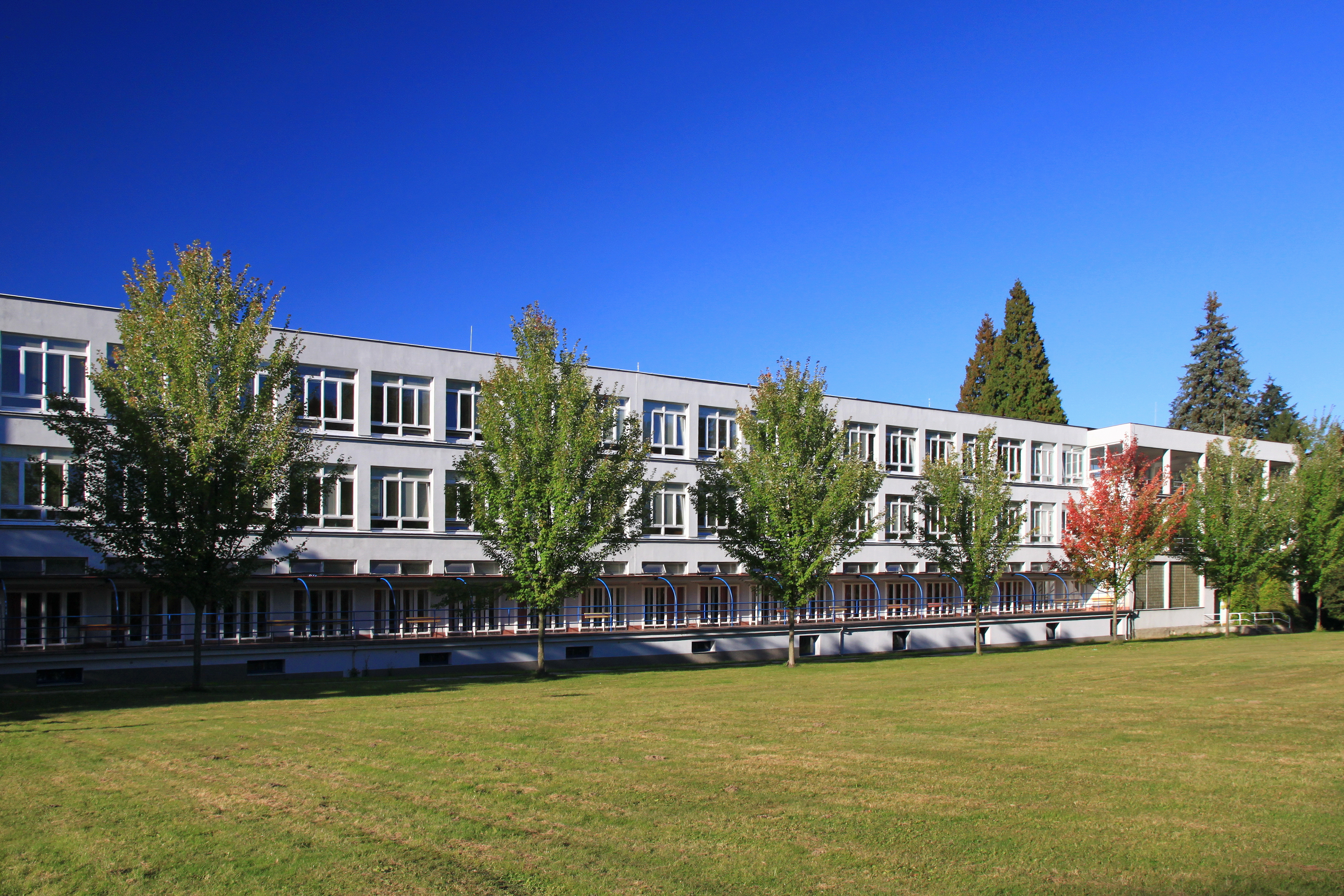
The sanatorium

There is a lung sanatorium in Jablunkov.

== Transport ==
The I/68 road (part of the European route E75), which connects the D48 motorway with the Czech–Slovak border in Mosty u Jablunkova, runs through Jablunkov.

The railway line Ostrava–Mosty u Jablunkova passes through the municipal territory, but there is no train station. The town is served by the station in neighbouring Návsí.

== Culture ==
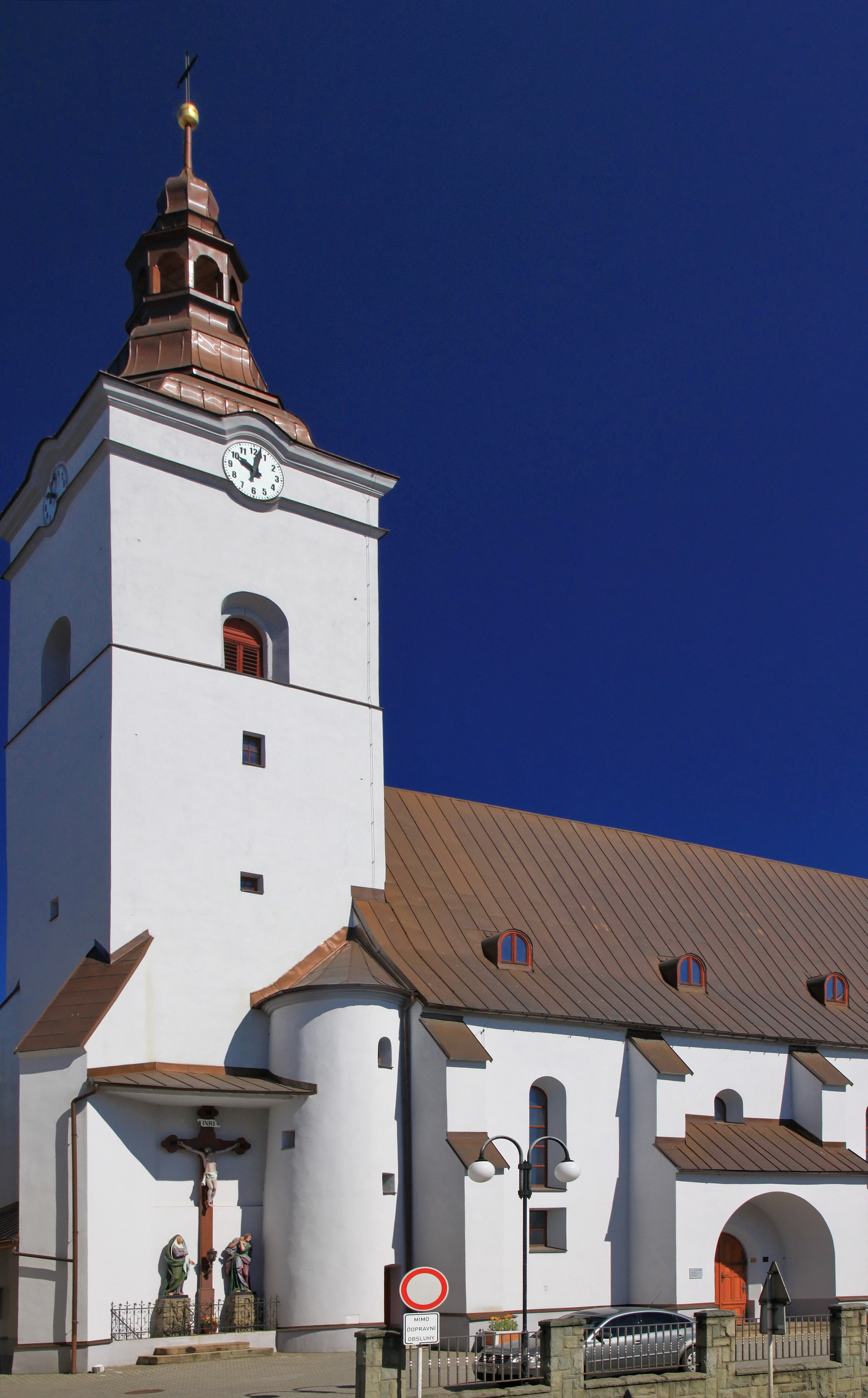
Church of Corpus Christi

Jablunkov is home to an ethnographic group known as Silesian Gorals. The most popular cultural event is the annual Gorolski Święto (literally "Goral's Festival"). It organised every year since 1947 by the Polish Cultural and Educational Union and is the second oldest folklore festival in the Czech Republic. It is a showcase of local Polish folklore and traditions that attracts visitors from all of Europe.

== Sights ==
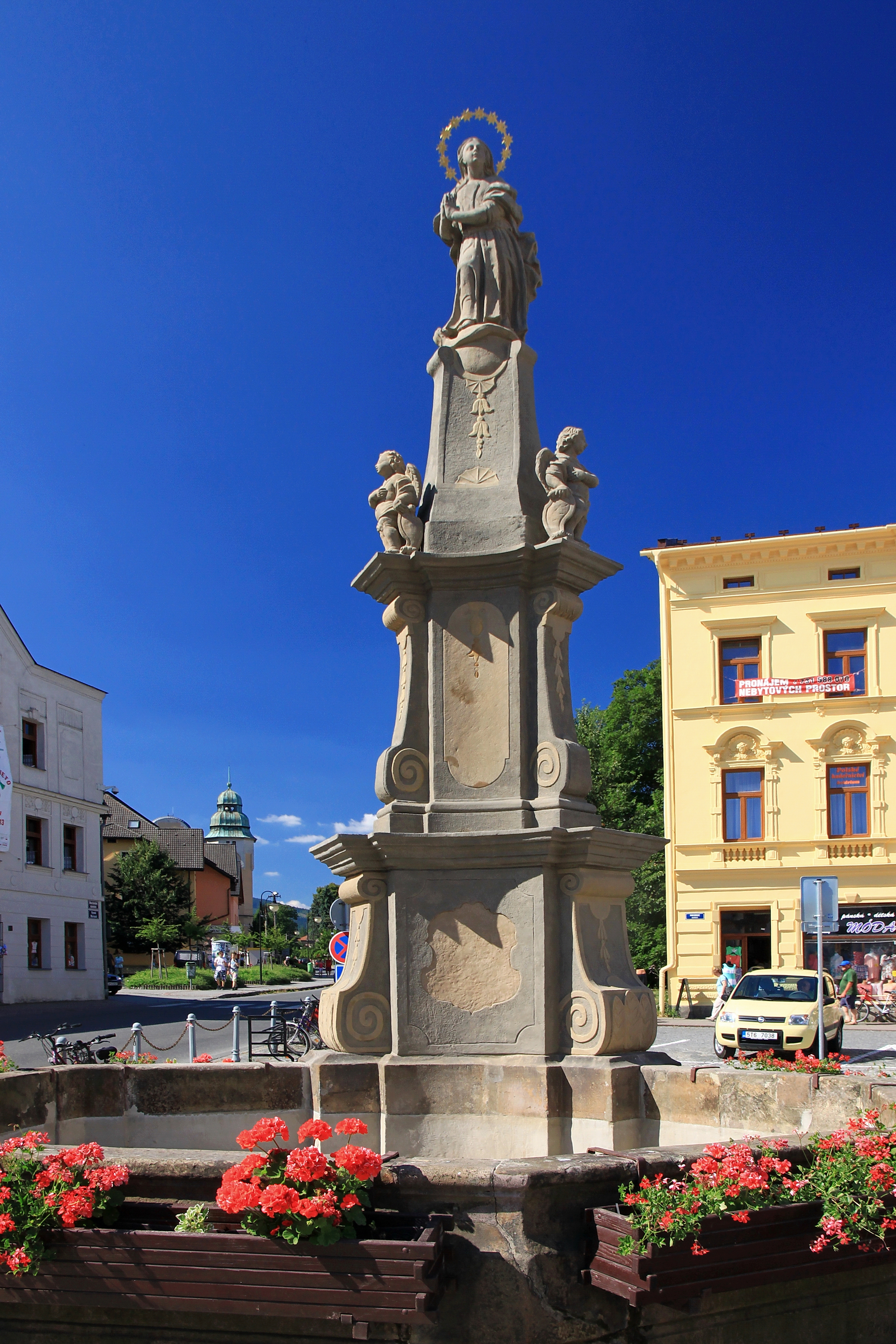
Fountain with statue of the Immaculate Virgin Mary

The Church of Corpus Christi was built in the Renaissance and early Baroque styles in 1620, but it has a late Gothic core. The current appearance of this Roman Catholic church is a result of neo-Gothic reconstruction.

Other important landmarks are the historic town square with a fountain and statue of the Virgin Mary from 1655, and the Elizabethan Monastery built in 1928–1932.

The sanatorium building was built in 1933–1935 and is a valuable landmark of modern architecture. It is surrounded by a park with an arboretum founded in 1924, most species were added in 1937. After its completion in 1938 it contained about a thousand species, varieties and forms of woody plants, of which 400 taxa of conifers. Today it has more than 500 species of trees and shrubs. Several sculptures created by Vincenc Makovský and Jan Tříska are also located in the park.

== Notable people ==
- Oskar Zawisza (1878–1933), Polish priest and composer
- Rudolf Paszek (1894–1969), Polish teacher and politician; mayor of Jablunkov in 1932–1938
- Karol Piegza (1899–1988), Polish writer and folklorist; lived and died here
- Otto Schneid (1900–1974), Austrian-Israeli art historian and writer
- Jiří Drahoš (born 1949), physical chemist and politician

== Twin towns – sister cities ==
Jablunkov is twinned with:

- Gogolin, Poland
- Kysucké Nové Mesto, Slovakia
- Siemianowice Śląskie, Poland
- Tiachiv, Ukraine
- Wisła, Poland
