= Paweł Kubisz =

Polish writer (1907–1968)

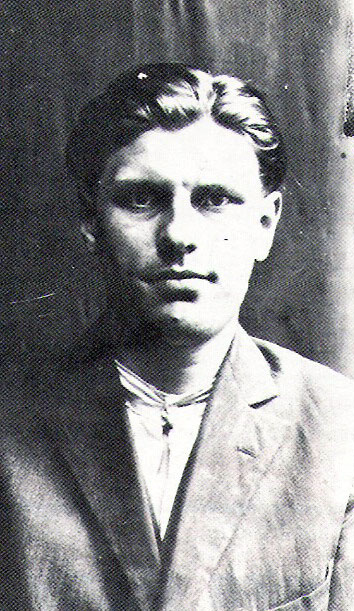
- Paweł Kubisz in 1928
- Born: 12 May 1907; Końska, Austria-Hungary
- Died: 19 August 1968 (aged 61); Český Těšín, Czechoslovakia
- Citizenship: Czechoslovak
- Occupations: Poet, writer, activist
- Writing career
- Language: Polish, Cieszyn Silesian dialect
- Notable work: Przednówek

Paweł Kubisz (12 May 1907 – 19 August 1968) was a Polish poet, writer, journalist, and activist. He was one of the most important poets from the Trans-Olza region of Cieszyn Silesia.

== Biography ==
Kubisz was born to a poor worker's family in the village of Końska. He attended pedagogic schools in Cieszyn-Bobrek and Ostrzeszów but didn't finish either, the latter due to the poems written about school's pedagogues. Young Kubisz was influenced mostly by the work of Stefan Żeromski and his works about poor masses. As a student he published his works in various press in Poland. Compiled together they were published as his debut poetry collection Kajdany i róże (Shackles and Roses) in 1927 in Fryštát.

On 17 April 1928 he was arrested by Czech authorities in his parents' house in Końska and on 6 November 1928 sentenced for 13 months in jail for alleged transport of illegal literature to Slovakia and conspiring against the Czechoslovak Republic. (Note: Some sources give 1927 as a year of his arrest and sentence.) The arrest during the time of investigation of his case was included in those 13 months. He spent his sentence in jail in Olomouc. After his release he cooperated with Zaranie Śląskie magazine published in Cieszyn and became a secretary of the Polish People's Party in Czechoslovakia (Stronnictwo Ludowe). In 1937 he became a chairman of newly founded Śląski Związek Literacko-Artystyczny (Silesian Literary-Artistic Association) and founded Sztorcem magazine, of which only three issues appeared. Sztorcem was published in Czeski Cieszyn and adopted critical stances against the Czechoslovak government and the communist movement. Kubisz worked also as a correspondent and spent three years in East Prussia, Lithuania and Latvia.

In 1937 Kubisz published his most important work Przednówek, poetry collection written in Cieszyn Silesian dialect with illustrations by artist Franciszek Świder. It was immediately labelled as a literary sensation and was reviewed more than 100 times by literary critics in Poland and Czechoslovakia, even German and Slovak critics reviewed it. Czech critics compared Przednówek to Slezské písně by Czech poet Petr Bezruč. Polish literary critic Zdzisław Hierowski said of his work:

The work is even more valuable, because it shows peasant and worker not only in suffering but also in the fight, not only in defeat but also in the rebellion full of hope, opening in the perspective a dawn of new times.

— Zdzisław Hierowski

After outbreak of World War II, in 1940 he was arrested by Gestapo and jailed in Cieszyn. Eventually released he went in 1941 to the General Government where managed to contact Polish resistance underground press and Bataliony Chłopskie (Peasants' Battalions) resistance movement. In 1944 he was arrested again by German Nazi authorities and jailed in the Montelupich Prison in Kraków.

After the war, Kubisz was awarded the State Literary Award (Państwowa Nagroda Literacka) by the Polish government in exile, published his works for some time in Polish press in Poland and eventually returned to Trans-Olza.

Kubisz was an active organizer of Polish literary and community life in Trans-Olza in the late 1940s and 1950s. He was one of the co-founders of PZKO (The Polish Cultural and Educational Union), the chairman of its newly founded Literary-Artistic Section (Sekcja Literacko-Artystyczna) and the first editor-in-chief of Zwrot magazine from 1949 to 1958.

In 1953 he published the poetry book Rapsod o Oszeldzie (Rhapsody about Oszelda) with illustrations by artists Rudolf Żebrok and Franciszek Świder. The book is centered around Paweł Oszelda, real historical person with largest influence on Kubisz. Oszelda was a Polish national activist from Niebory, leader of a peasants' rebellion against landlords in 1848.

In 1958 he was fired from his position of editor-in-chief of Zwrot and expelled from PZKO and the public life, he was also banned from publishing. He was accused by the Communists of alleged nationalist and "individualist" stances. Kubisz began working in Třinec Iron and Steel Works in Třinec as a worker. Struck by a motorcycle in a road accident he fell ill and was granted the disability pension. All these events made him disillusioned and closed up in himself. Kubisz died on 19 August 1968 in Český Těšín.

Kubisz wrote his works in Cieszyn Silesian dialect and in literary Polish. His poetry can be characterized as left-wing and rebellious, concerned mainly with the situation of the disadvantaged and workers of Cieszyn Silesia. His rebellious nature can be seen in his works, where he calls for social and national revolution. Kubisz recognized the class character of the national oppression of Polish people. He was always on the side of the poor, the laborers, peasants and metalworkers, and criticized privileged classes, the clergy, nobility, lawyers and doctors. Kubisz was rebellious in nature, always in conflict with someone. He often identified himself with characters from his writings, including Paweł Oszelda. His works are full of bitterness and pain.

A fragment from Co to młody gorol prawił, jak sie mu na śmierć niosło... (What a Young Goral Said When He Went to Death) from Przednówek poetry collection is typical for Kubisz's heroic style:

Harshly, forcefully, unremittingly -
I would like to be strident in anger,
I would like to rebel, to swear
In the chill, in the pain; shrink the words!

In a shattering of my soul,
Smash everything into no-memory,
Smash to pieces, destroy, and to tear –
Put the last feelings down into nothing!

— Paweł Kubisz

== Works ==
- Kajdany i róże (1927) – poetry collection
- Przednówek (1937, 1946) – poetry collection
- Pod Godulą w skałach skryte (1948) – poetry book
- Opowieść wydziedziczonych (1949) – poetic drama
- Rapsod o Oszeldzie (1953) – poetry book
- Zaszuwierzóny świat (1972) – short stories collection
- Aria z zaplutej trumny (or Dukaty z rulonu cierpkich lat) – unfinished and unpublished

== Literature ==
- Danel, Robert (1972). "Wstęp". In Paweł Kubisz (ed.). Zaszuwierzóny świat. Ostrava: Profil. pp. 5–19. OCLC 42123401.
- Długajczyk, Edward (1993). Tajny front na granicy cieszyńskiej. Wywiad i dywersja w latach 1919-1939. Katowice: Śląsk. pp. 45–50. ISBN 83-85831-03-7.
- Hierowski, Zdzisław (1947). 25 lat literatury na Śląsku 1920-1945. Katowice, Wrocław: Wydawnictwa Instytutu Śląskiego. OCLC 69489660.
- Kaszper, Kazimierz (2007-05-12). "Paweł Kubisz, trybun zaolziańskiego ludu". Głos Ludu. p. 3.
- Kaszper, Kazimierz (2007-05-15). "Niepokorne rozliczeniowe wiersze Pawła Kubisza". Głos Ludu. p. 5.
- Kubisz, Paweł (1937). Przednówek. Český Těšín: Śląski Związek Literacko-Artystyczny w Czechosłowacji. OCLC 85599099.
- Málková, Iva; Urbanová, Svatava (2001). Literární slovník severní Moravy a Slezska (1945-2000). Olomouc: Votobia. ISBN 80-7198-515-5.
- Martinek, Libor (2020). Paweł Kubisz. Wrocław: ATUT. ISBN 978-83-7977-507-1.
- Radłowska-Obrusnik, Martyna; Toboła, Otylia (1997). Leksykon PZKO. Český Těšín: Zarząd Główny PZKO. OCLC 189531468.
- Sikora, Władysław (1993). Pisarze Zaolzia. Český Těšín: Wydawnictwo Olza przy Radzie Polaków. OCLC 233485106.
- Zahradnik, Stanisław; Marek Ryczkowski (1992). Korzenie Zaolzia. Warsaw, Prague, Třinec: PAI-press. OCLC 177389723.
- Zahradnik, Stanisław (1999). "Poprzednicy Zwrotu". Zwrot: 5–6.

Media offices
Preceded by -	Editor-in-chief of Zwrot; 1949–1958	Succeeded by Tadeusz Siwek
