= Władysław Młynek =

Polish Czech teacher, writer and poet

- Born: 6 June 1930; Hrádek, Czechoslovakia
- Died: 1 December 1997 (aged 67); Návsí, Czech Republic
- Resting place: Návsí
- Occupations: Educator, poet, writer
- Children: Halina Mlynkova
- Writing career
- Language: Polish, Cieszyn Silesian dialect
- Notable works: Śpiywy zza Olzy, Śpiewające zbocza

Władysław Młynek (6 June 1930 – 1 December 1997) was a Polish Czech teacher, writer and poet.

== Biography ==
Młynek was born on 6 June 1930 in Hrádek. He was the son of Jan Młynek, a social activist. He attended Polish elementary school in Hrádek and later a Polish Gymnasium in Český Těšín where he expressed his interest about the poetry of Adam Mickiewicz. Młynek then worked as a teacher in Polish schools in Trans-Olza – in Třinec, Hnojník, Milíkov, Bukovec and at Kamenitý hill in the Moravian-Silesian Beskids mountain range.

He set up and conducted many choirs in schools where he worked and was an art director of Gorol men's choir in Jablunkov from 1978, and art director of Gorolski Święto festival from 1983.

Młynek was an active member of several Polish organizations including the Stowarzyszenie Młodzieży Polskiej (Association of Polish Youth) and the PZKO (Polish Cultural and Educational Union) and was a chairman of the General Committee (ZG) of the PZKO from 1990 to 1993. He was also a member of many literary organizations and the editor-in-chief on Zwrot magazine from 1992 to 1993.

He wrote his poetry in literary Polish and also in Cieszyn Silesian dialect. His poetry often focuses on the life of the common people, mostly Gorals. The prose collection Śpiewające zbocza (Singing Slopes) is inspired by his teaching experience in a small mountain school at the Kamienity hill in the Beskids mountain range. Młynek maintained close relations with other Polish writers of Trans-Olza of that time, mostly Paweł Kubisz and Adam Wawrosz.

Władysław Młynek died suddenly on 1 December 1997 in Návsí, where he lived for most of his life. He is buried at local Protestant cemetery.

His daughter Halina is a singer.

== Works ==
His works were part of following anthologies:

- Mrowisko (1964)
- Zaprosiny do stołu (1978)
- Słowa i krajobrazy (1980)
- Suita zaolziańska (1985)
- Na cieszyńskiej ziemi (1985)
- Zaproszenie do źródła (1987)
- Samosiewy (1988)
- Z biegiem Olzy (1990)

He published the following works:

- Śpiywy zza Olzy (1983) (poetry)
- Śpiewające zbocza (1989) (prose)
- Droga przez siebie (1992) (poetry)

Cultural offices
| Preceded by Roman Suchanek | Chairman of the ZG PZKO; 1990–1993 | Succeeded by Jerzy Czap |
Media offices
| Preceded by Jan Rusnok | Editor-in-chief of Zwrot; 1992–1993 | Succeeded by Dorota Havlík |
