= Zwrot =

Polish magazine

- First issue of Zwrot
- Editor-in-chief: Halina Szczotka
- Categories: Magazine
- Frequency: Monthly
- Circulation: 1,600
- Publisher: PZKO
- First issue: 24 December 1949
- Country: Czech Republic
- Language: Polish
- Website: www.zwrot.cz
- ISSN: 0139-6277
- OCLC: 263605670

Zwrot, January 2007

Zwrot (meaning "The Term or The Phrase") is the main and largest Polish magazine in the Czech Republic, chief magazine of the Polish minority in the Czech Republic. It appears monthly, with a circulation of 1,600 (2019). Published by the PZKO (The Polish Cultural and Educational Union), it is financially supported by the Ministry of Culture of the Czech Republic. The editorial staff is housed in Český Těšín. The current editor-in-chief is Halina Szczotka.

== History ==
Since 2 March 1947 until 20 November 1949 Głos Ludu newspaper published monthly a literary section called Szyndzioły. In December 1949 this section was transformed into Zwrot magazine. The first issue of Zwrot appeared on 24 December 1949. The first logo of the magazine was designed by artist Rudolf Żebrok. Together with Franciszek Świder they were the first illustrators of Zwrot. Zwrot had from the beginning a literary character. Content includes historical studies, essays, poetry, prose, art, educational and community issues, and factual reports. The circulation of Zwrot was in the past far higher, but it is historically declining along with the demographic drop in the Polish population. From 1949 to 1967 it appeared in A4 format, from 1967 to 2006 in A5 format, and from 2007 it appears in A4 full-colour format.

== Circulation ==
Year	Circulation
1950	7,500
1967	4,600
1977	4,250
1999	2,100
2007	1,550
2010	1,700
2012	1,500
2019	1,600

== Editors-in-chief ==
- Paweł Kubisz (1949–1958)
- Tadeusz Siwek (1958–1964)
- Jan Rusnok (1964–1969)
- Tadeusz Chrząszcz (1970–1972)
- Eugeniusz Suchanek (1972–1976)
- Bronisław Bielan (1976–1979)
- Kazimierz Kaszper (1979–1981)
- Piotr Przeczek (1983–1990)
- Jan Rusnok (1990–1992)
- Władysław Młynek (1992–1993)
- Dorota Havlík (1993–1995)
- Elżbieta Stróżczyk (1995–2006)
- Kazimierz Kaszper (2007–2012)
- Halina Sikora-Szczotka (2012–2017)
- Izabela Kraus-Żur (2018)
- Halina Szczotka (2018–)

== See also ==
- List of magazines in the Czech Republic
