= Jasiczek =

Jasiczek is a Polish surname. Notable people with the surname include:

- Henryk Jasiczek (1919–1976), Polish journalist, poet, writer, and activist
- Michał Jasiczek (born 1994), Polish alpine skier
