= Hrádek (Frýdek-Místek District) =

Hrádek Gródek
- Municipality
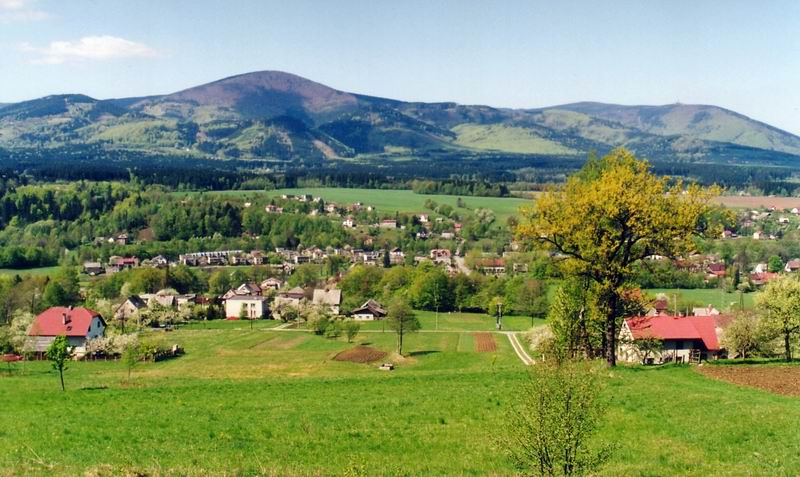
- General view

- Flag Coat of arms

- Location in the Czech Republic
- Coordinates: 49°37′0″N 18°44′14″E
- Country: Czech Republic
- Region: Moravian-Silesian
- District: Frýdek-Místek
- First mentioned: 1577

Area
  - Total: 9.77 km^{2} (3.77 sq mi)
- Elevation: 353 m (1,158 ft)

Population (2026-01-01)
  - Total: 1,908
  - Density: 195/km^{2} (506/sq mi)
- Time zone: UTC+1 (CET)
  - Summer (DST): UTC+2 (CEST)
- Postal code: 739 97
- Website: www.obechradek.cz

Hrádek (Czech pronunciation: [ˈɦraːdɛk]; Polish: Gródek, German: Grudek) is a municipality and village in Frýdek-Místek District in the Moravian-Silesian Region of the Czech Republic. It has about 1,900 inhabitants. The municipality has a significant Polish minority.

== Etymology ==
The name of the municipality is a diminutive form of the word hradiště in Czech and gród in Polish, meaning 'gord'.

== Geography ==
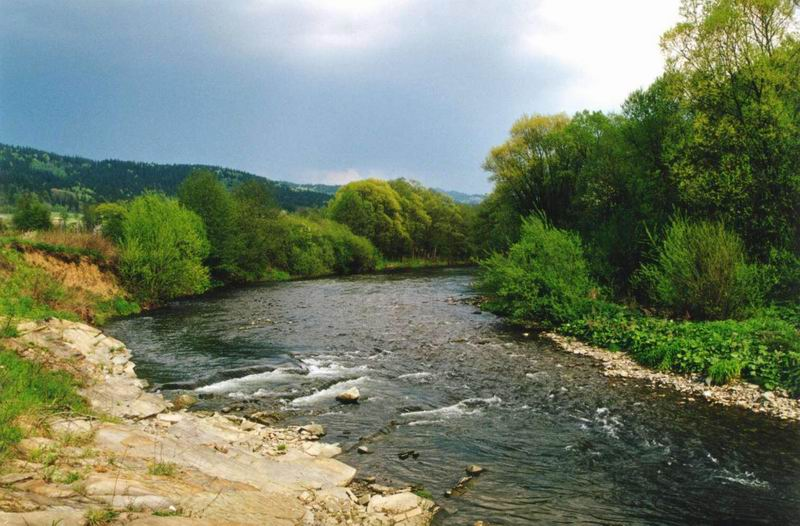
The Olza in the municipality

Hrádek is located about 27 kilometres (17 mi) east of Frýdek-Místek and 37 km (23 mi) southeast of Ostrava, in the historical region of Cieszyn Silesia. The western part of the municipality lies in the Jablunkov Furrow and the eastern part lies in the Silesian Beskids. The highest point is near the top of the mountain Loučka at 834 m (2,736 ft) above sea level. The Olza River flows through the municipality.

== History ==
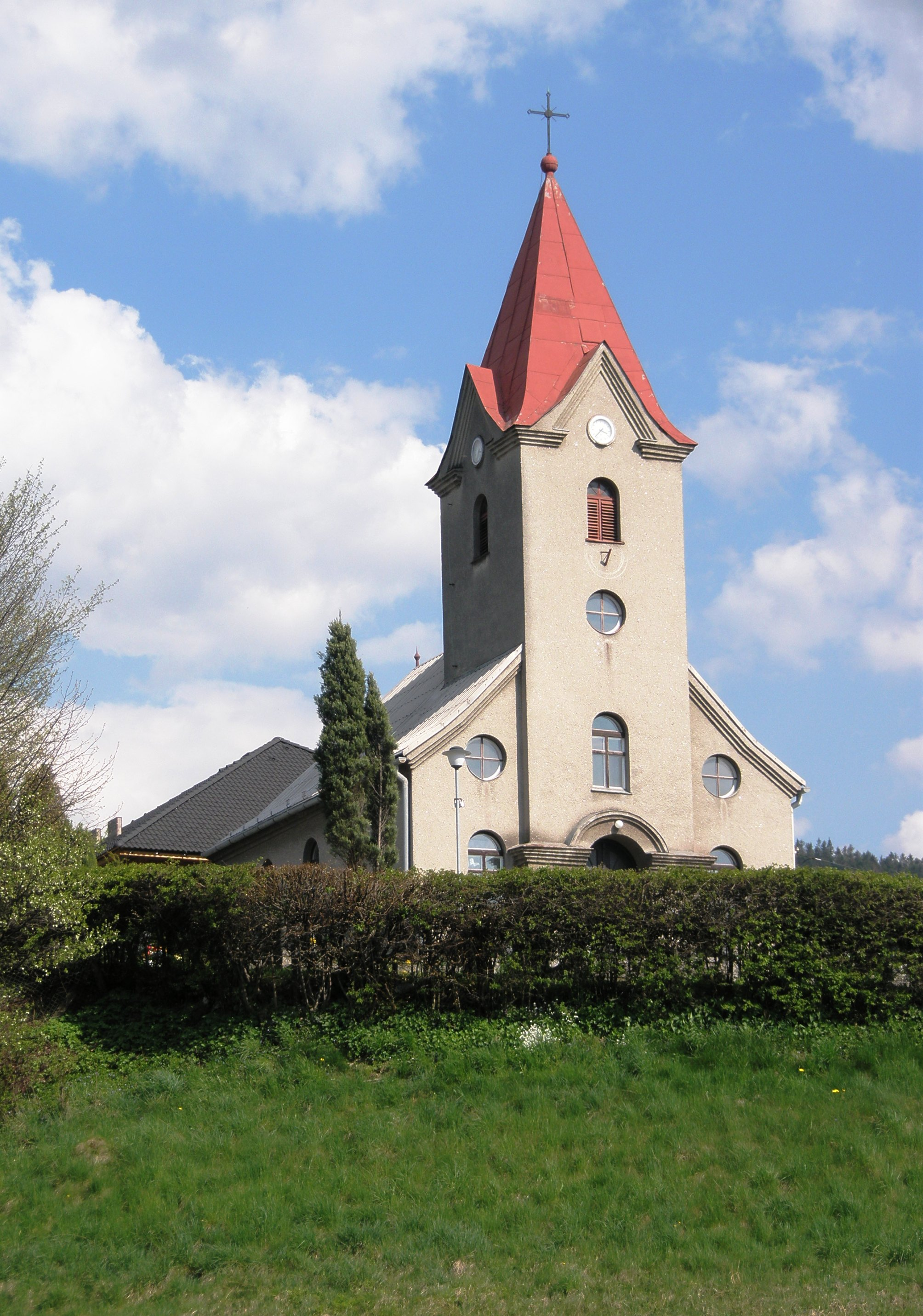
Lutheran church

The beginnings of Hrádek can be traced back to the first half of the 12th century, when a small fort was built on a trade route running through the Jablunkov Pass around 1119. A settlement named Jablunkov grew up around the fort. The small fort and the settlement were completely destroyed by the Hungarians in 1447. After these events, a new settlement was founded nearby and named New Jablunkov. In the area of Hrádek, the settlement was renewed and named Old Jablunkov. The first written mention of the village under the name Hrádek (written as Grudek) is from 1577. It belonged to the Duchy of Teschen.

Hrádek began to develop more rapidly at the turn of the 18th and 19th centuries, when about 900 people working mainly in agriculture lived there. The development was aided by the construction of the road in 1780 and the construction of the Košice–Bohumín Railway a hundred years later. After 1880, stone began to be quarried here. Its quarrying lasted until the outbreak of World War I.

After Revolutions of 1848 in the Austrian Empire, a modern municipal division was introduced in the re-established Austrian Silesia. The village as a municipality was subscribed to the political district of Cieszyn and the legal district of Jablunkov. According to the censuses conducted in 1880–1910, the population of the municipality grew from 798 in 1880 to 886 in 1910 with the majority being native Polish-speakers (between 98.1% and 100%) accompanied by Czech-speaking (at most 0.7% in 1910) and German-speaking people (at most 0.6% in 1910). In terms of religion in 1910 the majority were Protestants (74.9%), followed by Roman Catholics (24.9%) and Jews (2 people).

After World War I, Polish–Czechoslovak War and the division of Cieszyn Silesia in 1920, Hrádek became a part of Czechoslovakia. Following the Munich Agreement, in October 1938 together with the Trans-Olza region it was annexed by Poland, administratively adjoined to Cieszyn County of Silesian Voivodeship. The municipality was then annexed by Nazi Germany at the beginning of World War II. After the war it was restored to Czechoslovakia.

From 1980 to 1990, Hrádek was a municipal part of Jablunkov.

== Demographics ==
According to the 2021 Census, Polish minority makes up 30.2% of the population.

Historical population

Year	Pop.	±%
1869	726	—
1880	798	+9.9%
1890	797	−0.1%
1900	882	+10.7%
1910	886	+0.5%

Year	Pop.	±%
1921	937	+5.8%
1930	1,202	+28.3%
1950	1,201	−0.1%
1961	1,501	+25.0%
1970	1,516	+1.0%

Year	Pop.	±%
1980	1,669	+10.1%
1991	1,682	+0.8%
2001	1,756	+4.4%
2011	1,768	+0.7%
2021	1,794	+1.5%

Source: Censuses

== Transport ==
The I/68 road (part of the European route E75), which connects the D48 motorway with the Czech–Slovak border in Mosty u Jablunkova, runs through the municipality.

Hrádek is located on the railway line Ostrava–Mosty u Jablunkova.

== Sights ==
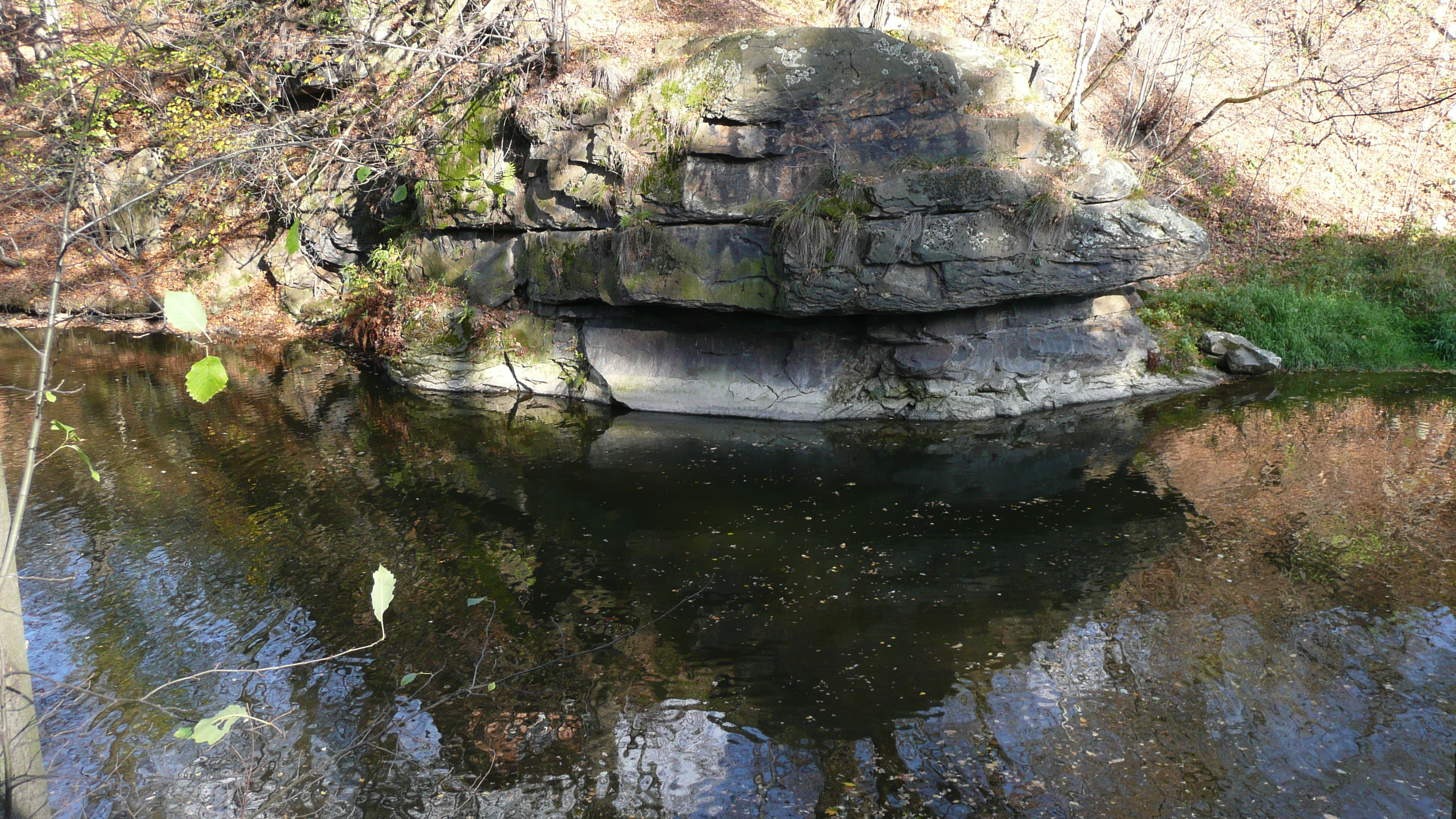
Belko Rock

There are no protected cultural monuments in the municipality. The main landmark is the Lutheran church.

Belko Rock is a nature landmark above the Olza River. This rock formation was the site of a small fort. According to local legend, it was the home of the infamous knight Belko, who plundered merchants and murdered people, and committed suicide when his conscience overwhelmed him.

== Notable people ==
- Władysław Młynek (1930–1997), Polish poet and writer

== Twin towns – sister cities ==
Hrádek is twinned with:

- Čierne, Slovakia
- Radoľa, Slovakia
- Skoczów, Poland
