= Kottingbrunn =

- Municipality
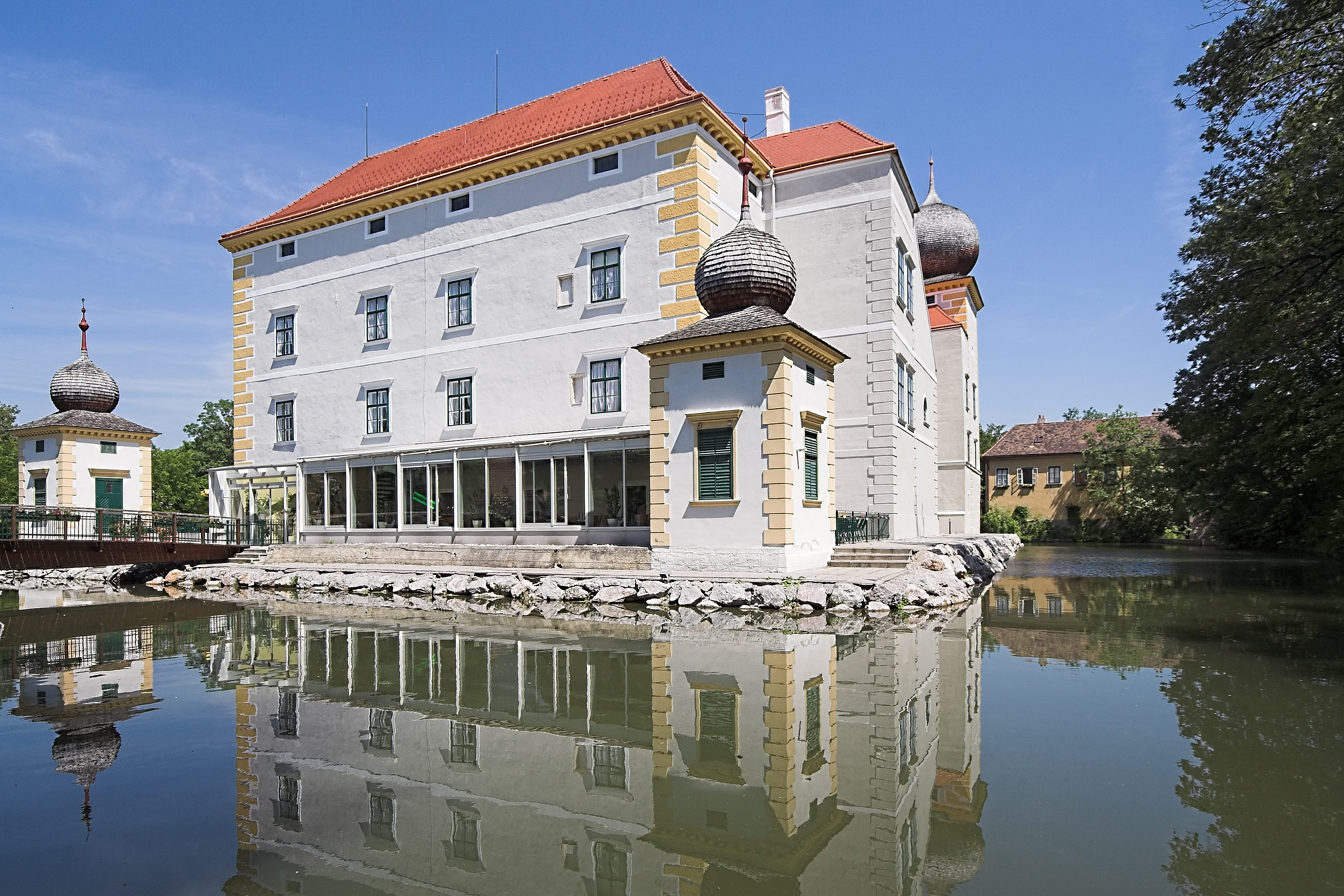
- Water palace in Kottingbrunn

- Coat of arms

- Location within Austria
- Coordinates: 47°57′07″N 16°13′45″E
- Country: Austria
- State: Lower Austria
- District: Baden

Government
  - Mayor: Christian Macho (ÖVP)

Area
  - Total: 11.61 km^{2} (4.48 sq mi)
- Elevation: 251 m (823 ft)

Population (2018-01-01)
  - Total: 7,417
  - Density: 638.8/km^{2} (1,655/sq mi)
- Time zone: UTC+1 (CET)
  - Summer (DST): UTC+2 (CEST)
- Postal code: 2542
- Area code: 02252
- Website: www.kottingbrunn.or.at

Kottingbrunn is a town in the district of Baden in Lower Austria in Austria.

== Population ==
Historical population
Year	Pop.	±%
1869	1,391	—
1880	1,584	+13.9%
1890	1,803	+13.8%
1900	1,920	+6.5%
1910	2,263	+17.9%
1923	2,315	+2.3%
1934	2,317	+0.1%
1939	2,608	+12.6%
1951	2,232	−14.4%
1961	2,506	+12.3%
1971	3,197	+27.6%
1981	3,999	+25.1%
1991	5,317	+33.0%
2001	6,589	+23.9%
2011	7,471	+13.4%
2015	7,419	−0.7%

== Notable people ==
- Henryk Jasiczek (1919–1976), Polish Czech journalist, poet and writer
