= Henryk Jasiczek =

Polish journalist, poet, writer, and activist

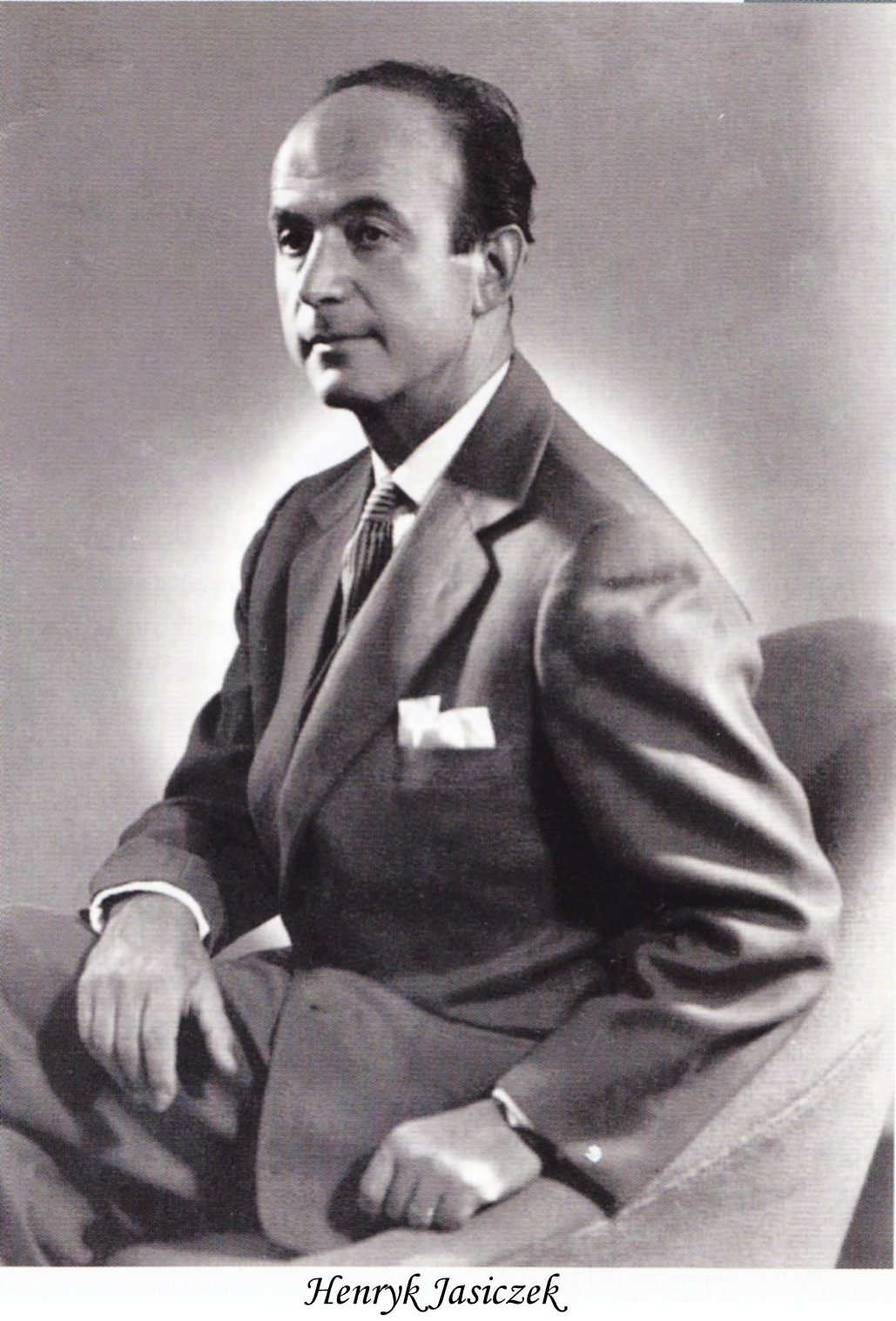
- Henryk Jasiczek
- Born: 2 March 1919; Kottingbrunn, Austria
- Died: 8 December 1976 (aged 57); Český Těšín, Czechoslovakia
- Resting place: Český Těšín
- Citizenship: Czechoslovak
- Occupations: Poet, writer, journalist
- Spouse: Maria Jasiczek
- Writing career
- Language: Polish

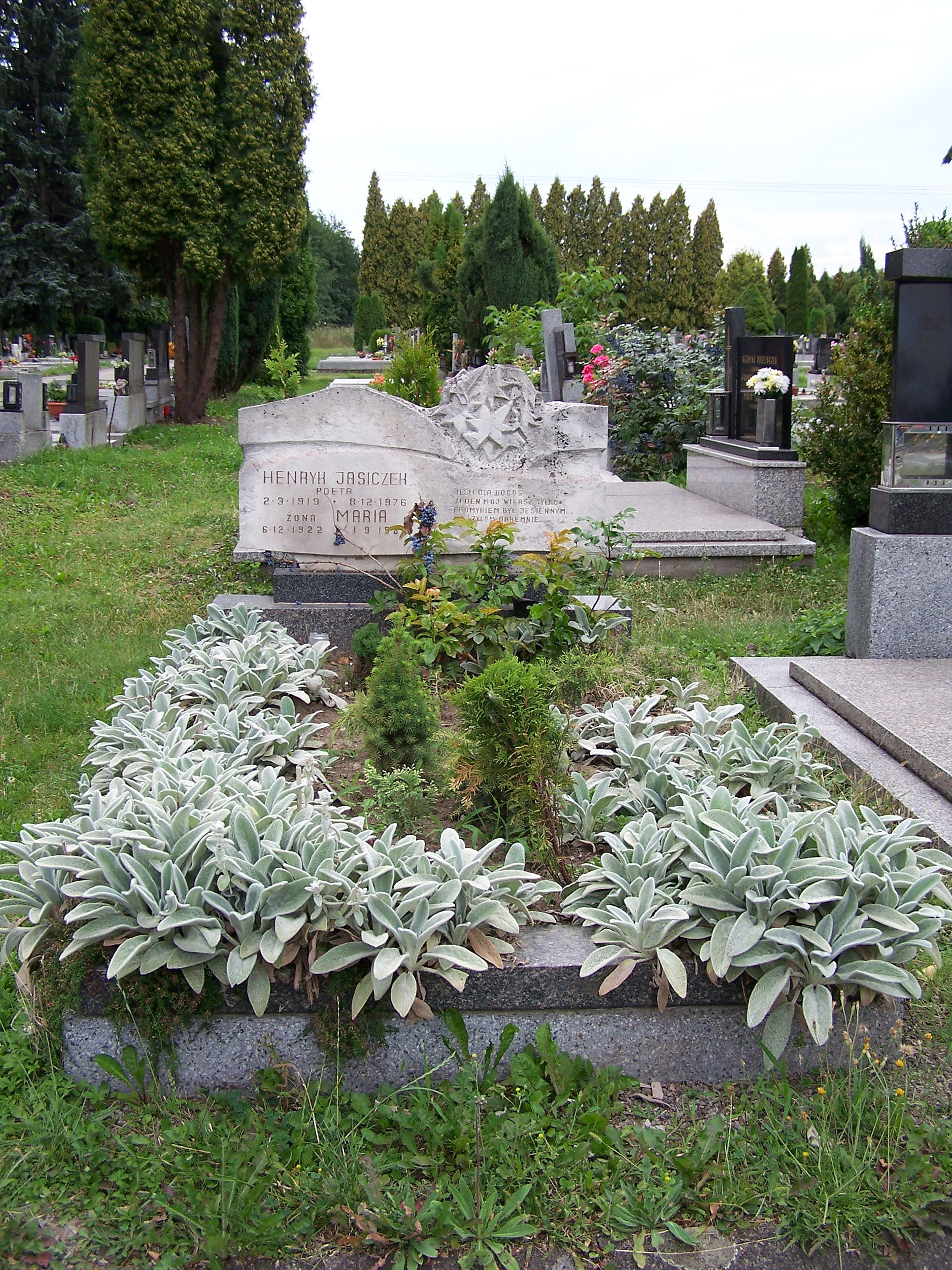
Grave of Henryk Jasiczek and his wife in Český Těšín. His own epitaph reads: If for someone a single poem of mine was just an autumn ray, I didn't live uselessly. (Note: Original in Polish: Jeśli dla kogoś jeden mój wiersz tylko promykiem był jesiennym, nie żyłem daremnie.)

Henryk Jasiczek (2 March 1919 – 8 December 1976) was a Polish Czech journalist, poet, writer, and activist. He is considered one of the most important writers from the Trans-Olza region after World War II and one of the most popular local Polish poets.

== Biography ==
Jasiczek was born in Kottingbrunn near Vienna, Austria as an extramarital child. He spent his childhood in Oldrzychowice near Třinec. Since 1934 he studied horticulture in Třinec, where, as later remembered, witnessed the worst forms of labour exploitation of workers. In 1936, he defended one apprentice who had been beaten by the supervisor and bashed the supervisor himself. In consequence he left and finished horticultural studies in Chrudim, only to work later for a gardener in Hradečno. In 1938 he came back to Trans-Olza but wasn't able to find a job. Since March 1939 Jasiczek worked in the Třinec Iron and Steel Works as a worker.

During World War II he was engaged in Polish leftist resistance, where he worked in the underground press and distributed illegal press under the pseudonym of Wiktor Raban. After the war he joined the Communist Party of Czechoslovakia and became editor-in-chief of Głos Ludu newspaper. He remained in this position until 1957. Jasiczek graduated from a journalism department of the Charles University in Prague in 1960. He contributed to Polish children magazines and to Zwrot, a Polish cultural and literary magazine. Jasiczek was also an active member of the Polish Cultural and Educational Union, where he directed its Literary-Artistic Section (SLA) from 1945 to 1968.

During the Prague Spring, Jasiczek firmly supported the reformist wing of the Communist Party. His stances and their public manifestations led to his expulsion from public life in May 1970. He was not permitted to publish anymore. Jasiczek spent the last years of his life in seclusion and was forced to work in the printing works as a proofreader with half of the usual salary. He died on 8 December 1976 in a hospital in Český Těšín. Communist authorities did not even allow his obituary to be printed. Henryk Jasiczek was exonerated in 1990.

Right after World War II his poetry focused on social issues. Eventually Jasiczek concentrated on folk and natural motives of regional nature. His lyric poetry is full of melancholy and appreciation of the natural beauties of his region, mostly the Beskids mountain ranges.

Jasiczek's adoration of natural beauties of his region, particularly the Beskids can be seen for example in Nie zdradzę (I Will not Betray) poem from Obuszkiem ciosane (Cut with Cudgel) poetry collection.

== Works ==
- Rozmowy z ciszą (1948) – poetry collection
- Pochwała życia (1952)
- Gwiazdy nad Beskidem (1953) – poetry collection
- Obuszkiem ciosane (1955) – poetry collection
- Jaśminowe noce (1959) – poetry collection
- Humoreski beskidzkie (1959) – prose
- Poetyckie pozdrowienia (1961) – poetry collection
- Morze Czarne jest błękitne (1961) – travel report
- Krásné jak housle (1962)
- Blizny pamięci (1963)
- Przywiozę ci krokodyla (1965) – travel report
- Pokus o smír (1967)
- Baj, baju z mojego kraju (1968) – poetry collection for children
- Zamyślenie (1969)
- Smuga cienia (1981) – posthumous selection of poetry
- Jak ten obłok (1990) – posthumous selection of poetry
- Wiersze (2006) – posthumous selection of poetry

== Notes ==
Media offices
Preceded by -	Editor-in-chief of Głos Ludu; 1945–1957	Succeeded by Jan Szurman
