= State Literary Award (Poland) =

Polish literary award

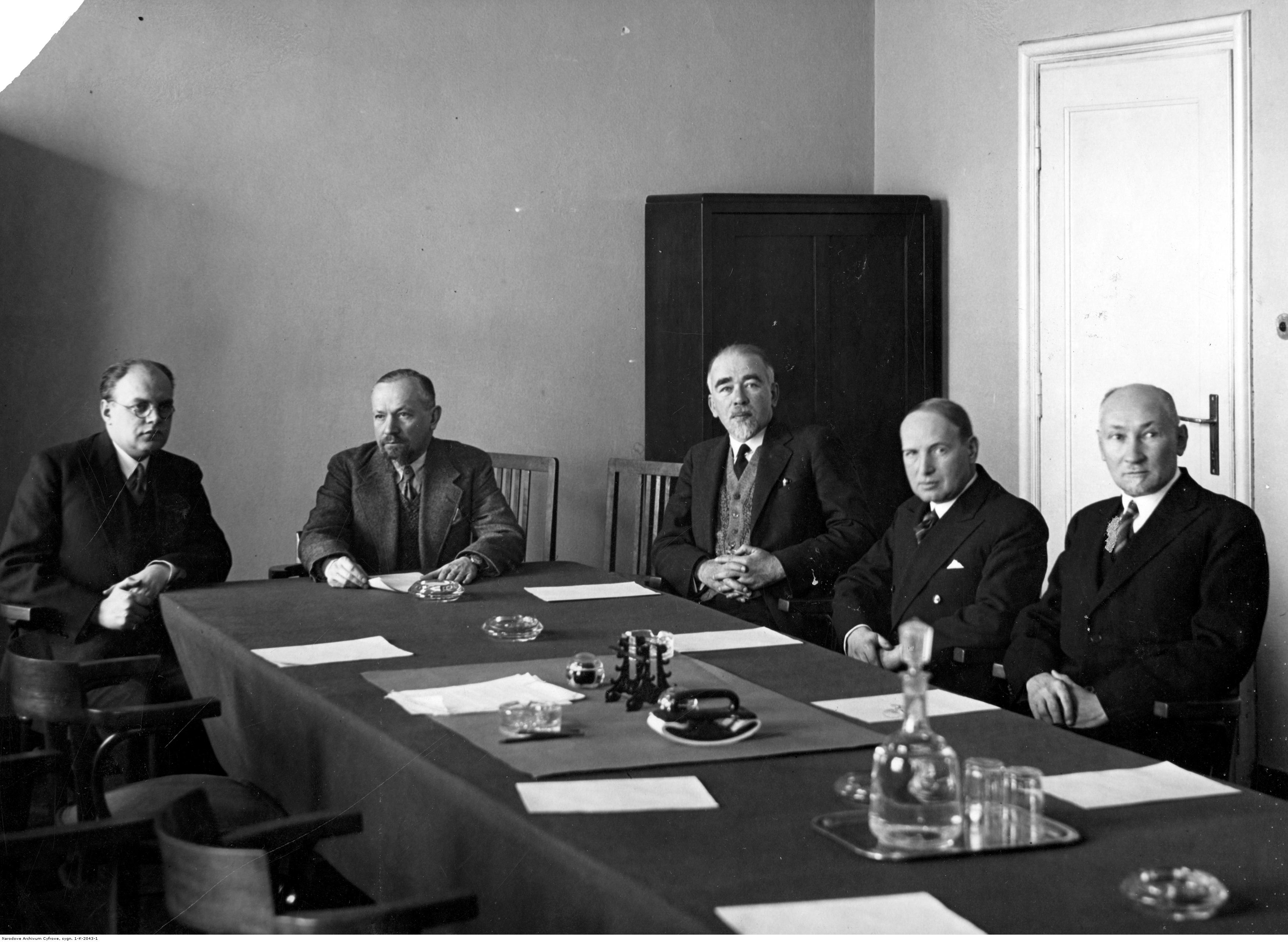
Members of the State Literary Award jury in 1935. From the left: Władysław Zawistowski, Leopold Staff, Józef Ujejski, Leon Pomirowski, Wincenty Rzymowski

The State Literary Award also known as Literary Award of the Minister of Religious Affairs was a Polish literature award during the interwar period. It was awarded starting in 1925 for a work published in the previous three years. The award was given by a five-person jury, consisting of three representatives from the largest creative unions, a critic, and a representative of the ministry, all chosen by the current Minister of Religious Affairs and Public Education.

In 1933, the award was modified to recognize an author's entire body of work, with special attention to the last five years. The monetary component of the award was gradually increased, reaching 20,000 PLN in 1930, while in 1925 it was only 5,000 PLN.

The first recipient of the award (18 January 1925) was Stefan Żeromski (for Wiatr od morza [The Wind from the Sea]). In later years, the award was presented in December. The last laureate of the award during the Second Polish Republic was Artur Górski, who was honored in December 1938 for his long-standing literary work.

The Minister of Religious Affairs and Public Education also awarded similar prizes in the fields of fine arts and music.

An award with a similar name (The Badge of the State Award in Literature, often colloquially referred to as the State Literary Award) was also awarded during the Polish People's Republic by the Ministry of Culture and National Heritage. It was divided into three levels.

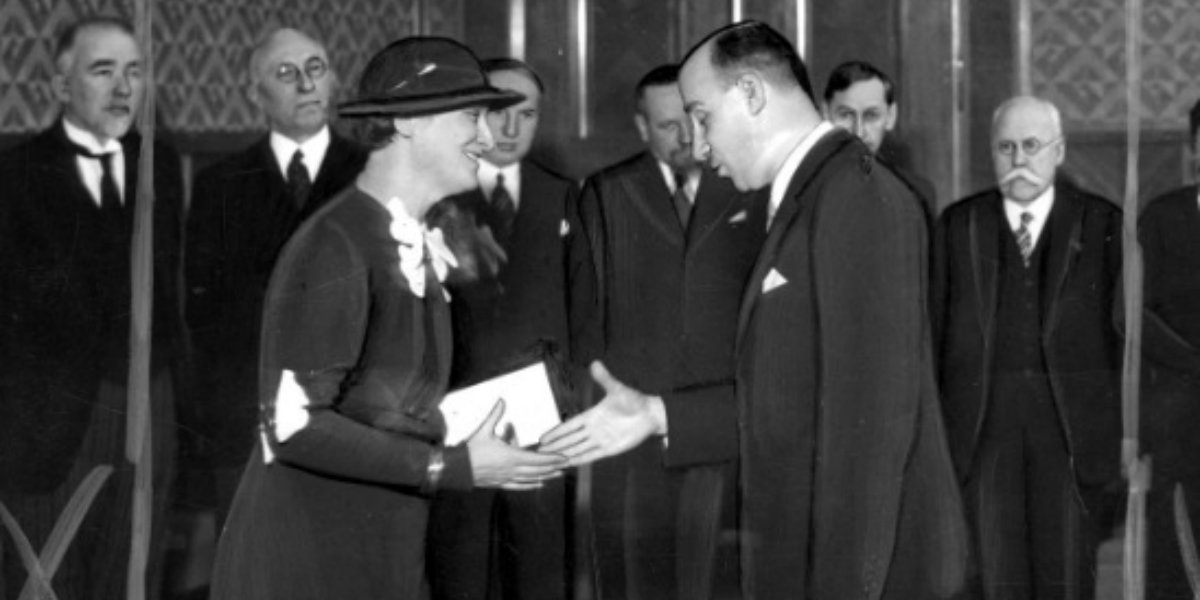
Presentation of the State Literary Award for 1934 to Kazimiera Iłłakowiczówna by the Minister of Religious Affairs and Public Education, Wacław Jędrzejewicz, in January 1935

== Recipients ==
- Stefan Żeromski (1925, for Wiatr od morza [The Wind from the Sea])
- Kornel Makuszyński (1926, for Wide is My Motherland)
- Leopold Staff (1927, for Ucho igielne [The Eye of the Needle])
- Juliusz Kaden-Bandrowski (1928, for the novellas Miasto mojej matki [The City of My Mother] and W cieniu zapomnianej olszyny [In the Shadow of the Forgotten Alder])
- Ferdynand Goetel (1929, for Serce lodów [The Heart of Ice])
- Jerzy Szaniawski (1930, for the play Adwokat i róże [The Lawyer and the Roses])
- Wacław Berent (1931, for biographical stories, especially Wywłaszczenie muz [Expropriation of the Muses])
- Karol Hubert Rostworowski (1932, for Niespodzianka [The Surprise])
- Maria Dąbrowska (1933, for Noce i dnie [Nights and Days])
- Kazimiera Iłłakowiczówna (1934)
- Zofia Nałkowska (1935, for The Frontier)
- Kazimierz Wierzyński (1936)
- Wacław Borowy (1937)
- Artur Górski (1938)
