= Głos (Czech Republic) =

- Special sport issue of Głos Ludu featuring Polonia Karwina, 16–17 July 1949
- Type: Newspaper
- Format: Compact
- Owner(s): Congress of Poles
- Publisher: Congress of Poles
- Editor-in-chief: Tomasz Wolff
- Founded: 1945
- Language: Polish
- Headquarters: Český Těšín
- Circulation: 5,000
- ISSN: 2570-8708
- OCLC number: 320471230
- Website: https://glos.live/

Głos (meaning The Voice; formerly Głos Ludu, meaning The Voice of People) is the main and largest Polish newspaper in the Czech Republic. It represents the Polish minority in the Czech Republic, especially the Trans-Olza region.

== History and profile ==
The first release of the Głos Ludu appeared on 9 June 1945, in Fryštát. It firstly appeared weekly, then two times a week, from April 1946 three times a week. The circulation in the 1960s was 12,000. The editorial staff moved from Fryštát to Český Těšín and later to Ostrava, and since 2003, has been housed in Český Těšín again. For 45 years, it was published by the Communist Party of Czechoslovakia, and since 1991 by the Congress of Poles. Since 2011 it is a member of the European Association of Daily Newspapers in Minority and Regional Languages.

Głos Ludu appeared on Tuesdays, Thursdays, and Saturdays until 2018.

Since 2018, the newspaper has been renamed to Głos and transformed to full-color format. It now appears on Tuesdays and Fridays with a circulation of 5,000. Published by the Congress of Poles, it is financially supported by the Ministry of Culture of the Czech Republic. The current editor-in-chief is Tomasz Wolff.

== Editors-in-chief ==
- Henryk Jasiczek (1945–1957)
- Jan Szurman (1958–1964)
- Tadeusz Siwek (1964–1969)
- Stanisław Kondziołka (1969–1986)
- Henryk Kiedroń (1986–1991)
- Marek Matuszyński (1991–1992)
- Marian Siedlaczek (1992–1994)
- Władysław Biłko (1994–2000)
- Henryka Bittmar (2000–2003)
- Danuta Branna (2003–2005)
- Beata Schönwald (2005–2008)
- Wojciech Trzcionka (2008–2010)
- Tomasz Wolff (2010–)
