= Polish minority in the Czech Republic =

Polish national minority in the Czech Republic

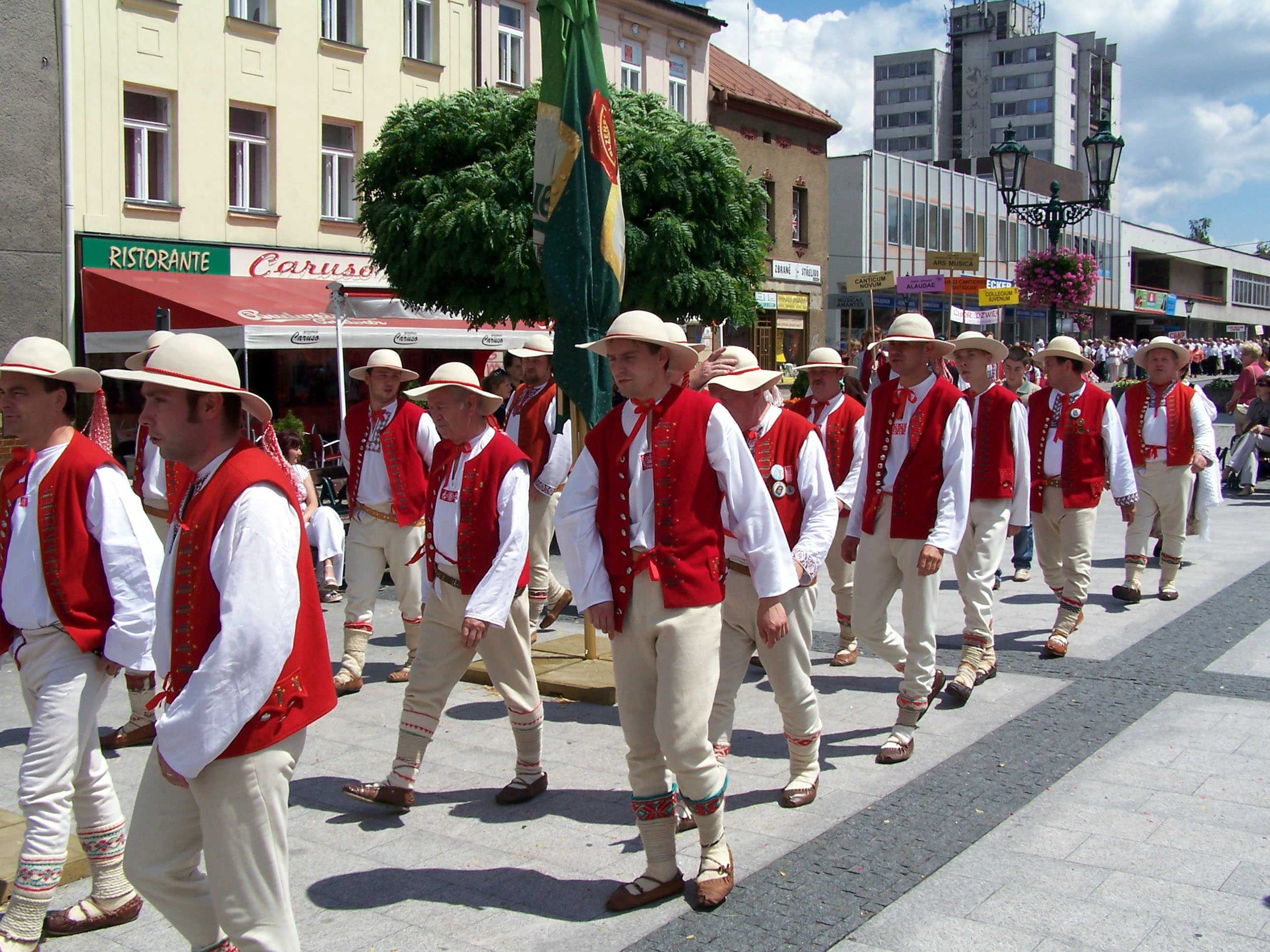
- Goral men's choir from Jablunkov during the parade of the Jubileuszowy Festiwal PZKO 2007 in Karviná

Total population
- 38,218 (2021 census) (Note: Including 11,416 people declaring the combination of Polish and other nationality. The real number can be higher as it was possible to leave the "nationality" field blank.)

Regions with significant populations
- Trans-Olza: 37,117 (2001 census)

Languages
- Polish, Czech, Cieszyn Silesian

Religion
- Roman Catholicism (57.02%), Lutheranism (15.84%) and Atheism (11.51%) (1991 census) (Note: Data are for the whole country.) (Note: Historical data: 1950 census – Roman Catholics (66.06%), Lutherans (29.97%), Atheists (0.94%). 1930 census – Roman Catholicism (60.87%), Lutheranism (32.53%), German Lutheran Church (3.25%), Atheism (0.89%).)

Related ethnic groups
- Other West Slavs, especially other Poles and Silesians

The Polish minority in the Czech Republic is a Polish national minority living mainly in the Trans-Olza region of western Cieszyn Silesia. The Polish community is the only national (or ethnic) minority in the Czech Republic that is linked to a specific geographical area. Trans-Olza is located in the north-eastern part of the country. It comprises Karviná District and the eastern part of Frýdek-Místek District. Many Poles living in other regions of the Czech Republic have roots in Trans-Olza as well.

Poles formed the largest ethnic group in Cieszyn Silesia in the 19th century, but at the beginning of the 20th century the Czech population grew. The Czechs and Poles collaborated on resisting Germanization movements, but this collaboration ceased after World War I. In 1920 the region of Trans-Olza was incorporated into Czechoslovakia after the Polish–Czechoslovak War. Since then the Polish population demographically decreased. In 1938 it was annexed by Poland in the context of the Munich Agreement and in 1939 by Nazi Germany. The region was then given back to Czechoslovakia after World War II. Polish organizations were re-created, but were banned by the Communist Party of Czechoslovakia. After the Velvet Revolution Polish organizations were re-created again and Trans-Olza adopted bilingual signs.

== History ==
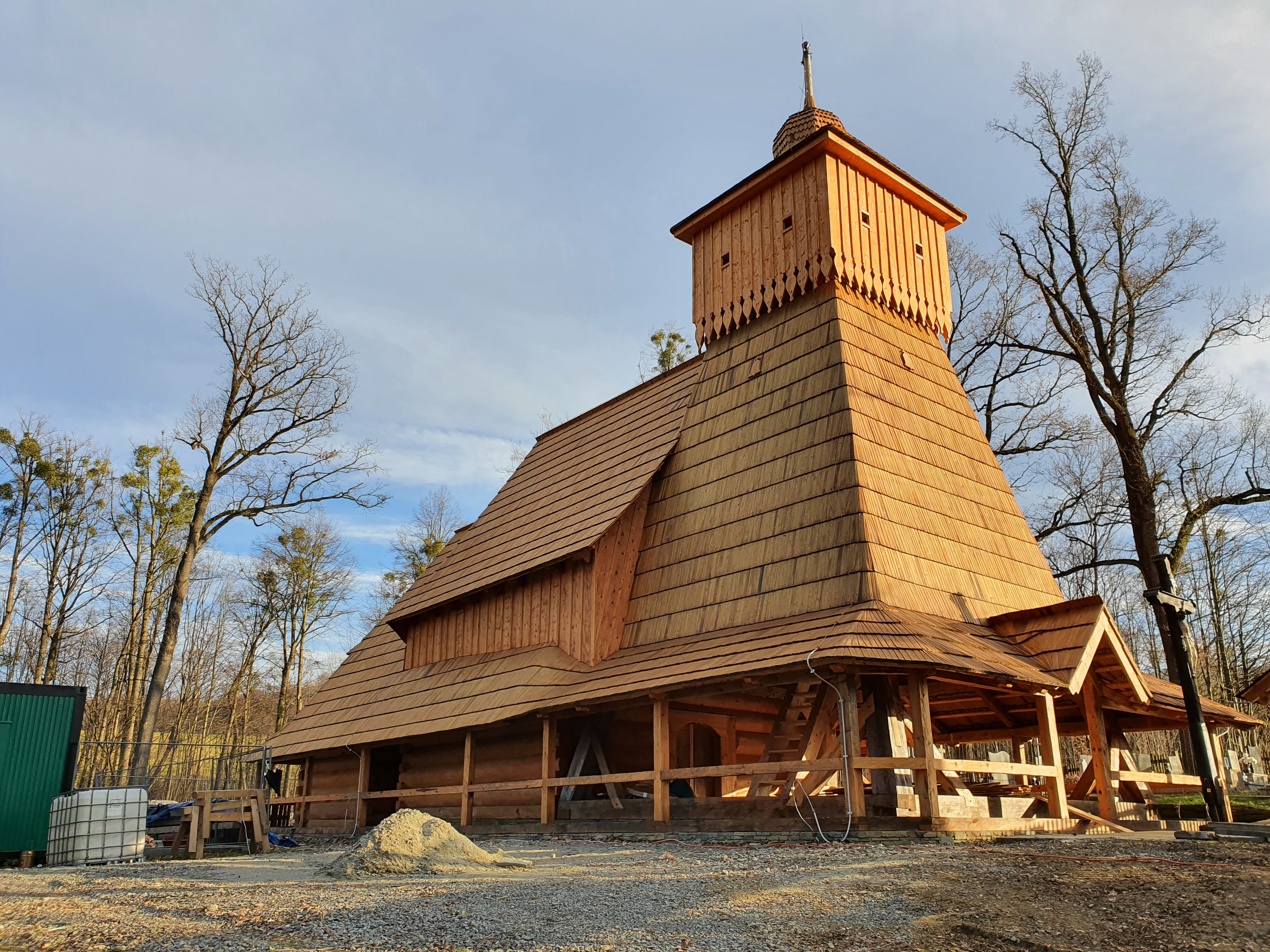
Replica of wooden church in Guty, originally built in 1563, one of the architectural symbols of the Trans-Olza region

Historically, the largest ethnic group inhabiting the Trans-Olza area was the Poles. During the 19th century the number of Germans grew. At the beginning of the 20th century and later from 1920 to 1938, the Czech population grew significantly (mainly as a result of immigration and the assimilation of locals) and the Poles became a minority, which they are to this day.

From 1848, the national consciousness of the local people grew and from 1848 to the end of the 19th century local Poles and Czechs co-operated, uniting against the Germanizing tendencies of the Austrian Empire, and later of Austria-Hungary. Various Polish clubs were founded. Most schools were Polish, followed by German and Czech. At the end of the century, ethnic tensions appeared as the area's economic significance grew. This growth caused a wave of immigration from Galicia, when about 60,000 people arrived and settled between 1880 and 1910. They settled mainly in the Ostrava region, but also in Trans-Olza. The new immigrants were Polish and poor, about half of them being illiterate, and worked mostly in coal mining and metallurgy. For these people, the most important factor was material well-being; they cared little about the homeland from which they had fled, more readily assimilating into the Czech population which was demographically dominant in the Ostrava region in the heart of Czech Silesia. The social structure of the territory was generally divided along ethnic lines. Germans were economically strongest, mostly owners, Czechs were mostly clerks and other officials, and Poles were mostly manual workers, miners, and metallurgists. This structure had changed over time but in 1921 it was still very similar, with 61.5% of Poles working as labourers.

=== Decision time (1918–1920) ===
There was a very tense climate in 1918–1920, a time of decision. It was decided that a plebiscite would be held in Cieszyn Silesia asking people which country the territory should join. Plebiscite commissioners arrived at the end of January 1920 and after analyzing the situation declared a state of emergency in the territory on 19 May 1920. The situation in the territory remained very tense. Mutual intimidation, acts of terror, beatings, and even killings affected the area. A plebiscite could not be held in this atmosphere. On 10 July both sides renounced the idea of a plebiscite and entrusted the Conference of Ambassadors with the decision. Eventually 58.1% of the area of Cieszyn Silesia and 67.9% of the population was incorporated into Czechoslovakia on 28 July 1920 by a decision of the Spa Conference. This division was in practice what gave birth to the concept of the Trans-Olza — in Polish Zaolzie, which literally means "the land beyond the Olza River" (looking from Poland).

=== In Czechoslovakia (1920–1938) ===
Local Czech militants forced about 5,000 local Poles, mostly from the northern part of the region, to flee to Poland already before July 1920. 4,000 of these expellees were located in a transitional camps in Oświęcim. About 12,000 Poles in total were forced to leave the region and flee to Poland in the aftermath of the division of Cieszyn Silesia. The local Polish population felt that Warsaw had betrayed them and they were not satisfied with the division. It is not quite clear how many Poles were in Trans-Olza in Czechoslovakia. Estimates range from 110,000 to 140,000 people in 1921. The 1921 and 1930 census numbers are not accurate since nationality depended on self-declaration and many Poles declared Czech nationality mainly as a result of fear of the new authorities and as compensation for some benefits. Czechoslovak law guaranteed rights for national minorities, but the reality in Trans-Olza was quite different. The local Czech authorities made it more difficult for local Poles to obtain citizenship, while the process was expedited when the applicant pledged to declare Czech nationality and send his children to a Czech school. Newly built Czech schools were often better supported and equipped, thus inducing some Poles to send their children there. This and other factors contributed to the assimilation of Poles and also to significant emigration to Poland. After a few years, the heightened nationalism typical of the period around 1920 receded and local Poles increasingly co-operated with the Czechs. Still, Czechization was supported by Prague, which did not abide by certain laws related to language, legislative, and organizational issues. Polish deputies in Czechoslovak National Assembly frequently tried to put that issues on agenda. One way or the other, increasingly local Poles thus assimilated into the Czech population.

=== In Poland (1938–1939) ===
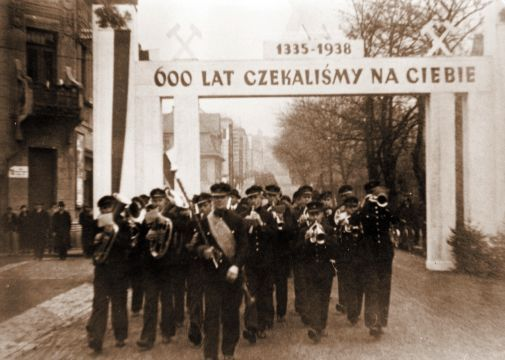
"For 600 years we have been waiting for you (1335–1938)." Ethnic Polish band welcoming the annexation of Trans-Olza by the Polish Republic in Karviná, October 1938

On 1 October 1938, Trans-Olza was annexed by Poland following the Munich Conference. The Polish Army, commanded by General Władysław Bortnowski, annexed an area of 801.5 km^{2} (309.5 mi^{2}) with a population of 227,399. The Polish side argued that Poles in Trans-Olza deserved the same rights as Germans in the Munich Agreement. The vast majority of the local Polish population enthusiastically welcomed the change, seeing it as a liberation and a form of historical justice. But they quickly changed their mood. The new Polish authorities appointed people from Poland to various positions from which Czechs had been dismissed. The Polish language became the sole official language.

Rapid Polonization followed. Czech organizations were dismantled and their activity was prohibited. Czech education ceased to exist. About 35,000 Czechs emigrated to Czechoslovakia by choice or forcibly. The behaviour of the new Polish authorities was different but similar in nature to that of the Czech authorities before 1938. Two political factions appeared: socialists (the opposition) and rightists (loyal to the new authorities). Leftist politicians and sympathizers were discriminated against and often dismissed from their jobs. The Polish political system was artificially implemented in Trans-Olza. Local Polish people continued to feel like second-class citizens and a majority of them were dissatisfied with the situation after October 1938. Trans-Olza remained a part of Poland for only eleven months.

=== World War II ===
During the war, strong Germanization was introduced by the Nazi authorities. The Jews were in the worst position, followed by the Poles. Poles received lower food rations, they were supposed to pay extra taxes, and were not allowed to enter theatres, cinemas, and other venues. Polish and Czech education ceased to exist, Polish organizations were dismantled and their activity was prohibited. The Nazis especially targeted the Polish intelligentsia and many functionaries died during the war. The German authorities introduced terror into Trans-Olza. Mass killings, executions, arrests, taking locals to forced labour, and deportations to concentration camps all happened on a daily basis. The most notorious war crime was a murder of 36 villagers in and around Żywocice on 6 August 1944. Most of the victims were Poles. This massacre is known as Tragedia Żywocicka (the Żywocice tragedy). The resistance movement, mostly of Poles, was fairly strong in Trans-Olza.

Soon, the Nazi Party introduced the Volksliste, a document which aimed to classify inhabitants of Nazi-occupied territories into categories of desirability. Refusal to sign this document could lead to deportation to a concentration camp. Local people who signed the lists were later on enrolled in the Wehrmacht. Many local people with no German ancestry were also forced to sign them.

The World War II death toll in Trans-Olza is estimated at 6,000 people: about 2,500 Jews, 2,000 other citizens (80% of them being Poles), and more than 1,000 locals who died in the Wehrmacht (those who signed the Volksliste). Serveral hundred Poles from Trans-Olza were among those murdered by the Soviets in the Katyń massacre. Percentage-wise, Trans-Olza suffered the worst human loss out of the whole of Czechoslovakia – about 2.6% of the total population.

=== Since 1945 and during the Communist era (1948–1989) ===
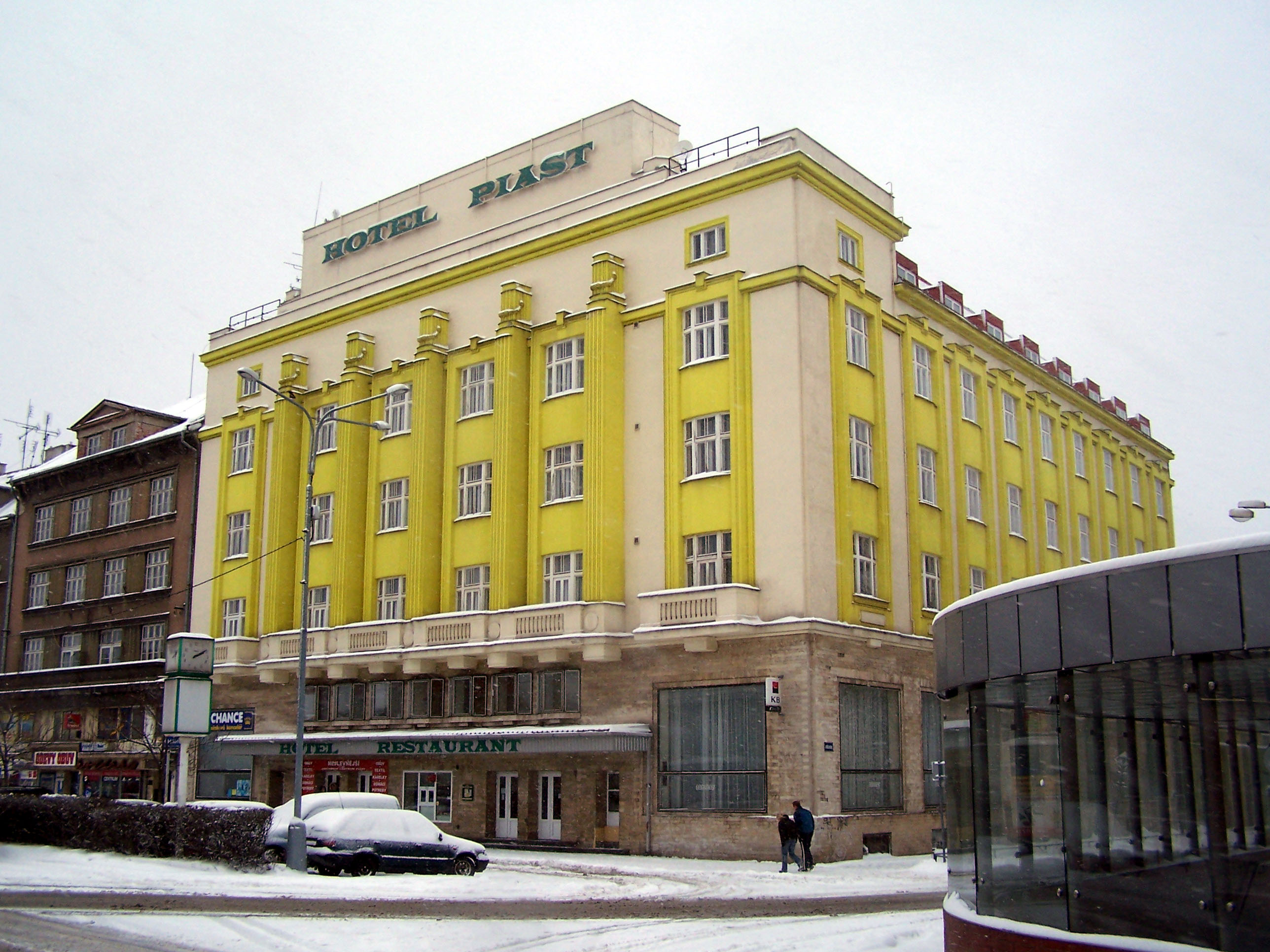
Hotel Piast in Český Těšín, one of the architectural symbols of the Polish minority

Immediately after World War II, Trans-Olza was returned to Czechoslovakia within its 1920 borders, although local Poles hoped it would again be given to Poland. The local Polish population again suffered discrimination, as many Czechs blamed them for the discrimination by the Polish authorities in 1938–1939. Polish organizations were banned, and the Czech authorities made many arrests and dismissed many from their jobs. Polish property stolen by the Germans during the war was never returned. The Communist Party of Czechoslovakia was the only political party defending the rights of the Polish minority. In the 1946 elections, the majority of Poles voted for the Communist Party. In Trans-Olza, 51% of elected communist officials were ethnic Poles. The situation of Poles improved somewhat when the Communist Party of Czechoslovakia seized power in February 1948. The Polish Cultural and Educational Union (PZKO) was created in 1947. The creation of other Polish organizations was prohibited. This was the only Polish organization representing the Polish minority in the Communist era, and was therefore under the strong influence of the Communist Party. It remains today the Polish organization with the largest membership.

During the communist era, rapid urbanization and growth of heavy industry occurred. Whole villages in the coal mining areas were destroyed by the mining activity. These conditions quickened the assimilation of the Poles. Another cause of assimilation was the high rate of intermarriage. Besides Poles belonging to the minority, many more commuted across the border from Polish People's Republic to work in Czechoslovakia or to take advantage of the relative abundance of consumer goods in Czechoslovakia.

During the 1960s, cultural life flourished. Polish books were published and Polish sections in Czech libraries were set up. For example, the state Czech Postal and Newspaper Service was delivering 72 magazines from Poland. During the Prague Spring, the more liberal atmosphere also contributed to the growth of cultural life. After 1968, purges were conducted throughout Czechoslovak society, including the Polish minority. Reformists were fired from their positions. The so-called "normalization" also affected the PZKO. From 1976 the law recommended the introduction of bilingual signs in some municipalities. Being only a recommended measure, it was not implemented. The Czechoslovak communist authorities tried to limit the influence of Poles, resident or not, considering the influence of Poles (given that Polish communist regime was considered more liberal) in the workplace a threat to the regime.

== Present times ==
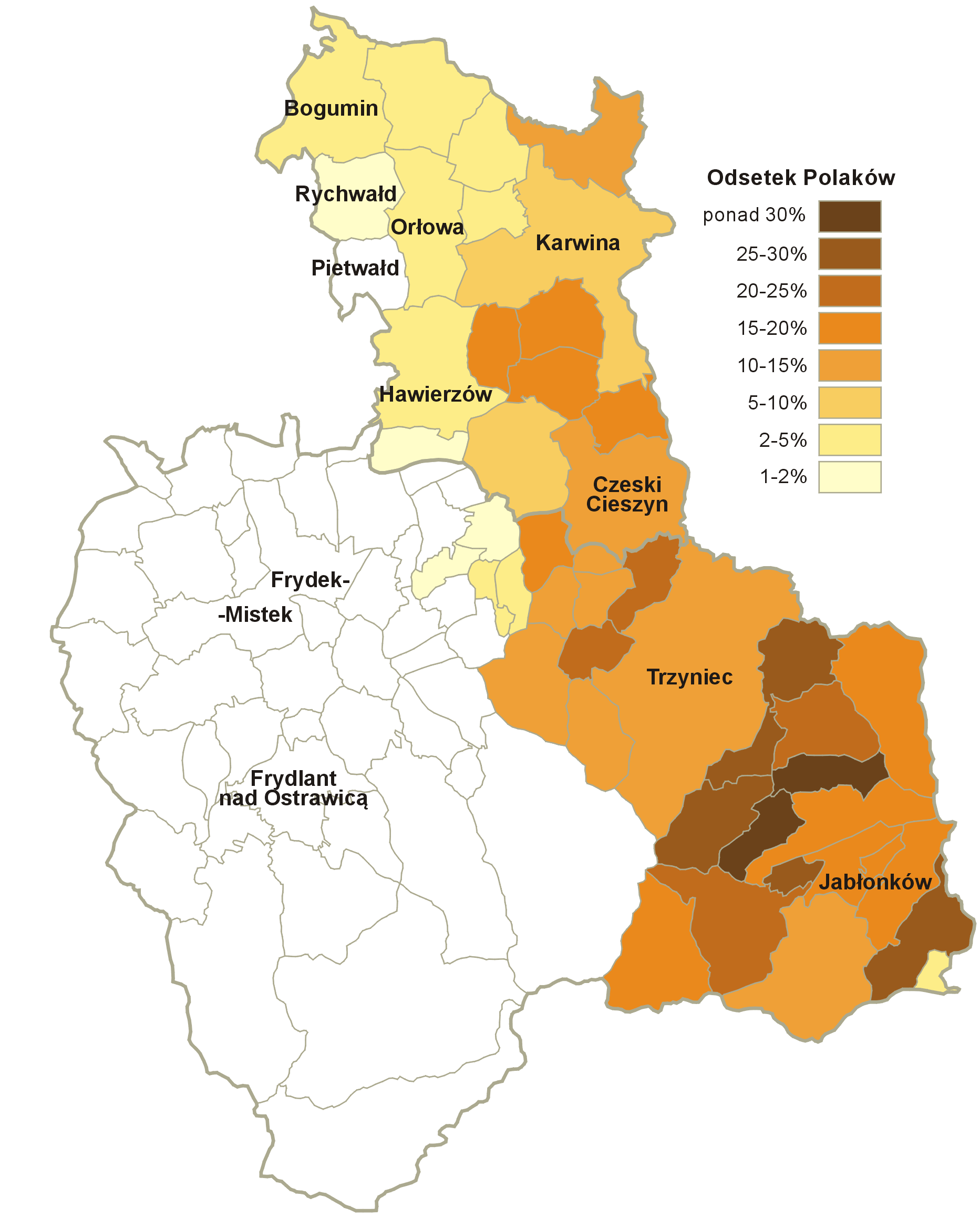
Polish minority in the Czech Republic according to the 2011 Population and Housing Census. Districts of Karviná and Frýdek-Místek are shown (with borders as on 2011).

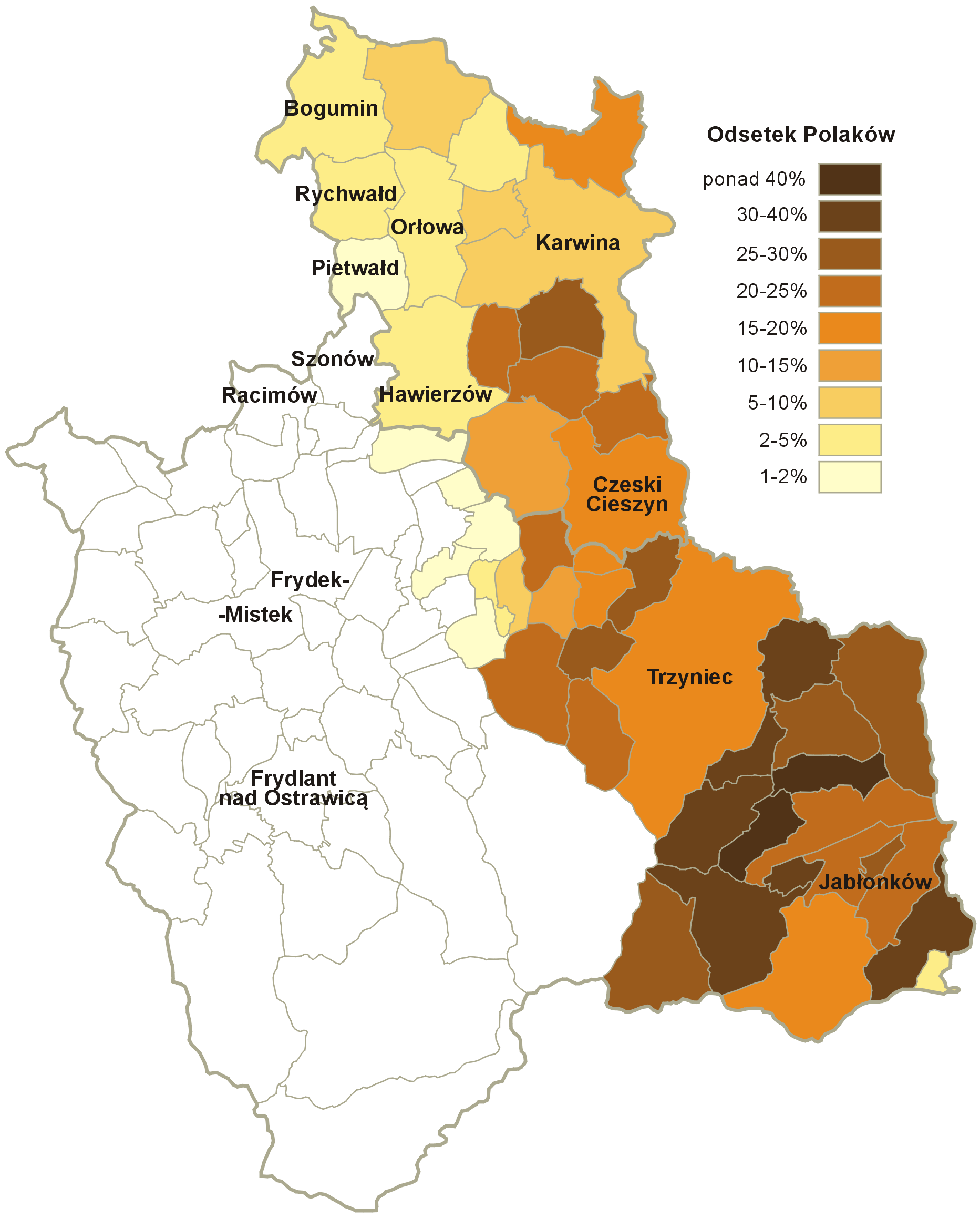
Polish minority in the Czech Republic according to the 2001 Population and Housing Census. Districts of Karviná and Frydek-Mistek are shown (with borders as on 2001).

After the Velvet Revolution of 1989, under democratic conditions, Polish organizations were quickly created. The Rada Polaków (Council of Poles) was created in 1990. The founders of the Council argued that the PZKO was not fulfilling its function of representing the Poles. The organization was renamed "Kongres Polaków" (Congress of Poles) in 1991. It is the main body representing the Polish minority in negotiations with the Czech government, etc. Local border crossings with Poland were opened in mid-1991, two years after the fall of Communism.

== Language and culture ==
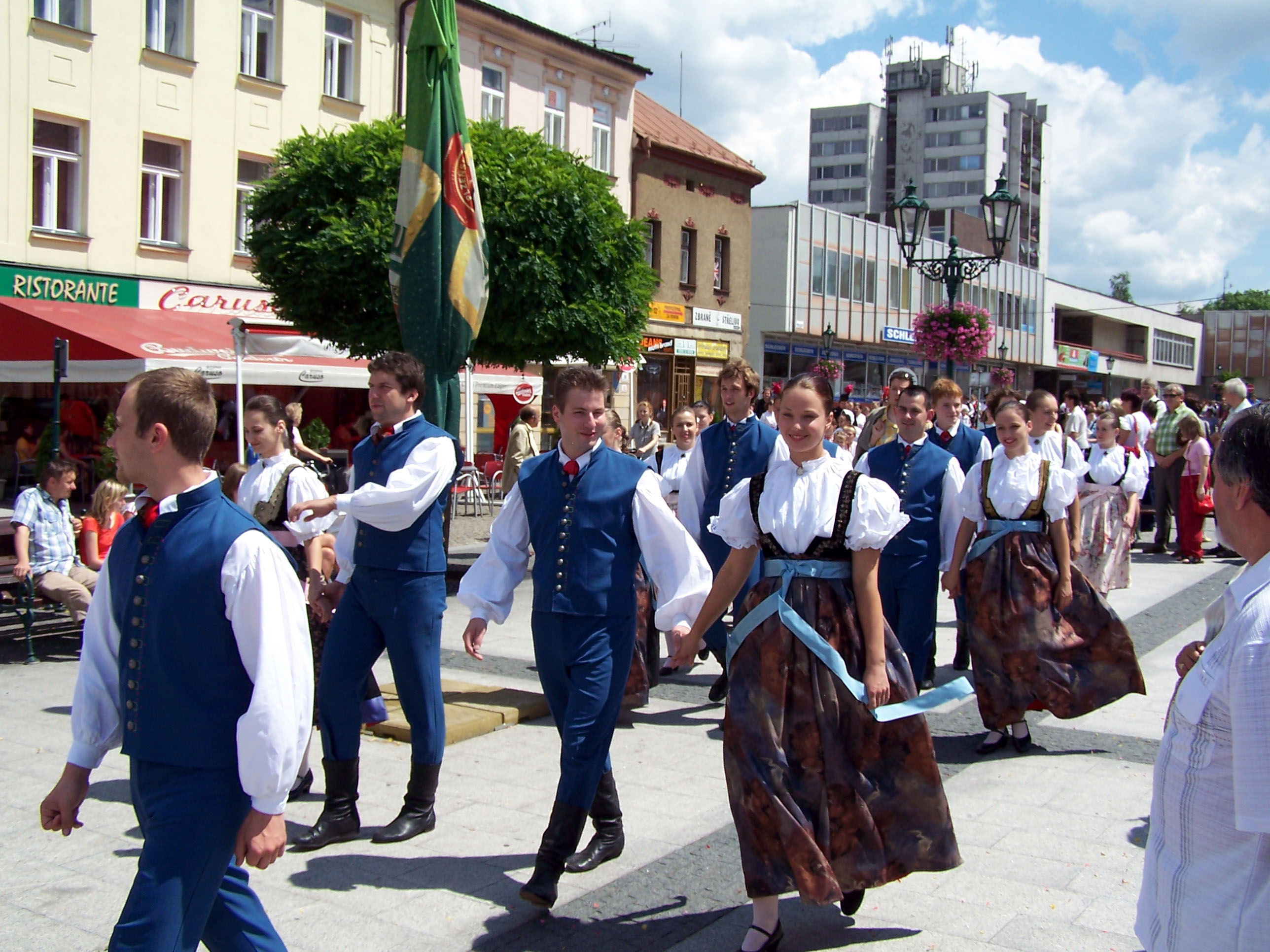
Olza group during the parade at the beginning of the Jubileuszowy Festiwal PZKO 2007 in Karviná

The primary language of the Polish population in Trans-Olza is the Cieszyn Silesian dialect, with the vast majority of Poles using it in everyday communication. The dialect is very prestigious and contributes to the pride of local people. It is also used by some local Czechs. Local Poles also feel a strong regional identity. In the Trans-Olza region, a few church services are conducted in Polish. 90% of worshippers among Polish secondary school students are reported to pray in Polish.

Concerning literature, there is a great variety of authors, genres, and editions produced in Polish. For traditional music, many groups are united in the association Ars Musica; this association also includes many choirs, such as Collegium Iuvenum, Collegium Canticorum, and Canticum Novum. Many other choirs and traditional folk vocal and dance groups exist, including Olza, Bystrzyca, Oldrzychowice, Suszanie, and Błędowianie, among others. Pop and rock bands include Glayzy, Glider, P-metoda, Apatheia, Poprostu and other groups. The Cieszyn Theatre in Český Těšín has a Polish Scene (ensemble). It is the only professional Polish theatre outside Poland.

Many cultural, folk, and music festivals are organized each year. The largest folklore festival of the Polish community and also the largest folklore festival in the Trans-Olza region is the annual Gorolski Święto (lit. "Goral's Festival") organized in Jablunkov. Dożynki (harvest festivals) are organized each year in several villages. Music festivals include Zlot in Bystřice, Zlot in Vendryně and Dni Kultury Studenckiej (Days of Student Culture) in Bystrzyca.

There is a 15-minute daily radio broadcast in Polish by Czech Radio Ostrava. Czech Television has been broadcasting in Polish for ten minutes a week since September 2003; television programmes from Poland can also be received. In 2003, Czech Television's studio in Ostrava launched a regular five-minute news and current affairs weekly in Polish. The broadcast was shortened to four minutes in 2007. The largest Polish newspaper in the country is Głos Ludu; the largest magazine is Zwrot.

== Education ==
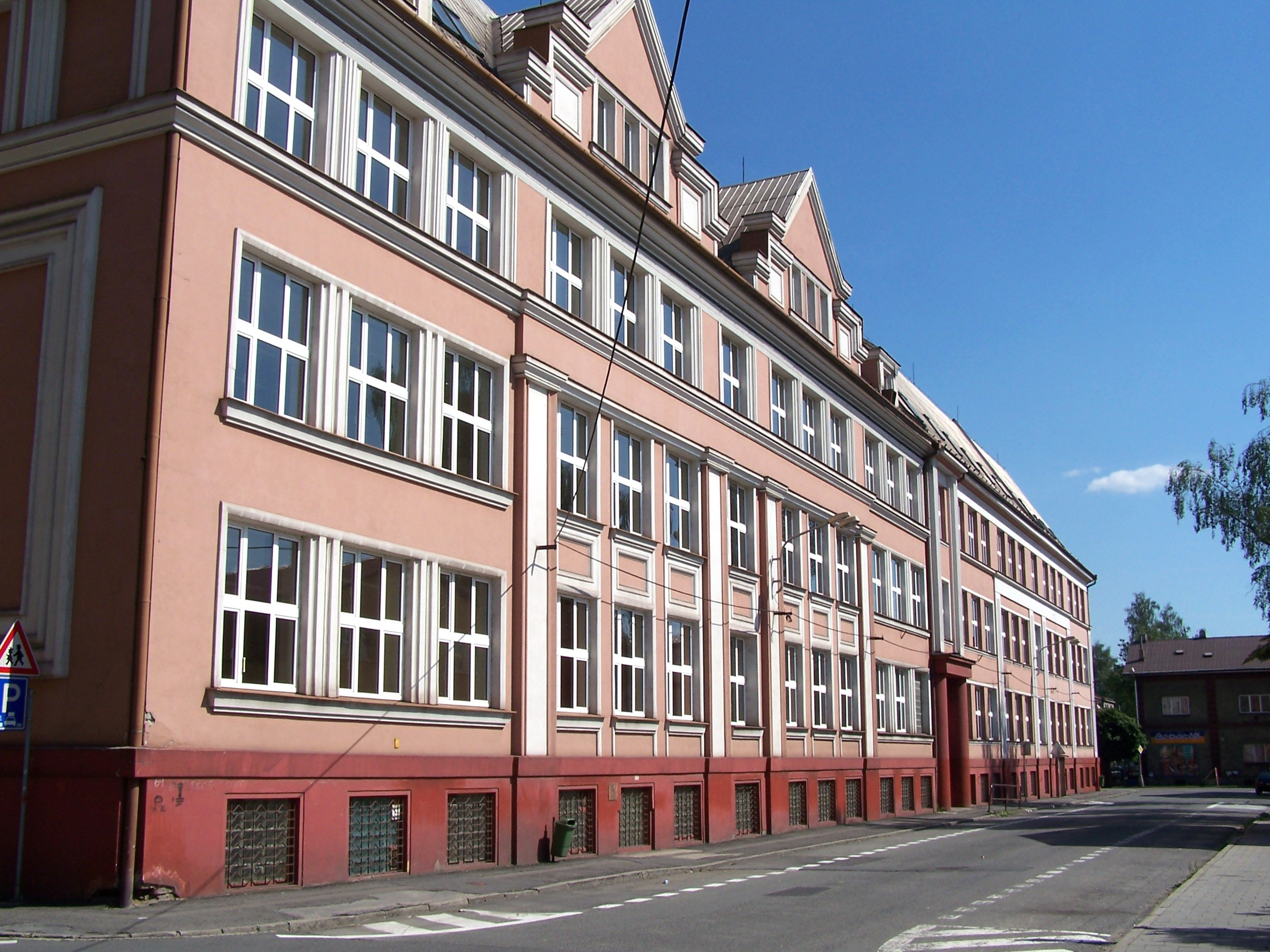
Polish primary school and gymnasium in Český Těšín

The Polish national minority has a complete education network with Polish teaching language. Polish education is the only ethnic minority education in the Czech Republic to cover the complete cycle from kindergarten through high school. In 2020/21, there were 19 kindergartens, 21 primary schools and one high school with Polish teaching language, in total with 3,134 pupils, and 5 kindergarten with both Polish and Czech language.

Polish primary schools function in the following municipalities: Albrechtice (Olbrachcice), Bukovec (Bukowiec), Bystřice (Bystrzyca), Český Těšín (Czeski Cieszyn), Dolní Lutyně (Lutynia Dolna), Havířov (Hawierzów), Hnojník (Gnojnik), Horní Suchá (Sucha Górna), Hrádek (Gródek), Jablunkov (Jabłonków), Karviná (Karwina), Košařiska (Koszarzyska), Milíkov (Milików), Mosty u Jablunkova (Mosty koło Jabłonkowa), Návsí (Nawsie), Orlová (Orłowa), Ropice (Ropica), Stonava (Stonawa), Těrlicko (Cierlicko), Třinec (Trzyniec), and Vendryně (Wędrynia).

The only Polish high school is the Juliusz Słowacki Polish Gymnasium in Český Těšín. Polish classes are open in the Technical School in Karviná, the Economic School in Český Těšín, and the Medical School in Karviná. In the past there were more Polish schools in the area, but the number is historically declining along with the demographic decline in the Polish population as a whole.

== Sport ==
First Polish sport organizations have been founded in the 1890s. In the interwar period there was a plethora of organizations of all types in all Central European countries, the Trans-Olza region wasn't exception. Sport clubs there were often multi-sport, associating several sport branches, mostly football, athletics, volleyball, table tennis etc.

The Sokół movement was active in Cieszyn Silesia even before World War I. After 1920 division of the region, Sokół became active in Czechoslovakia. At the beginning of the 1930s it associated 11 local branches and about 1,500 members. After World War II, it hasn't renewed its activity.

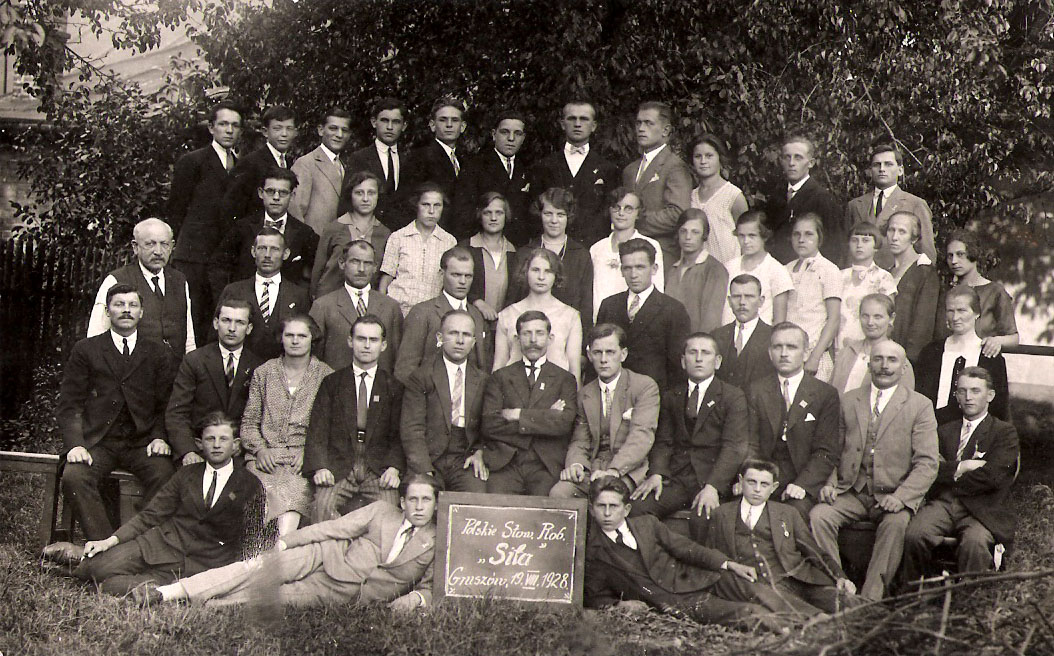
Polskie Stowarzyszenie Robotnicze "Siła" Hrušov, August 1928 (Note: Hrušov (Gruszów) doesn't lie in Trans-Olza. It is currently a part of the city of Ostrava.)

Another large sport organization was Siła (i.e. "power"). It was created in 1908 but established again in 1921 as Polskie Stowarzyszenie Robotnicze Siła (Polish Workers' Association 'Power'). The organization was of socialist and workers' character and in 1937 associated 25 local branches. After World War II Siłan operated half-legally in 17 local branches, and after the communist takeover of power in 1948 was liquidated by Czechoslovak communist authorities.

Another large organization was Polskie Towarzystwo Turystyczne 'Beskid Śląski' (Polish Tourist Association 'Silesian Beskids') established in 1910. Initially it focused on organizing the Polish tourist movement and building mountain huts in the Beskids but later widened its activities to skiing, football, athletics and volleyball. In the 1930s it associated 27 local branches. After World War II it operated half-legally and as Siła, was liquidated by Czechoslovak communist authorities after the Victorious February 1948. It resumed its activity again in 1991, after the fall of communism.

The last notable multi-sport club was Proletariacka Kultura Fizyczna (PFK, Proletarian Physical Culture). It was created in the mid-1920s and was of communist character. In the 1930s it associated about 40 active local branches. After the Trans-Olza region was annexed in 1938 by Poland it was banned together with the communist party.

The most popular sport was football. Volleyball, athletics, table tennis and other sports were also popular. The club with most members was PKS Polonia Karwina, associating some 1,000 members. Its football branch was the best Polish football club of Trans-Olza.

After World War II many Polish sport clubs resumed slowly their activity. After the communist takeover of power in Czechoslovakia in February 1948 communists began to curb number of organizations in the country and tried to achieve the state of only several active nationwide organizations. Therefore, many Polish clubs after 1948 stopped their activity. The ones who still operated were subjected to rising pressure since 1951. Last independent Polish organizations were dissolved in 1952.

After 1952 the Polish sport life was organized through the Polish Cultural and Educational Union. Through the communist era Polish minority declined demographically and this process continue to date, hence after the fall of communism in 1989 only a few sport organizations resumed their activity. Beskid Śląski, the only notable one, focuses on tourism. No exclusively Polish sport club exists today in Trans-Olza.

== Legal issues ==
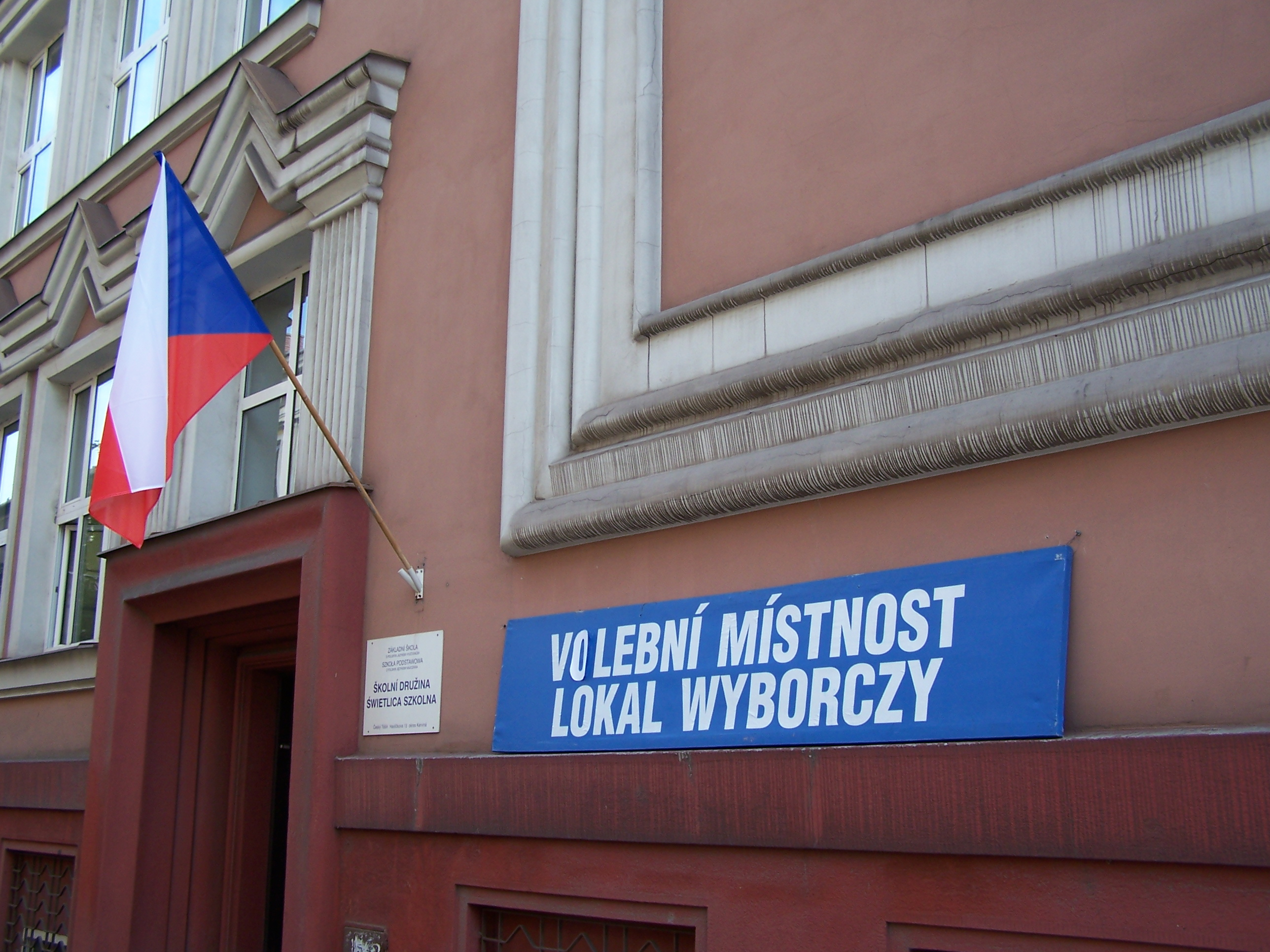
Czech and Polish bilingual signs during the 2006 municipal elections in Český Těšín

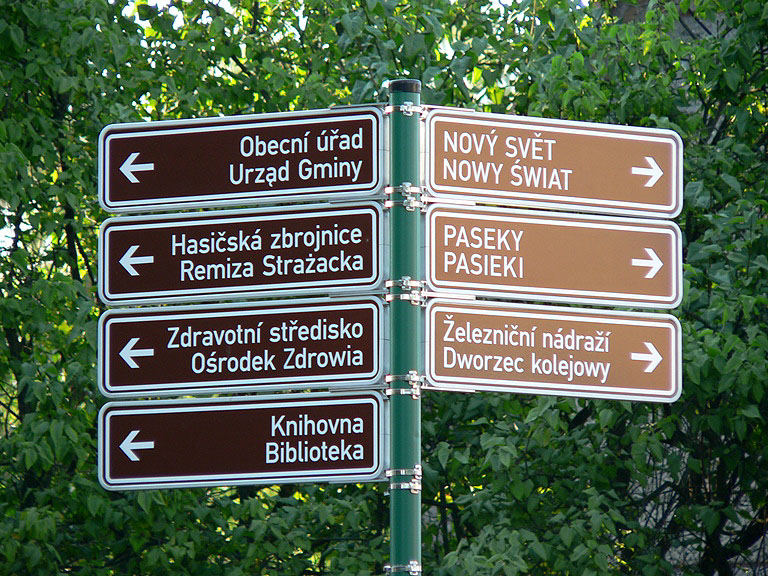
Bilingual signs in Albrechtice

The erection of bilingual signs has technically been permitted since 2001, if a minority constitutes 10% of the population of a municipality. The requirement for a petition by the members of a minority has been abolished, thus simplifying the whole process. However, only a couple of villages with large Polish minorities have bilingual signs yet (Vendryně for instance). For a list of all municipalities with a Polish population of at least 10%, see Polish municipalities in the Czech Republic.

== Demography ==
The Polish population is historically declining. This is primarily caused by low natural birth rate, assimilation, high intermarriage rate (the majority of Poles live in mixed relationships), and migration to other parts of the country as a result of job seeking.

Polish population according to censuses

Year	Pop.	±%
1921	103,521	—
1930	92,689	−10.5%
1950	70,816	−23.6%
1961	66,540	−6.0%

Year	Pop.	±%
1970	64,074	−3.7%
1980	66,123	+3.2%
1991	59,383	−10.2%
2001	51,968	−12.5%

Year	Pop.	±%
2011	39,096	−24.8%
2021	38,218	−2.2%

== Notable people ==
=== Politicians ===
- Jan Buzek, interwar MP
- Jerzy Buzek, President of European Parliament, Former Prime Minister of Poland
- Emanuel Chobot, interwar MP
- Karol Junga, interwar MP
- Joseph Kubisz, Austro-Hungarian diplomat, Polish consul in New York City, Pittsburgh and Chicago
- Tadeusz Michejda, Minister of Health of Poland
- Karol Śliwka, interwar communist politician, MP
- Leon Wolf, interwar Czechoslovak MP and later senator in Polish Senate
- Josef Zieleniec, former Foreign Minister of the Czech Republic

=== Writers ===
- Henryk Jasiczek, poet
- Jan Kubisz, poet, author of Płyniesz Olzo po dolinie, unofficial anthem of Poles of Trans-Olza
- Paweł Kubisz, poet
- Gustaw Morcinek, one of the most important Polish writers from Silesia
- Józef Ondrusz
- Karol Piegza
- Adam Wawrosz

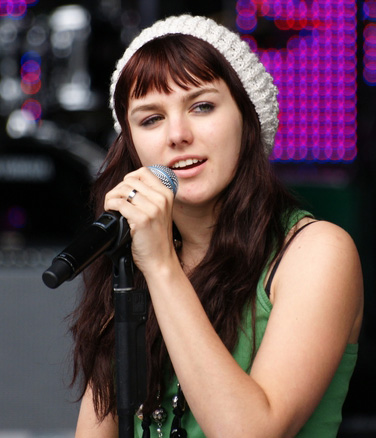
Polish-Czech singer Ewa Farna

=== Other ===
- Przemysław Branny, actor and singer
- Józef Buzek, economist
- Albert Černý, pop singer
- Ewa Farna, pop singer
- Tadeusz Kraus, footballer
- Adam Makowicz, jazz musician
- Halina Mlynkova, pop singer
- Bronislav Poloczek, theatre and television actor
- Krystyna Pyszková, model and Miss World 2023

== See also ==
- Czechs in Poland
- Demographics of the Czech Republic, for other ethnic minorities in the country
- Polish People's Party, Polish party in interwar Czechoslovakia
- Polish Socialist Workers Party, Polish party in interwar Czechoslovakia
- Polish diaspora, for other Polish communities outside Poland
- Czech Republic–Poland relations
