= Těšín Theatre =

Theatre in Český Těšín, Czech Republic

- Těšínské divadlo
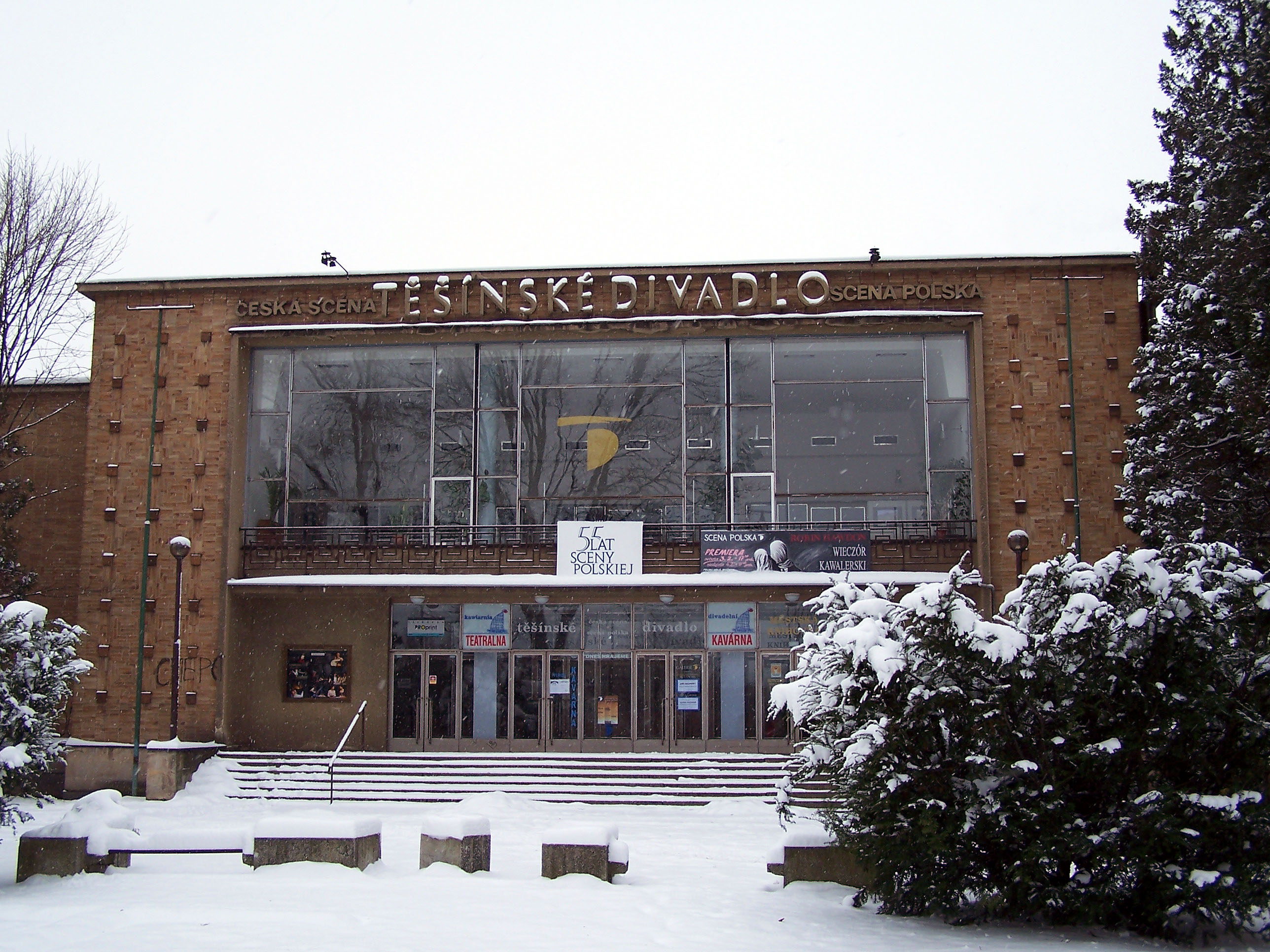
- Těšín Theatre building
- Interactive map of Těšín Theatre
- Address: Ostravská 67; Český Těšín; Czech Republic
- Coordinates: 49°44′45.3″N 18°36′46.8″E

Construction
- Opened: 1945

Website
- Official website

Těšín Theatre (Czech: Těšínské divadlo, Polish: Teatr Cieszyński) is a theatre in the town of Český Těšín, Czech Republic.

The theatre is unique because it comprises two ensembles, Czech and Polish; plays are presented in both the Czech and Polish languages. The Polish ensemble serves the Polish minority in the Czech Republic. Together with ensembles in Vilnius and Lviv it is one of the few theatres outside Poland which has a professional Polish ensemble.

== History ==
The theatre was founded in August 1945. It changed its name several times. The current one is from 1991. Until 1961 it operated in several places in the town. In 1961 the new building was built and the theatre was relocated there.

== Directors ==
- Antonín Kryška (1945–1946)
- Jan Macháček (April 1946 – May 1946)
- Antonín Brož (June 1946 – December 1946)
- Jan Macháček (1946–1949)
- Josef Zajíc (1949–1960)
- František Kordula (1960–1972)
- Libuše Kišová (deputy) (1972–1973)
- Ladislav Slíva (deputy) (1973–1974)
- Josef Srovnal (1974–1976)
- Józef Wierzgoń (1976–1990)
- Ladislav Slíva (1990–1996)
- Roman Rozbrój (1996–2000)
- Karol Suszka (2000–2018)
- Petr Kracik (2018–)
