= Polish Cultural and Educational Union =

Polish organization in the Czech Republic

Polski Związek Kulturalno-Oświatowy
- Emblem of PZKO

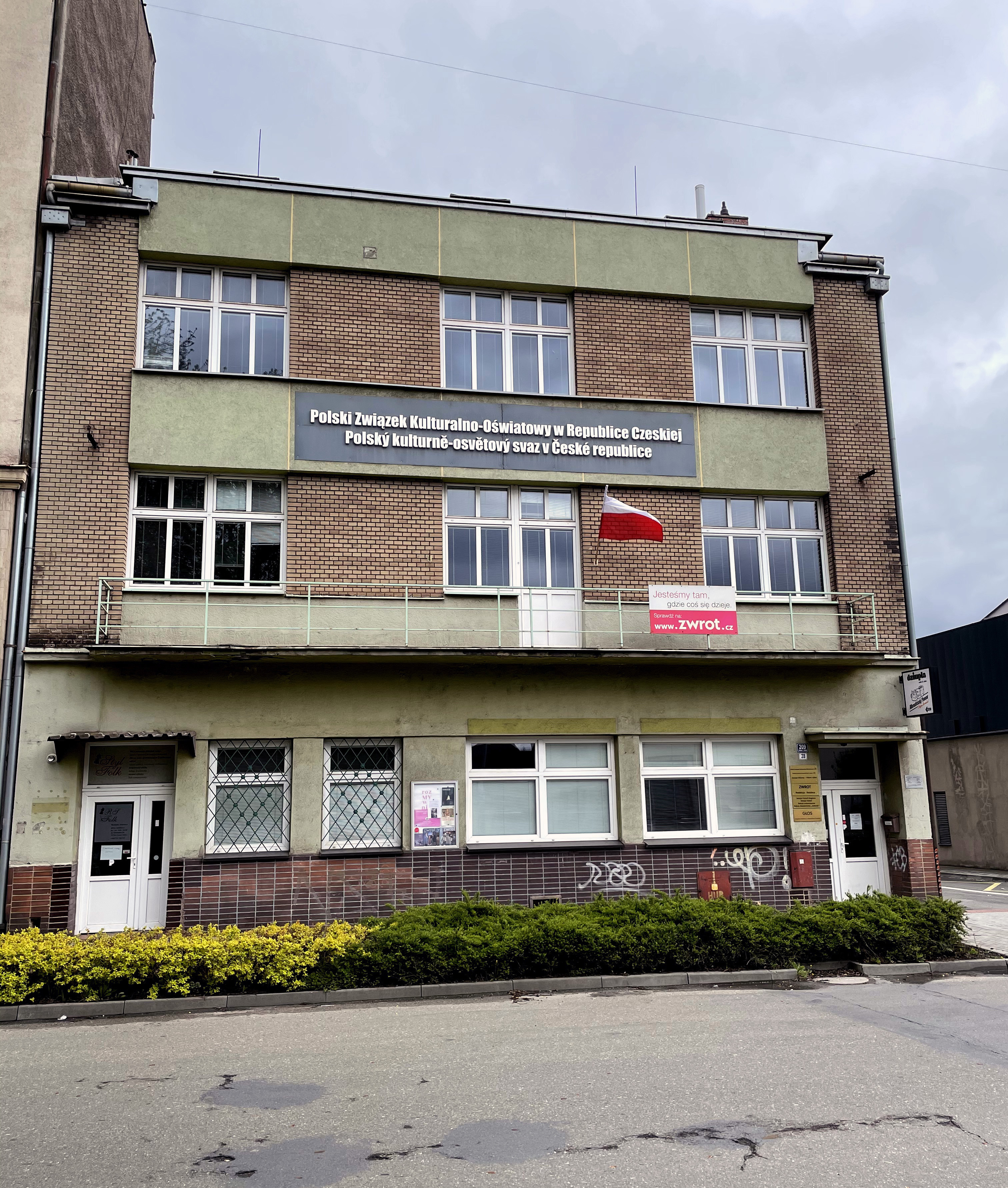
- Headquarters of PZKO in Český Těšín
- Formation: 1947; 79 years ago
- Type: Cultural and educational organization
- Headquarters: Český Těšín
- Location: Trans-Olza, Czech Republic
- Region served: Trans-Olza
- Members: 12,000
- Official language: Polish
- Chairman: Helena Legowicz
- Website: https://www.pzko.cz

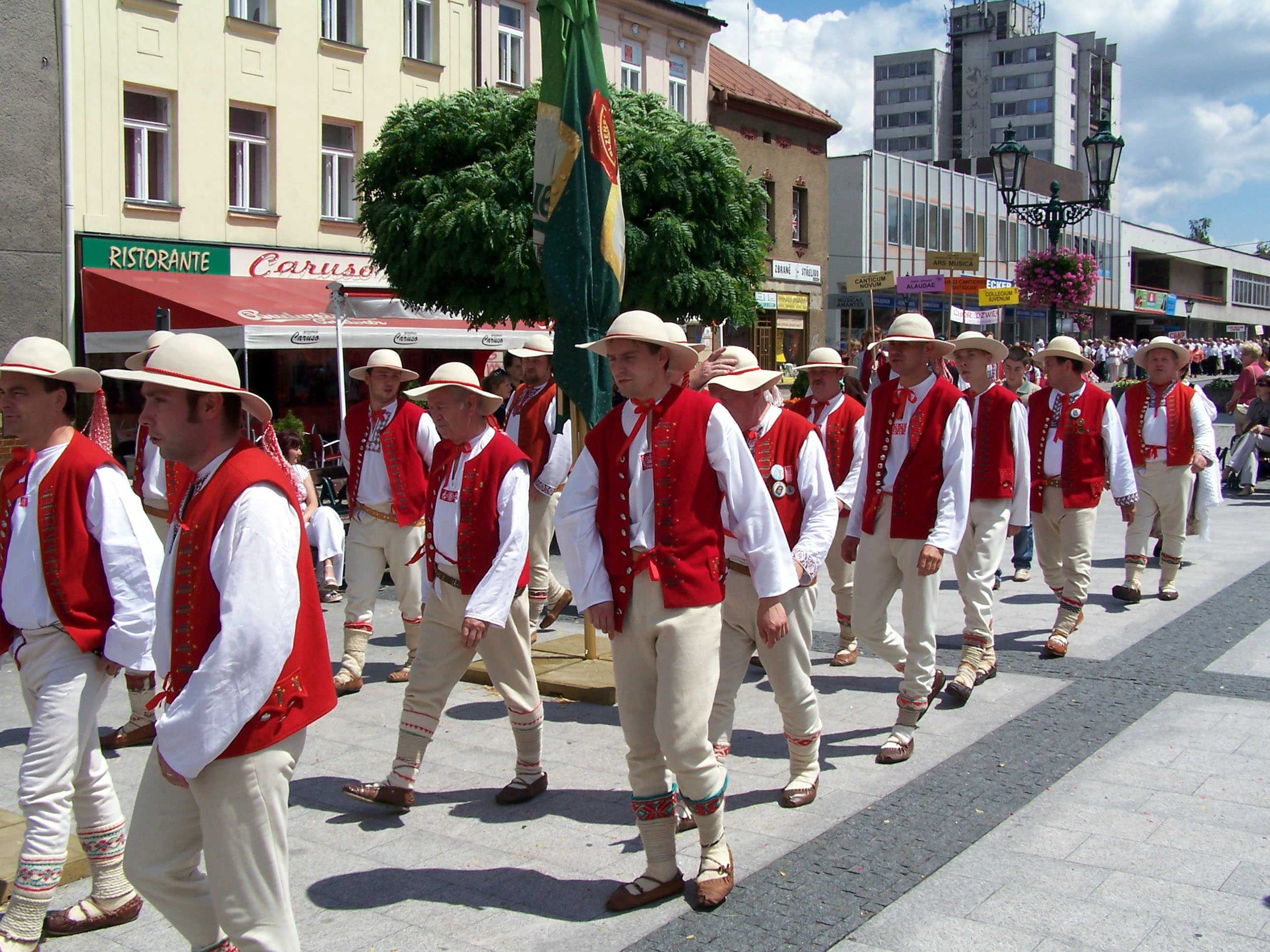
Gorol men's choir from Jabłonków during the parade at the beginning of the Jubileuszowy Festiwal PZKO 2007 in Karviná.

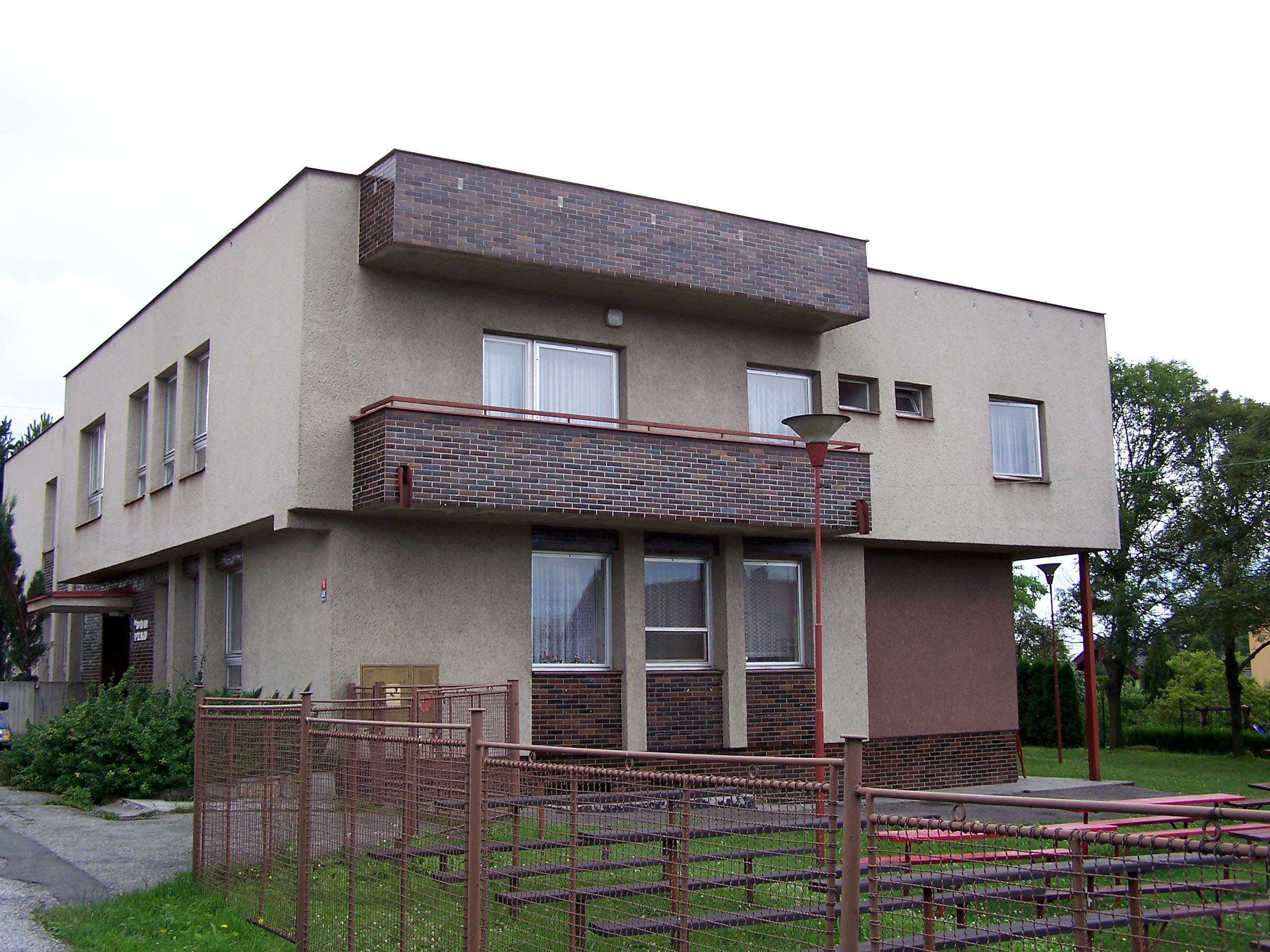
PZKO House in Błędowice Dolne (Dolní Bludovice)

Polski Związek Kulturalno-Oświatowy (commonly known as PZKO; Czech: Polský kulturně-osvětový svaz, meaning "Polish Cultural and Educational Union") is a Polish organization in the Czech Republic. It represents the Polish minority in the Czech Republic together with the Congress of Poles. PZKO is the largest Polish organization with largest membership in the Czech Republic, although the number of members is decreasing as a result of demographic decline of the Polish community.

== History ==
Before World War II there was a myriad of various Polish organizations. When PZKO organization was founded, in 1947, creating of other Polish organizations was prohibited. It was the only organization representing the Polish minority in the communist era, therefore it was under strong influence of the Communist Party. PZKO gained monopolist position, and was responsible for all activities related to the Poles, as other Polish organizations have been banned. Eventually, PZKO became more under influence of the Communist Party, being incorporated by authorities into the communist National Front in the 1950s. During the 1960s, reformists began to have stronger voice, but after the Prague Spring of 1968, purges were conducted, and reformists were fired from their positions. Ernest Sembol, chairman of the General Committee of PZKO was also fired. The so-called Normalization Era had begun, and PZKO was under even stronger influence of the Communist authorities. After the Velvet Revolution, in 1990, PZKO exonerated people discriminated after 1968, including most noted personalities: Jan Rusnok, Henryk Jasiczek, Wiesław Adam Berger, Tadeusz Siwek and Ernest Sembol.

== Activities ==
The goals of PZKO are to promote and shield various cultural and educational activities of the Polish minority. PZKO organizes and supports many activities, including clubs (women's, senior's, youth's), lectures, concerts, excursions, dance, music and folklore groups, choirs, art groups, exhibitions, various sport and social activities etc. The largest and most famous event shielded by the organization, is the annual Gorolski Święto, in Jablunkov, another large event organized by PZKO is Festiwal PZKO. PZKO also closely cooperates with Polish schools in Trans-Olza, and with the Polish Scene (ensemble) of Cieszyn Theatre, in Český Těšín.

For its activities PZKO was awarded several awards, including the Wojciech Korfanty Award in 2001 for achievements and merits in preserving the Polishness of Silesia.

PZKO comprises local branches, called MKs (Miejscowe Koła) which exist in almost all municipalities in Trans-Olza. Most of these local branches have their own buildings, known as Domy PZKO (PZKO Houses), which serve as a place of various cultural and other events.

General Committee (Zarząd Główny) is housed in Český Těšín. Its current chairman is Helena Legowicz.

== Statistics ==
| Year | Local branches | Members |
|---|---|---|
| 1947 | 79 | 7,296 |
| 1949 | 79 | 11,214 |
| 1952 | 80 | 13,046 |
| 1955 | - | 16,170 |
| 1960 | 92 | 17,780 |
| 1965 | 92 | 19,994 |
| 1967 | 92 | 20,656 |
| 1970 | 92 | 20,858 |
| 1975 | 94 | 23,449 |
| 1980 | 94 | 24,237 |
| 1985 | 95 | 23,701 |
| 1988 | 95 | 23,171 |
| 1990 | 95 | 23,070 |
| 1993 | 93 | 20,825 |
| 1995 | 92 | 20,200 |
| 1996 | 91 | 19,573 |
| 2007 | 84 | 12,300 |
| 2021 | 81 | 12,000 |

== Chairmen of the ZG (General Committee) ==
- Jan Pribula (1950–1951)
- Józef Kula (1951–1953)
- Karol Mrózek (1953–1955)
- Józef Mrózek (1955–1957)
- Adolf Kubeczka (1957–1959)
- Bogumił Goj (1959–1962)
- Eugeniusz Suchanek (1962–1968)
- Ernest Sembol (1968–1970)
- Jan Pribula (1970–1971)
- Eugeniusz Suchanek (1971–1975)
- Stanisław Kondziołka (1975–1987)
- Roman Suchanek (1987–1990)
- Władysław Młynek (1990–1993)
- Jerzy Czap (1993–1999)
- Zygmunt Stopa (1999–2009)
- Jan Ryłko (2009–2017)
- Helena Legowicz (2017–)

== See also ==
- CSEMADOK – similar organization of Hungarians in Czechoslovakia
