= Congress of Poles in the Czech Republic =

Polish organization in the Czech Republic

Logo of the organization

Kongres Polaków w Republice Czeskiej (Czech: Kongres Poláků v České republice) (meaning "The Congress of Poles in the Czech Republic") is a Polish organization in the Czech Republic. It fulfills two main tasks. It coordinates activities of other Polish organizations in the country, and represents Polish minority in negotiations with the Czech government. Current chairman is Mariusz Wałach.

It was created on 3 February 1990, in Český Těšín, as Rada Polaków (The Council of Poles), and was renamed to the current name in 1991. Founders of the Council argued that the Polish Cultural and Educational Union, the only Polish organization in communist Czechoslovakia, did not fulfill its function to represent the Poles, and therefore new organization is needed. The organization is a member of the Federal Union of European Nationalities.
