= Hvat =

Length unit

Hvat (Serbian: хват) is a historical unit of length that was common in Croatia and Serbia analogous to fathom. The measurement system based on the hvat is called hvatski sistem (literally "hvat system").

1 hvat equals:

- 6 × stopa (stopa is analogous to Austrian "Vienna foot" = 0.316080640 metres.);
- 72 × palac (1 stopa = 12 × palac; palac is analogous to Austrian "Vienna inch" = 2.6340053 cm);
- 1.89648384 metres.

1 metre equals 0.527292 hvats.

== Surface ==
The hvat measurement system had been developed from Austrian units of measurement, used in Croatia and Vojvodina (northern part of Serbia) while they were parts of Austro-Hungarian Empire (Austria-Hungary). Hvat is equal to Austrian measure Viennese klafters. In the hvat system, hvat is used as a basis for the unit of area, called "kvadratni hvat" (Serbian) or "četvorni hvat" (both Serbian and Croatian). This could be translated as "square hvat" and is analogous to square fathom. The square hvat and other derived units in the hvat system are still sometimes encountered in measuring land.

1 square hvat equals 3.596652 square meters; 1 square meter equals 0.278036431 square hvats.

=== Derived units ===
Square hvat is used as the basis for other units of surface in the hvat system.

- motika; one motika = 200 square hvats = 719.3304 square meters.
- jutro ("morning", compare the unit Morgen) or Joch in Austria; one jutro = 8 motika = 1,600 square hvats = 5,754.6432 square meters.
- lanac; one lanac = 10 motika = 2,000 square hvats = 7,193.304 square meters.

When used today, the units are often rounded to the nearest square meter. Thus, jutro is rounded to 5,755 square meters and lanac is rounded to 7,192 square meters. When more precision is needed, katastarsko jutro (meaning cadastral jutro) is used, that equals exactly 0.5754642 hectares (5,754.642 square meters).

Other historical units that are sometimes used to measure surface together with the square hvat are:

- dulum; one dulum equals 1,000 square meters.
- šinik; one šinik equals 1,000 square meters.

=== Map scales ===
Maps depicting land measured in hvat system are drawn in following scales:

- 1:720 (1 palac = 10 hvats);
- 1:1440 (1 palac = 20 hvats);
- 1:2880 (1 palac = 40 hvats).

== Volume ==
Hvat is also used as a basis for the unit of volume, called "kubni hvat", often colloquially abbreviated to "kubik" in both languages (though note that the same abbreviation is used for cubic meter). This could be translated as "cubic hvat" (analogous to cubic fathom).

If calculated from hvat, one cubic hvat would equal 6.820992 cubic meters. General Encyclopedia of the Yugoslav Lexicographical Institute, however, lists "metrički hvat", most commonly used to measure firewood, equal to 4 cubic meters.

== See also ==
- Fathom
- palac
