= Milíkov (Frýdek-Místek District) =

Milíkov Milików
- Municipality
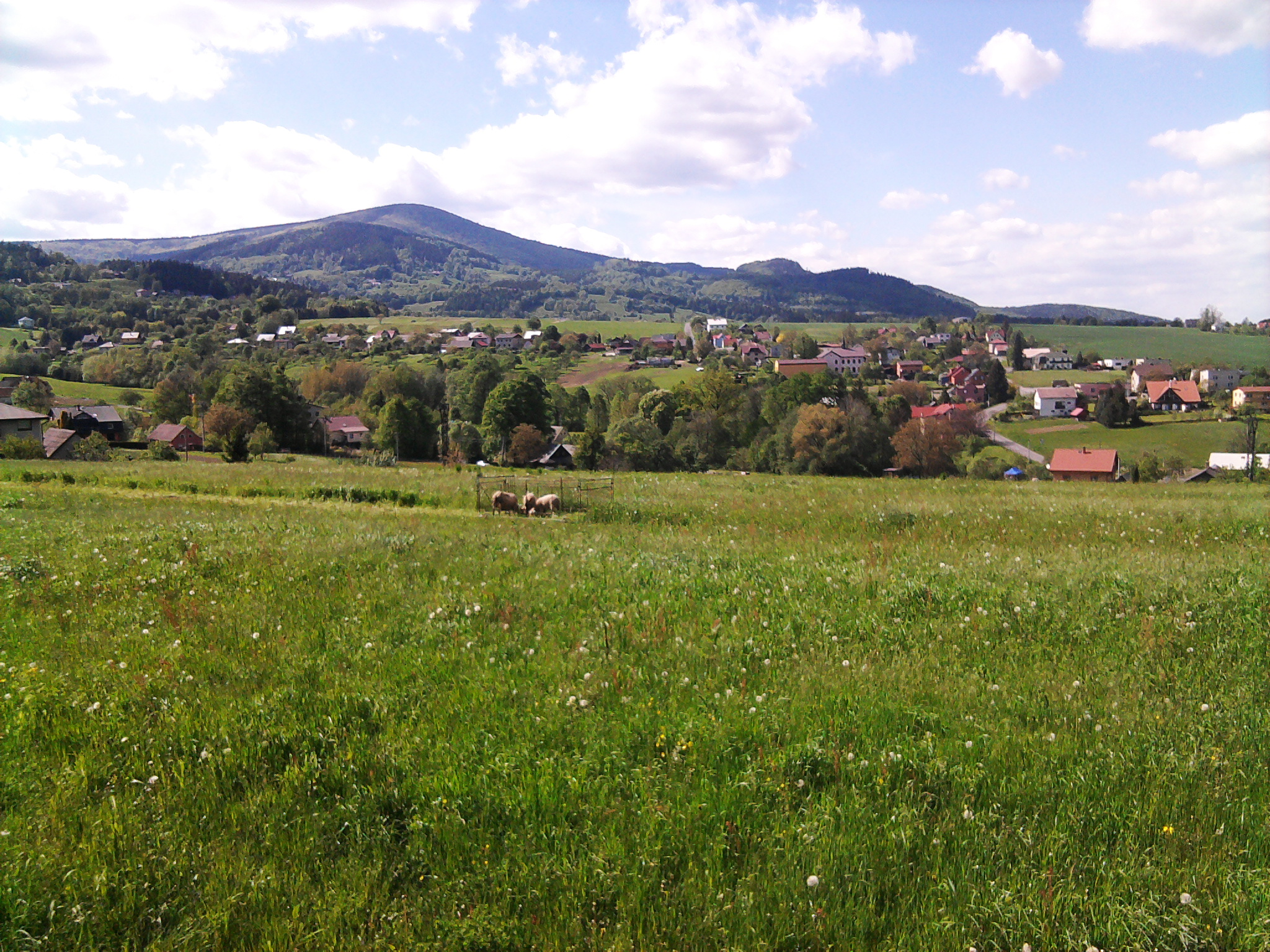
- General view

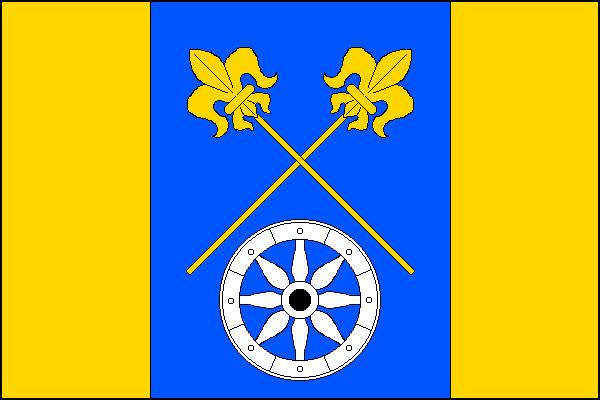
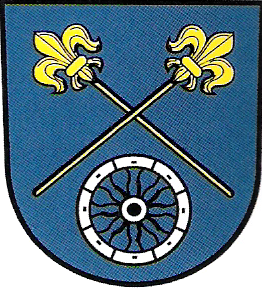
- Flag Coat of arms

- Location in the Czech Republic
- Coordinates: 49°35′8″N 18°43′10″E
- Country: Czech Republic
- Region: Moravian-Silesian
- District: Frýdek-Místek
- First mentioned: 1577

Area
  - Total: 9.16 km^{2} (3.54 sq mi)
- Elevation: 420 m (1,380 ft)

Population (2026-01-01)
  - Total: 1,305
  - Density: 142/km^{2} (369/sq mi)
- Time zone: UTC+1 (CET)
  - Summer (DST): UTC+2 (CEST)
- Postal code: 739 81
- Website: www.obecmilikov.cz

Milíkov (Polish: Milików) is a municipality and village in Frýdek-Místek District in the Moravian-Silesian Region of the Czech Republic. It has about 1,300 inhabitants. The municipality has a significant Polish minority.

== Etymology ==
The name is either derived from the word milíř (i.e. 'charcoal pile') or from personal name Milik.

== Geography ==
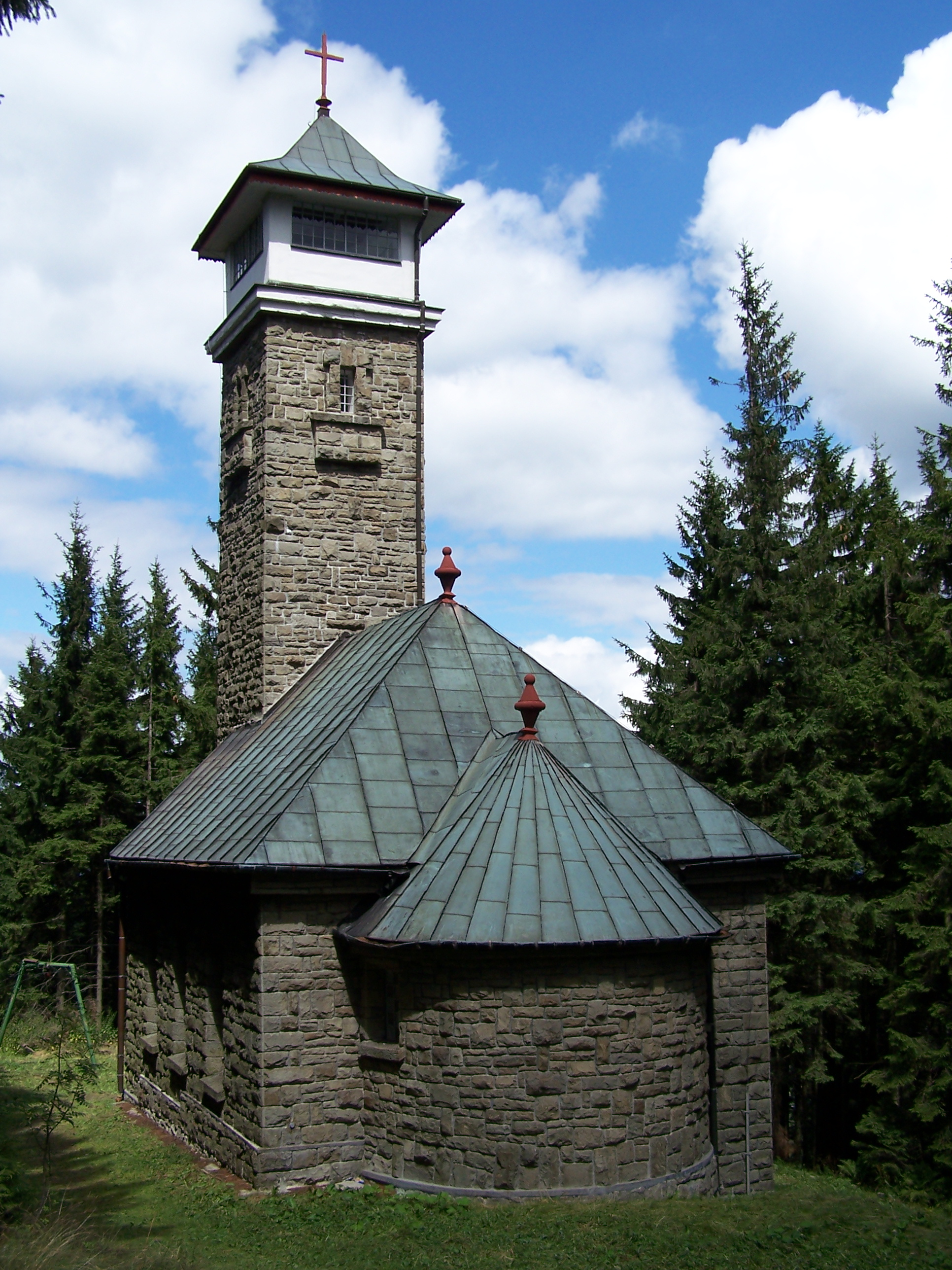
Chapel of Saint Anne on Kozubová

Milíkov is located about 28 kilometres (17 mi) southeast of Frýdek-Místek and 39 km (24 mi) southeast of Ostrava. It lies in the historical region of Cieszyn Silesia. The northern part of the municipality lies in the Jablunkov Furrow, the southern part is located in the Moravian-Silesian Beskids. More than one third of the municipality is covered by forest and two thirds are part of the Beskydy Landscape Protected Area. The highest point is the Kozubová mountain at 981 m (3,219 ft) above sea level, located on the southwestern municipal border.

== History ==
Milíkov was first mentioned in 1577 as Milikuw, when it belonged then to the Duchy of Teschen, a fee of the Kingdom of Bohemia and a part of the Habsburg monarchy.

After Revolutions of 1848 in the Austrian Empire a modern municipal division was introduced in the re-established Austrian Silesia. The village as a municipality was subscribed to the political district of Teschen and the legal district of Jablunkau. According to the censuses conducted in 1880–1910 the population of the municipality grew from 676 in 1880 to 771 in 1910 with a majority being native Polish-speakers (99.3% in 1880, then 100%) accompanied by 5 German-speaking in 1880. In terms of religion in 1910 the majority were Protestants (62.1%), followed by Roman Catholics (37.9%).

After World War I, Polish–Czechoslovak War and the division of Cieszyn Silesia in 1920, Milíkov became a part of Czechoslovakia. Following the Munich Agreement, in October 1938 together with the Trans-Olza region it was annexed by Poland, administratively adjoined to Cieszyn County of Silesian Voivodeship. It was then annexed by Nazi Germany at the beginning of World War II. After the war it was restored to Czechoslovakia.

From 1980 to 1990, Milíkov was a municipal part of Bystřice.

== Demographics ==
According to the 2021 Census, Polish minority makes up 26.8% of the population.

Historical population

Year	Pop.	±%
1869	738	—
1880	676	−8.4%
1890	725	+7.2%
1900	782	+7.9%
1910	771	−1.4%

Year	Pop.	±%
1921	862	+11.8%
1930	1,030	+19.5%
1950	992	−3.7%
1961	1,192	+20.2%
1970	1,186	−0.5%

Year	Pop.	±%
1980	1,297	+9.4%
1991	1,255	−3.2%
2001	1,300	+3.6%
2011	1,275	−1.9%
2021	1,302	+2.1%

Source: Censuses

== Transport ==
There are no railways or major roads passing through the municipality.

== Sights ==
On the mountain Kozubová is the Chapel of Saint Anne with an observation tower. The chapel was built in 1936–1937 and is a site of regular pilgrimages on or around St. Anne's day in July.

== Twin towns – sister cities ==
Milíkov is twinned with:

- Milówka, Poland
