= Košařiska =

Košařiska Koszarzyska
- Municipality
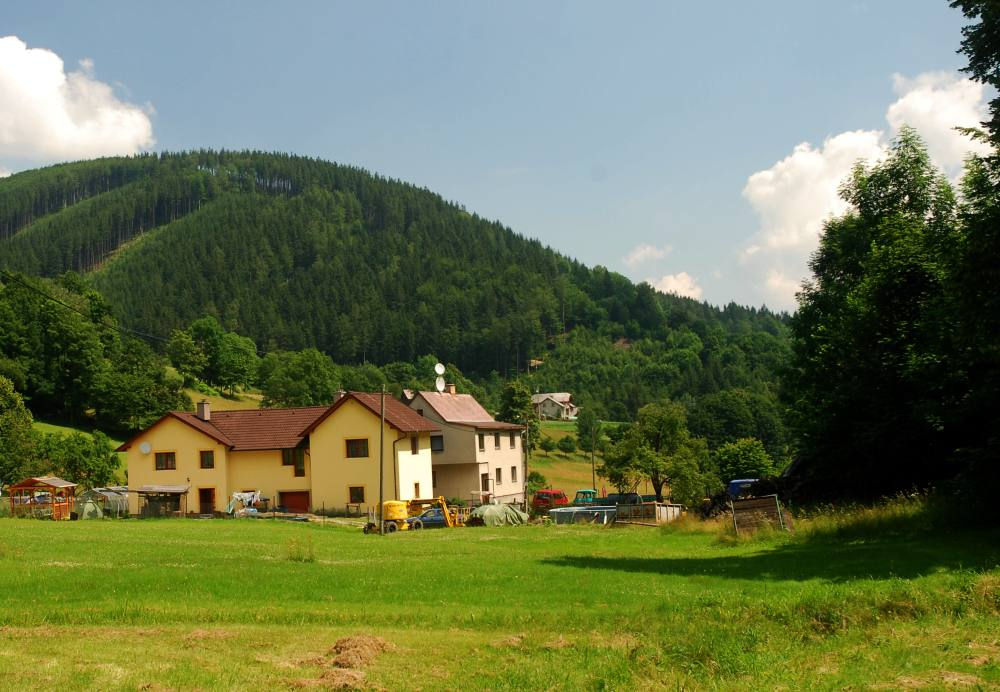
- Milíř, a locality in the village

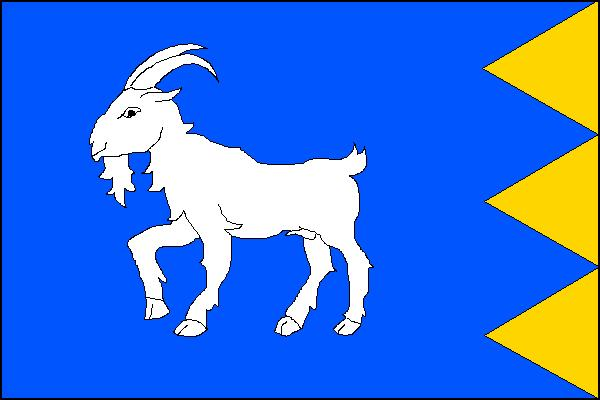
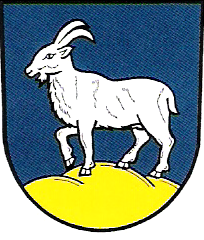
- Flag Coat of arms

- Location in the Czech Republic
- Coordinates: 49°35′24″N 18°41′41″E
- Country: Czech Republic
- Region: Moravian-Silesian
- District: Frýdek-Místek
- First mentioned: 1657

Area
  - Total: 17.18 km^{2} (6.63 sq mi)
- Elevation: 458 m (1,503 ft)

Population (2026-01-01)
  - Total: 361
  - Density: 21.0/km^{2} (54.4/sq mi)
- Time zone: UTC+1 (CET)
  - Summer (DST): UTC+2 (CEST)
- Postal code: 739 81
- Website: www.kosariska.cz

Košařiska (Polish: Koszarzyska) is a municipality and village in Frýdek-Místek District in the Moravian-Silesian Region of the Czech Republic. It has about 400 inhabitants. The municipality has a significant Polish minority.

== Etymology ==
The name of the village is derived from the word koszarzysko / košor denoting a place where a koszar (movable fence to pen sheep used by Goral shepherds) was placed.

== Geography ==
Košařiska is located about 26 kilometres (16 mi) southeast of Frýdek-Místek and 37 km (23 mi) southeast of Ostrava. It lies in the historical region of Cieszyn Silesia, in the Moravian-Silesian Beskids mountain range. The highest point is the mountain Ostrý at 1,044 m (3,425 ft) above sea level, located on the northern municipal border. A notable mountain is also Kozubová at 981 metres (3,219 ft) on the southern border. The Kopytná Stream flows through the municipality.

== History ==
The settlement of the area began around 1615. The first written mention of Košařiska is from 1657 as Kossarzyska. It belonged then to the Duchy of Teschen, a fee of the Kingdom of Bohemia and a part of the Habsburg monarchy.

After Revolutions of 1848 in the Austrian Empire, a modern municipal division was introduced in the re-established Austrian Silesia. The village as a municipality was subscribed to the political district of Cieszyn and the legal district of Jablunkov. According to the censuses conducted in 1880–1910, the population of the municipality dropped from 480 in 1880 to 471 in 1910 with a majority being native Polish-speakers (between 96.8% and 100%) accompanied by German-speaking people (at most 15 or 3.2% in 1880). In terms of religion in 1910 the majority were Protestants (87.7%), followed by Roman Catholics (12.9%).

After World War I, Polish–Czechoslovak War and the division of Cieszyn Silesia in 1920, the municipality became a part of Czechoslovakia. Following the Munich Agreement, in October 1938 together with the Trans-Olza region it was annexed by Poland, administratively adjoined to Cieszyn County of Silesian Voivodeship. It was then annexed by Nazi Germany at the beginning of World War II. After the war it was restored to Czechoslovakia.

== Demographics ==
According to the 2021 Census, Polish minority makes up 26.8% of the population.

Historical population

Year	Pop.	±%
1869	489	—
1880	480	−1.8%
1890	487	+1.5%
1900	470	−3.5%
1910	471	+0.2%

Year	Pop.	±%
1921	442	−6.2%
1930	489	+10.6%
1950	389	−20.4%
1961	424	+9.0%
1970	412	−2.8%

Year	Pop.	±%
1980	392	−4.9%
1991	372	−5.1%
2001	365	−1.9%
2011	354	−3.0%
2021	343	−3.1%

Source: Censuses

== Transport ==
There are no railways or major roads passing through the municipality.

== Sights ==
There are no protected cultural monuments in the municipality.

== Twin towns – sister cities ==
Košařiska is twinned with:

- Dunajov, Slovakia
- Rajcza, Poland
