= Fathom =

Unit of length

fathom
- Standard units in Regensburg: the metal rods are (from left to right) a fathom (klafter), foot (schuch, Modern German Schuh "shoe") and ell (öln, Modern German Elle).

General information
- Unit system: imperial/US units
- Unit of: length

Conversions
1 fathom in ...	... is equal to ...
- imperial/US units: 6 ft
- SI unit equivalent: 1.8288 m

A fathom is a unit of length in the imperial and U.S. customary systems equal to 6 feet (1.8288 m) or two yards. It was used especially for measuring the depth of water. Fathom was the maritime measure of depth in the English-speaking world well into the 20th century, but such charts now use metres with the exception of the United States which still uses fathoms.

The fathom is neither an international standard (SI) unit, nor an internationally accepted non-SI unit.

Originally the span of a man's outstretched arms, the size of a fathom has varied slightly depending on whether it was defined as a thousandth of an (Admiralty) nautical mile or as a multiple of the imperial yard. Formerly, the term was used for any of several units of length varying around 5–5 1/2 feet (1.5–1.7 m).

== Etymology ==
The term (pronounced /ˈfæðəm/) derives (via Middle English fathme) from the Old English fæðm, which is cognate with the Danish word favn and means "embracing arms" or "pair of outstretched arms". It is maybe also cognate with the Old High German word "fadum", which has the same meaning and also means "yarn (originally stretching between the outstretched fingertips)".

== Forms ==
=== Ancient fathoms ===
The Ancient Greek measure known as the orguia (Ancient Greek: ὀργυιά, orgyiá, lit. "outstretched") is usually translated as "fathom". By the Byzantine period, this unit came in two forms: a "simple orguia" (ἁπλὴ ὀργυιά, haplē orguiá) roughly equivalent to the old Greek fathom (6 Byzantine feet, c. 1.87 m) and an "imperial" (βασιλικὴ, basilikē) or "geometric orguia" (γεωμετρικὴ ὀργυιά, geōmetrikē orguiá) that was one-eighth longer (6 feet and a span, c. 2.10 m).

=== International fathom ===
One international fathom is equal to:

- 1.8288 metres exactly (Official international definition of the fathom)

=== British fathom ===
The British Admiralty defined a fathom to be a thousandth of an imperial nautical mile (which was 6,080 ft) or 6.08 feet (1.85 m). In practice, the "warship fathom" of exactly 6 feet (1.8 m) was used in Britain and the United States. Until the 19th century in England, the length of the fathom was more variable: from 5 1/2 feet on merchant vessels to either 5 or 7 feet (1.5 or 2.1 m) on fishing vessels (from 1.7 to 1.5 or 2.1 m).

=== Other definitions ===
Other definitions of fathom include:

- 1.828804 m (Obsolete measurement of the fathom based on the US survey foot, only for use of historical and legacy applications)
- 2 yards exactly
- 18 hands

One metre is about 0.5468 fathoms.

In the international yard and pound agreement of 1959, the United States, Australia, Canada, New Zealand, South Africa, and the United Kingdom defined the length of the international yard to be exactly 0.9144 metre. In 1959, the United States kept the US survey foot as definition for the fathom.

In October 2019, the U.S. National Geodetic Survey and the National Institute of Standards and Technology announced their joint intent to retire the U.S. survey foot, with effect from the end of 2022. The fathom in U.S. Customary units is thereafter defined based on the International 1959 foot, giving the length of the fathom as exactly 1.8288 metres in the United States as well.

== Use of the fathom ==
=== Water depth ===
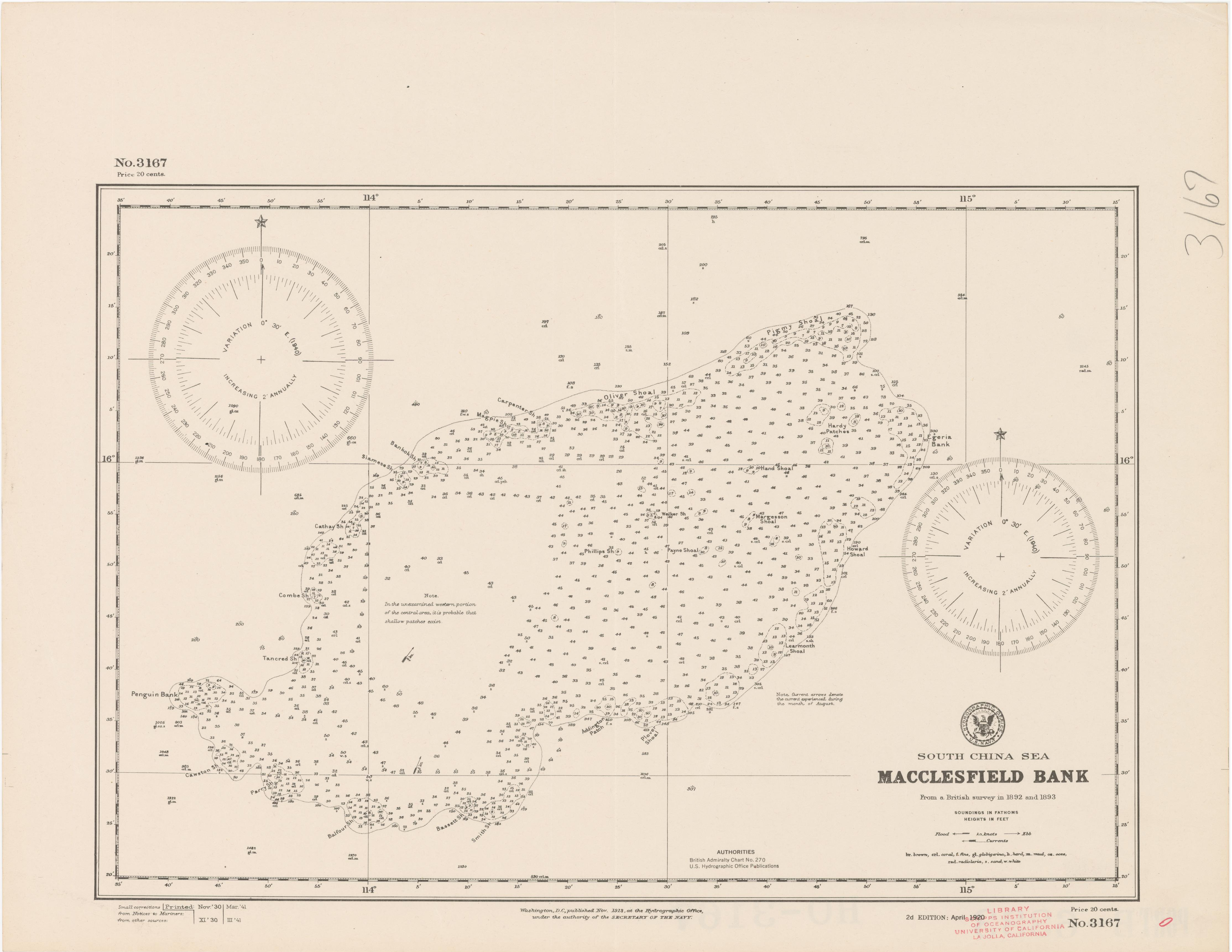
Excerpt of a 1920 map centred at 16°N 114.5°E, a notable focal bank of the South China Sea, with depths in whole fathoms only. The Hydrographic Office highlights hazardous depth shallows (shoals) with dashed lines. Click for broader map and to enable varied magnification.

Most modern nautical charts indicate depth in metres. However, the U.S. Hydrographic Office uses feet and fathoms. A nautical chart will always explicitly indicate the units of depth used.

To measure the depth of shallow waters, boatmen used a sounding line containing fathom points, some marked and others in between, called deeps, unmarked but estimated by the user. Water near the coast and not too deep to be fathomed by a hand sounding line was referred to as in soundings or on soundings. The area offshore beyond the 100 fathom line, too deep to be fathomed by a hand sounding line, was referred to as out of soundings or off soundings. A deep-sea lead, the heaviest of sounding leads, was used in water exceeding 100 fathoms in depth.

This technique has been superseded by sonic depth finders for measuring mechanically the depth of water beneath a ship, one version of which is the Fathometer (trademark). The record made by such a device is a fathogram. A fathom line or fathom curve, a usually sinuous line on a nautical chart, joins all points having the same depth of water, thereby indicating the contour of the ocean floor.

Some extensive flat areas of the sea bottom with constant depth are known by their fathom number, like the Broad Fourteens or the Long Forties, both in the North Sea.

=== Line length ===
The components of a commercial fisherman's setline were measured in fathoms. The rope called a groundline, used to form the main line of a setline, was usually provided in bundles of 300 fathoms. A single 50-fathom (300 ft; 91 m) skein of this rope was referred to as a line. Especially in Pacific coast fisheries, the setline was composed of units called skates, each consisting of several hundred fathoms of groundline, with gangions and hooks attached. A tuck seine or tuck net about 70 fathoms (420 ft; 130 m) long, and very deep in the middle, was used to take fish from a larger seine.

A line attached to a whaling harpoon was about 150 fathoms (900 ft; 270 m). A forerunner—a piece of cloth tied on a ship's log line some fathoms from the outboard end—marked the limit of drift line. A kite was a drag, towed under water at any depth up to about 40 fathoms (240 ft; 73 m), which upon striking bottom, was upset and rose to the surface.

A shot, one of the forged lengths of chain joined by shackles to form an anchor cable, was usually 15 fathoms (90 ft; 27 m).

A shackle, a length of cable or chain equal to 12 1/2 fathoms (75 ft; 22.9 m). In 1949, the British navy redefined the shackle to be 15 fathoms (90 ft; 27 m).

The Finnish fathom (syli) is occasionally used: 1/1000 nautical mile or 1/100 cable length.

=== Burial ===
A burial at sea (where the body is weighted to force it to the bottom) requires a minimum of six fathoms of water. This is the origin of the phrase "to deep six" as meaning to discard, or dispose of.

The phrase is echoed in Shakespeare's The Tempest, where Ariel tells Ferdinand, "Full fathom five thy father lies".

=== On land ===
Until early in the 20th century, it was the unit used to measure the depth of mines (mineral extraction) in the United Kingdom. Miners also use it as a unit of area equal to 6 feet square (3.34 m^{2}) in the plane of a vein. In Britain, it can mean the quantity of wood in a pile of any length measuring 6 feet (1.8 m) square in cross section. In Central Europe, the klafter was the corresponding unit of comparable length, as was the toise in France. In Hungary the square fathom ("négyszögöl") is still in use as an unofficial measure of land area, primarily for small lots suitable for construction.

== See also ==
- Ancient Greek units of measurement
- Anthropic units
- Bathymetry
- English units
- Hvat
- Imperial units
- International System of Units
- Klafter
- Sounding line
- Toise
- United States customary units
