= Kozubová =

- Kozubowa
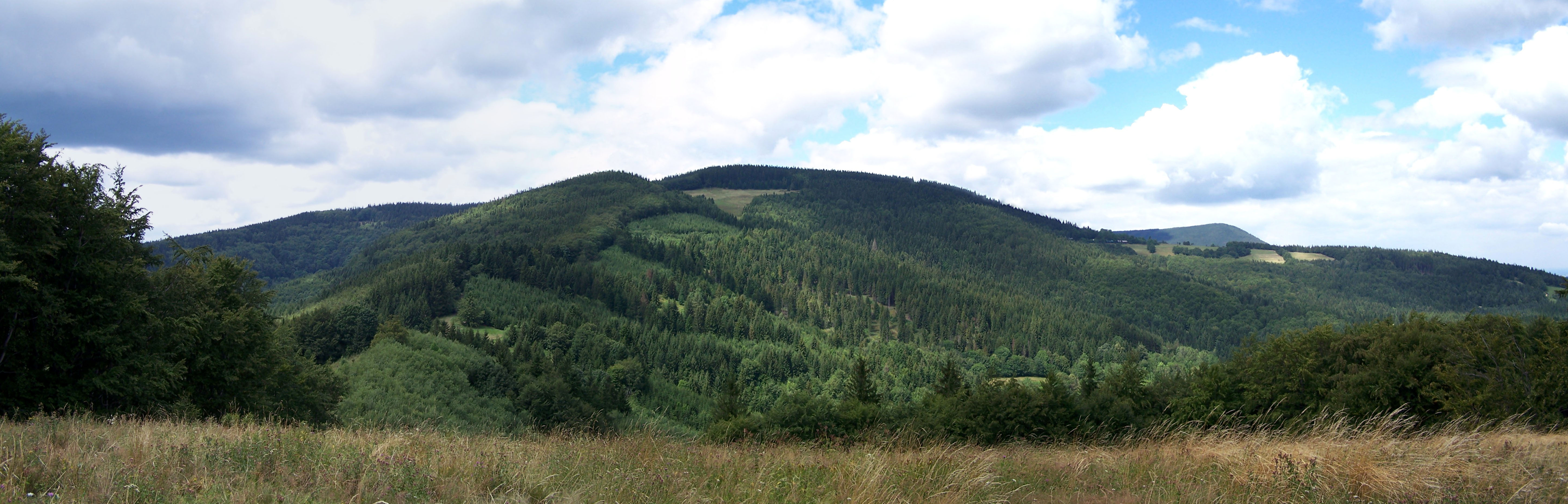
- Kozubová seen from Malá Kykula

Highest point
- Elevation: 981 m (3,219 ft)
- Prominence: 173 m (568 ft)
- Isolation: 3.4 km (2.1 mi)
- Coordinates: 49°34′7″N 18°40′32″E

Geography
- Location within Czech Republic
- Location: Czech Republic
- Parent range: Moravian-Silesian Beskids

Climbing
- Easiest route: Hike

Kozubová (Polish: Kozubowa) is a 981-metre-high (3,219 ft) mountain in the Moravian-Silesian Beskids mountain range, Moravian-Silesian Region, Czech Republic.

Its top is the tripoint of the municipalities of Milíkov, Košařiska, and Dolní Lomná. Several tourist routes lead to Kozubová from this villages and from Bocanovice.

== Etymology ==
According to Jan Korzenny, regional historian from Dolní Lomná, the name of the mountain is derived from surname Kozub. It is said to be a sheep shepherd who led his sheep on the slopes of this mountain.

== Tourism ==
In 1937, a Chapel of Saint Anne was built there. Beskid sandstone was used as a construction material. Main initiator of the building was priest Rudolf Płoszek from Hnojník. It was consecrated on 7 August 1937. More than 10,000 people took part in the event. Since 1937, a church fair occurs here every year at the end of July around the Feast of Saint Anne day. Prominent feature of the chapel is a 15-metre-high (49 ft) tower, serving as a lookout tower during the church fair. Church masses occur only several times a year. At the end of the 1990s, it was reconstructed.

There is a mountain hut on Kozubová. Original wooden hut was built in July 1928-August 1929 on the initiative of Polskie Towarzystwo Turystyczne "Beskid Śląski" (Polish Touristic Society "Silesian Beskids") of the local Polish minority. The project was prepared by architect Edward Dawid. Mountain hut was opened 8 September 1929. During World War II it served mostly to the Hitler Youth, and at the end of war to Wehrmacht units who conducted operations against partisans from the area. The building burnt to the ground on 9 February 1973. Precise investigation evaluated reason of the fire. It was self-ignition of a balk near the chimney. In 1986 new, current hut was built on its place; its architectonic character is, however, completely different from the style of the original one.

== Gallery ==
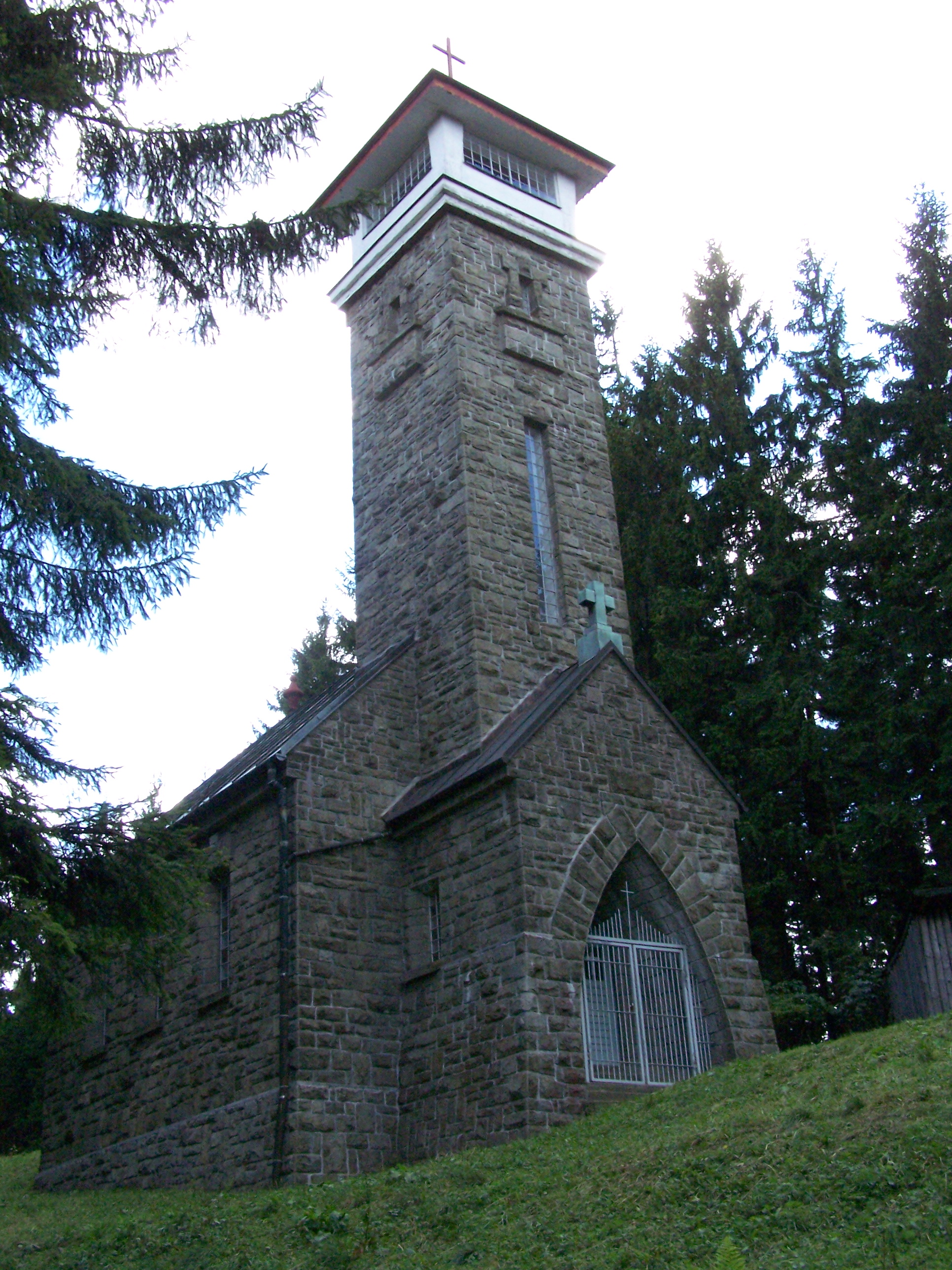
Chapel of Saint Anne

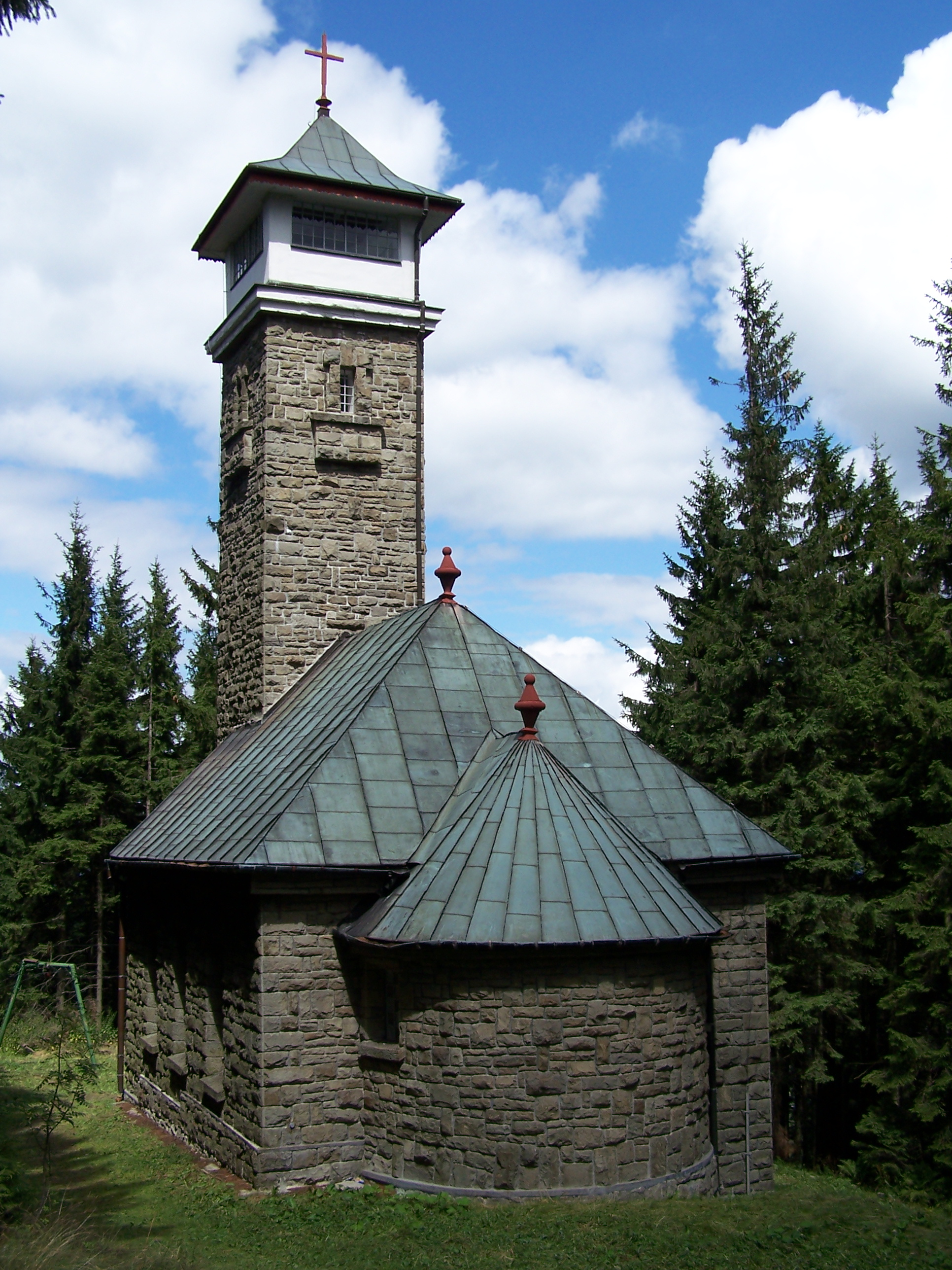
Chapel of Saint Anne

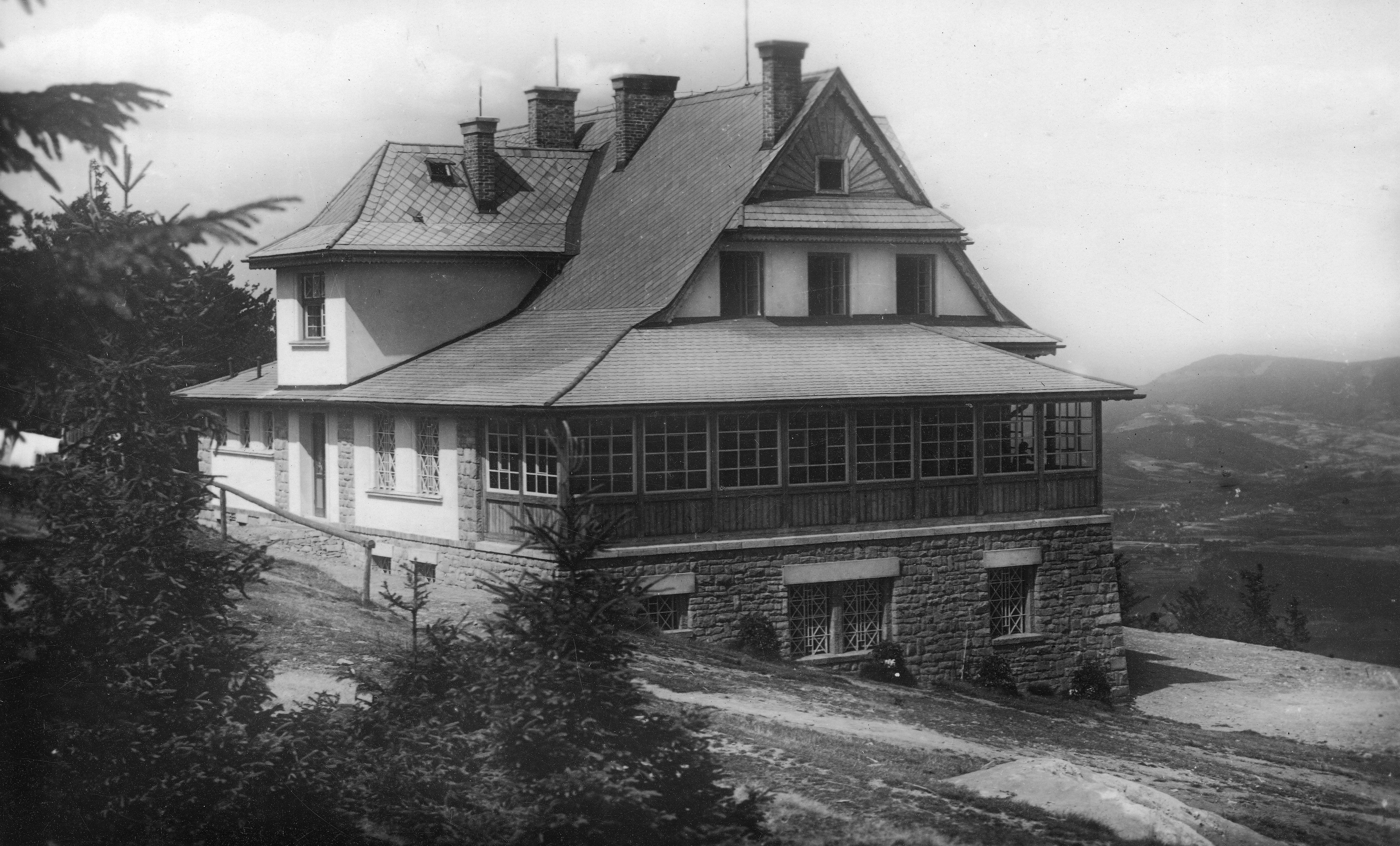
Original mountain hut built in 1929

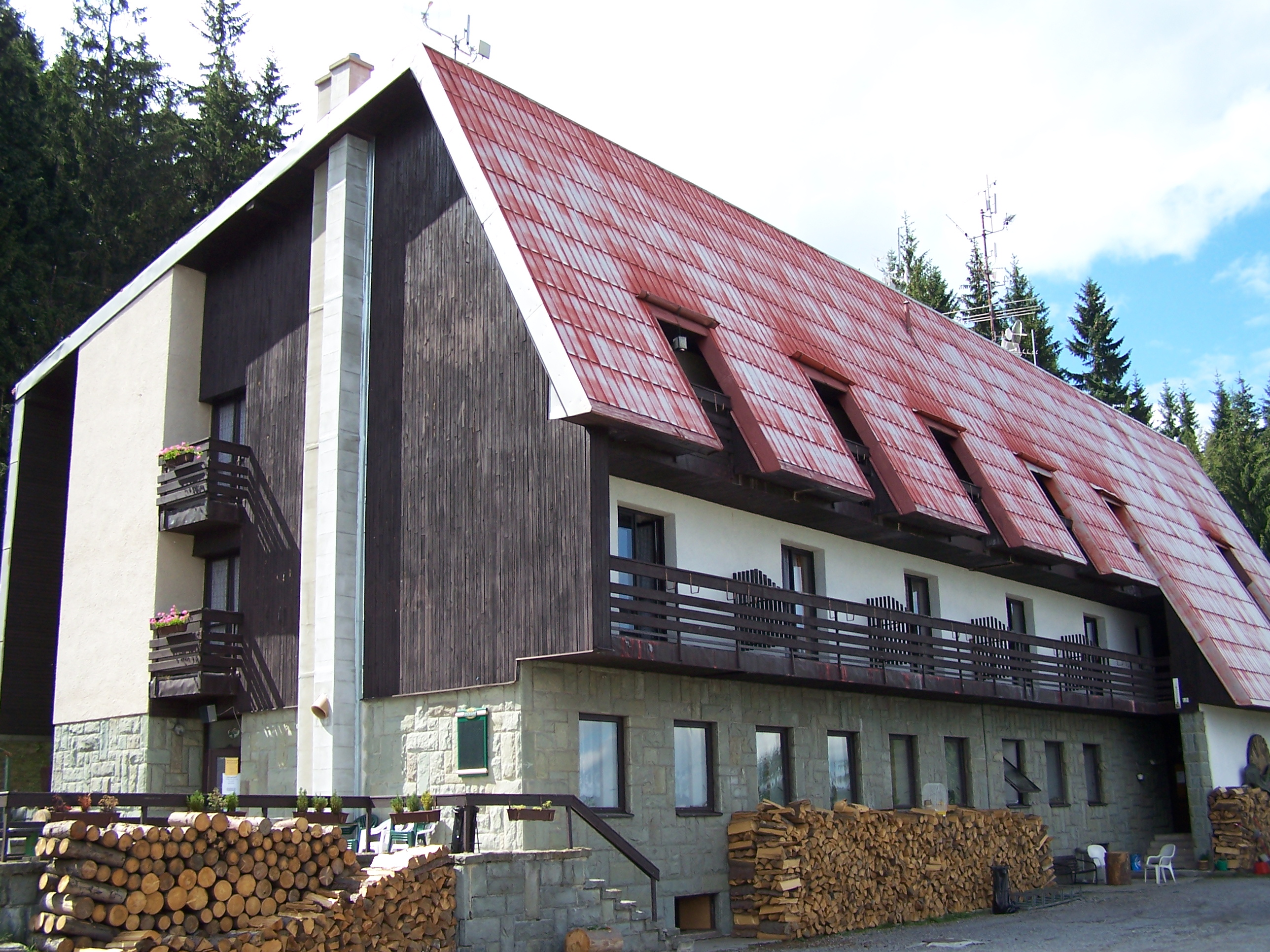
Current mountain hut
