= Charcoal pile =

Covered fire for producing charcoal

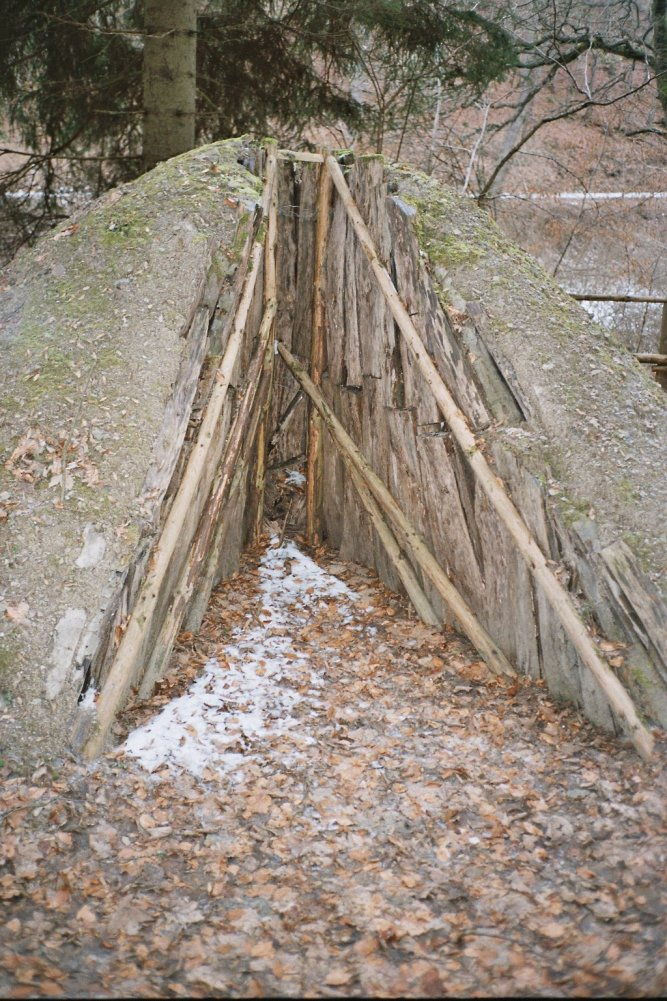
Section through a charcoal pile

A charcoal pile or charcoal clamp is a carefully arranged pile of wood, covered by turf or other layer, inside which a fire is lit in order to produce charcoal. The pile is tended by a charcoal burner. It is similar to a charcoal kiln, but the latter is usually a permanent structure made of materials such as stone.

== History ==
Since antiquity, charcoal piles have been used to make charcoal. Charcoal is much lighter than natural timber and therefore easier to transport. In addition, charcoal generates much more heat. Charcoal production was therefore an important part of the economy in early modern times. At that time, charcoal was the only fuel that could generate the heat necessary for iron smelting. In the late 18th century, it is recorded that the duties of a master coalman at an ironworks were not only to ensure the supply of charcoal and to supervise charcoal burners and their assistants, but also to visit frequently the charcoal clearings (Kohlhäue) i.e. those parts of the forest used to produce charcoal.

In 1713, a process was invented for producing coke suitable for blast furnaces from hard coal (stone coal). From then on, the consumption of the more expensive charcoal decreased steadily despite increasing iron production. From the 17th century onwards, pitch furnaces were increasingly used and in the 19th century retorts were also employed. As a result, fewer and fewer charcoal piles were used. The gradual decline of charcoal began in the 19th century, when hard coal practically replaced charcoal and later also town gas and electricity became more important. The Second World War triggered a strong demand for charcoal again. At that time, motor vehicles were also powered by wood or charcoal.

Today it is of no particular economic importance; in particular due to the loss of wood gases during charcoal production, the calorific value yield from wood is extremely low. Charcoal burning is still used only for traditional reasons and for some special applications of charcoal.

== Operation ==
Video, part 1: construction of a charcoal pile (commentary in German)

Video, part 2: burning and clearing of a charcoal pile (commentary in German)

In order to produce charcoal, water and the volatile components of the wood have to evaporate. At the charcoal burning site, which is located where possible near a body of water so that it can be extinguished later, the wood pile is built in approximately hemispherical or conical piles, using short logs, mostly one-metre long, in even fashion (standing or lying down), around the central chimney (Quandel). A bank of ash and earth (Stübbewall) can be built all round the pile.

On top of this an airtight roof is constructed of dry fir branches, leaves, hay or straw, or alternatively of grass, vegetation and moss. Finally the pile is sealed airtight with a mix of ash and charcoal pieces (possibly known as 'culm' or 'brusque'; German: Lösche, Stübbe, Stibbe or Gestübe) and earth, with the exception of the central chimney. A support made of logs and planks is then built round the base of the pile. Then the pile is ignited via the chimney which is then also sealed.

A sure sign that the charring has started is the so-called 'knocking' of the pile; the intense heat causes deflagration of wood gas which, if the covering of the pile is too strong, can lead to an explosion. At the top as well as at the foot of the pile, individual holes are made in the surface, by means of which the fire in the pile is regulated. Under this blanket, incineration is conducted with carefully regulated air access in such a way that, if possible, no more wood burns than is absolutely necessary to heat the entire wood mass to the charring temperature. The wood must char, not burn, inside the pile; air being let in through the small holes so that no fire can start. But it creates a lot of heat and the water evaporates, tar condenses on the green roof, the smoke is yellowish-white and odourless. The heat of the smouldering wood inside the pile drives all liquid and volatile organic components out of the wood as smoke.

The job of the charcoal burner at this stage is to neither let the pile go out nor let it burn down as a result of too much air over the following days or weeks (depending on the size of the pile and the weather). To do this, he drills and closes the air holes. Essentially, only the gases and vapours that develop from the heated wood should burn. By observing the smoke and its colour, the charcoal burner knows whether there is too much or too little air. The colour of the smoke that escapes indicates whether charring is complete. If the smoke is white and dense, the wood is not yet charred. If it is light, almost transparent and slightly bluish, the wood is charred. The air holes are now moved further down in order to also draw the fire into the lower areas of the kiln. Each time the draft holes are moved, the smoke colour changes, the kiln charred from top to bottom. As the charring progresses, the kiln slowly sinks in.

Once charring is complete, the fire in the pile is quickly extinguished by the clogging of the air holes, and the pile slowly begins to cool down. For better sealing, pile is often sprinkled with water and compacted with a wooden hammer. The pile has now shrunk to about half its original volume. Now the cover is opened and then the coal is pulled out with a rake, fork or shovel and spread out to cool down. Embers are extinguished with water or smothered with ash. If this is not done properly, the charcoal that has been produced burns within a very short time under great heat (exothermic reaction). The heat generated in this process is so great that it is impossible to approach the pile. The coal must now cool down for at least 12 hours. If the charcoal is too small it remains in the pile and is mixed with the ash. Only the carbon skeleton of the wood cells remains but this is still 98% of the wood. From 100 kg of hardwood, approximately 30 kg of charcoal can be obtained.

During charcoal production, by-products are generated such as wood tar, wood vinegar, wood spirit and wood gas. These cannot be fully utilised in the pile. If tar extraction was to be combined with the charring of the pile, small pits were made in the ground or the ground was lined with clay and the tar led out of the pile by means of a channel, and the wood vinegar was treated with iron or copper. Pipes led into a reservoir or wall-supported piles built on sloping ground.

== Gallery ==
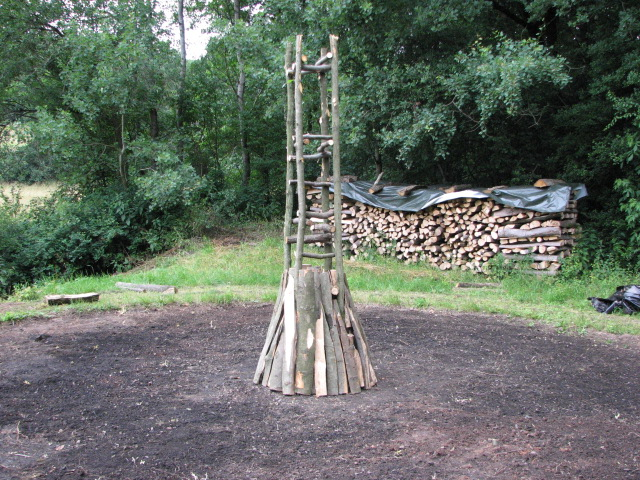
Heart (Kern or Quandel) of the charcoal pile on an old Meilerplatz

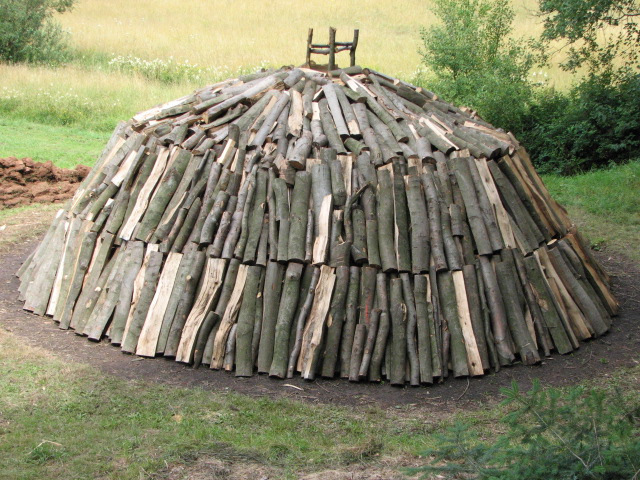
Layer of beech wood around the heart

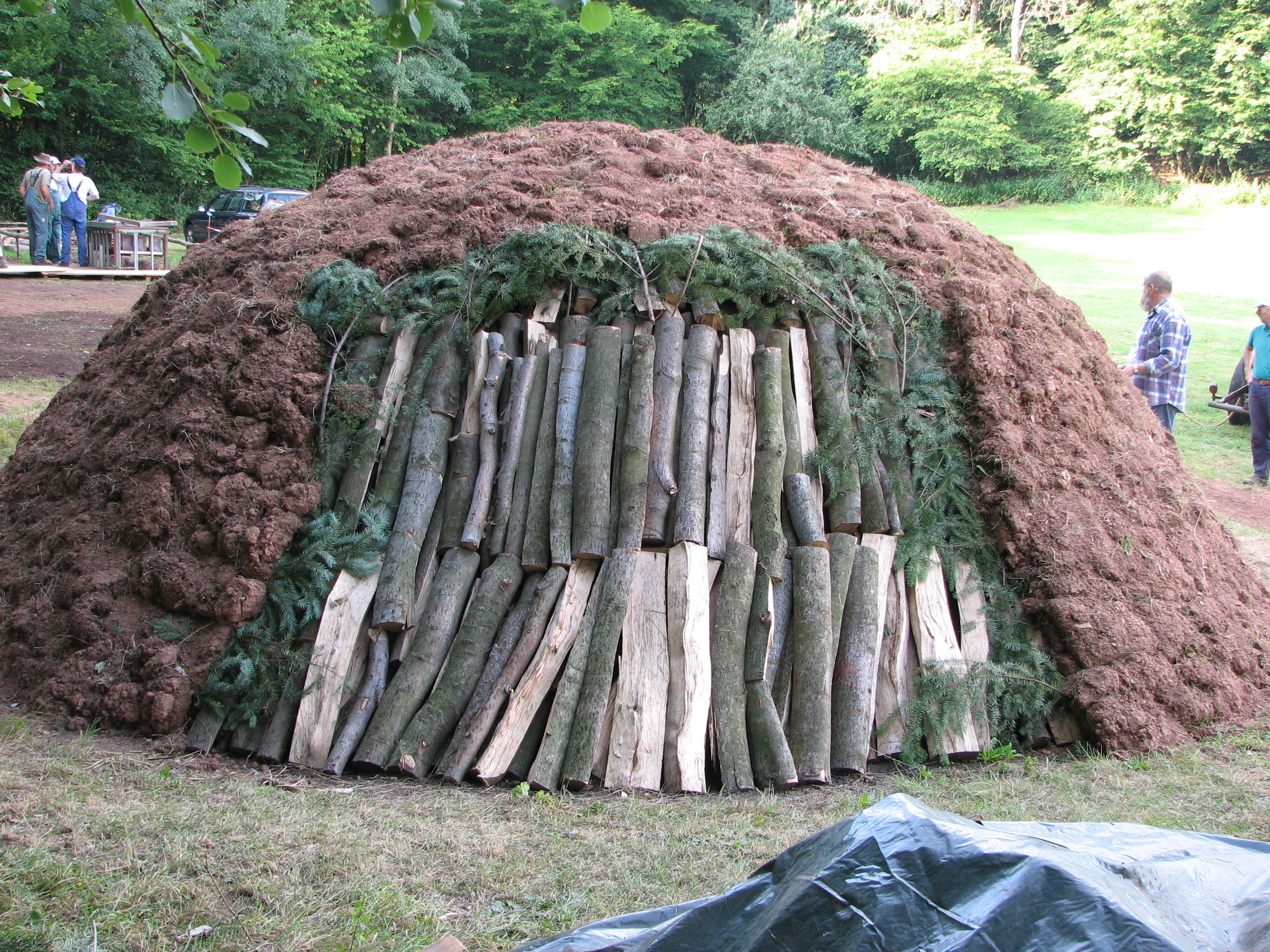
Pile with various layers (wood, spruce brushwood (Fichtenreisig), grass sods)

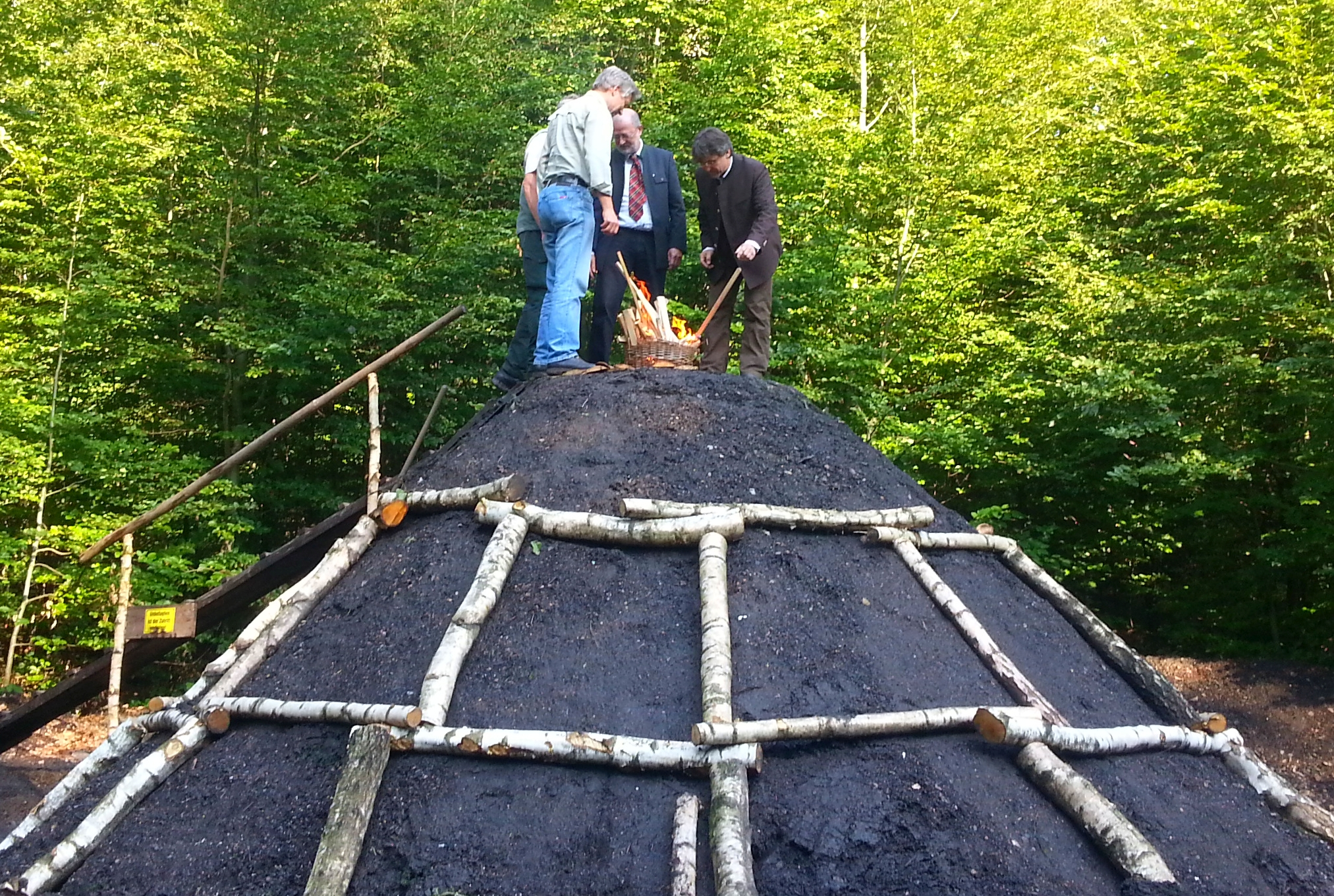
Lighting of a charcoal pile by honorary guests at a Meilerfest (2014)

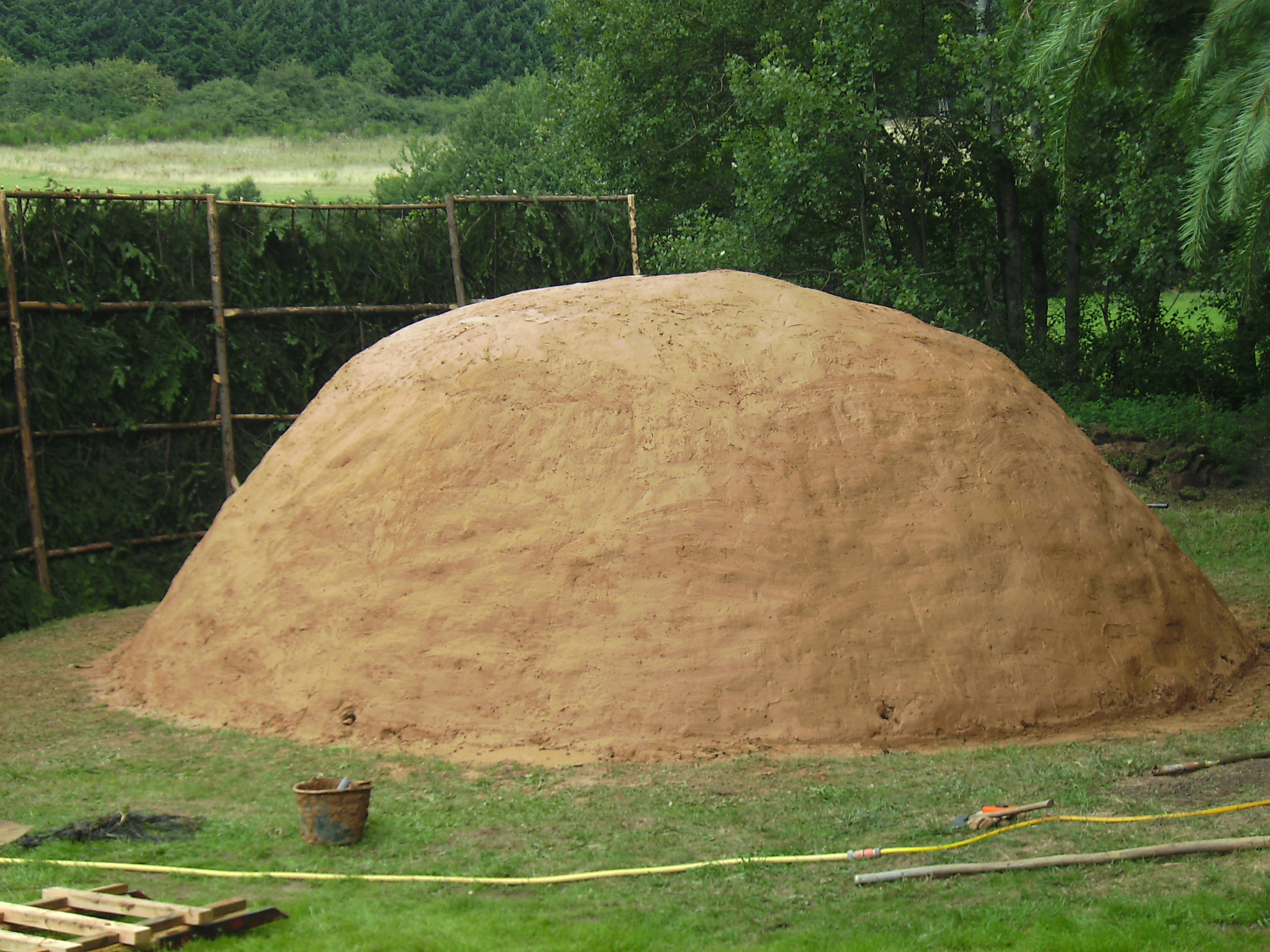
Covered with loam, ready for firing

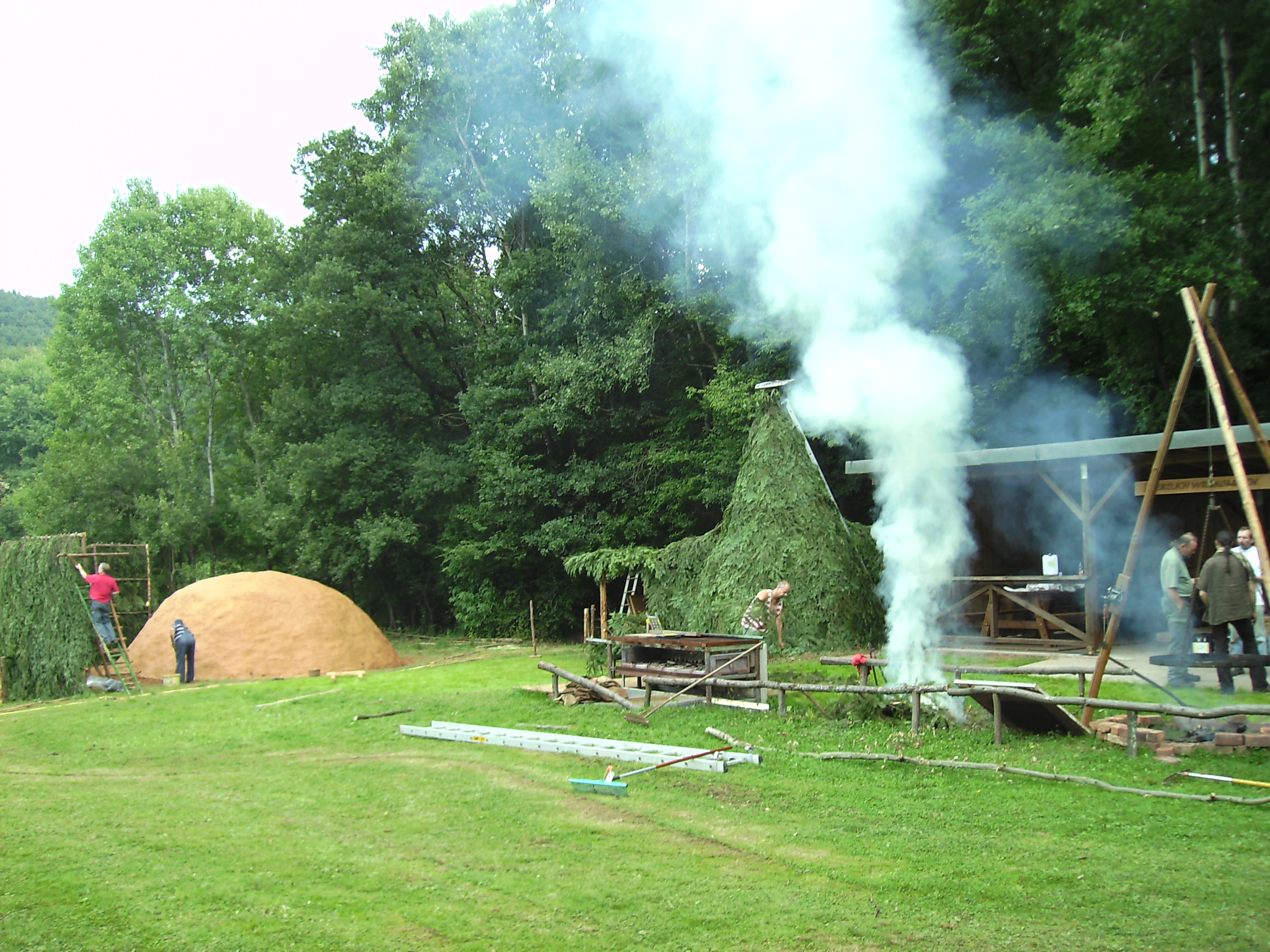
Finished pile with windbreak, charcoal burner’s hut and fireplace

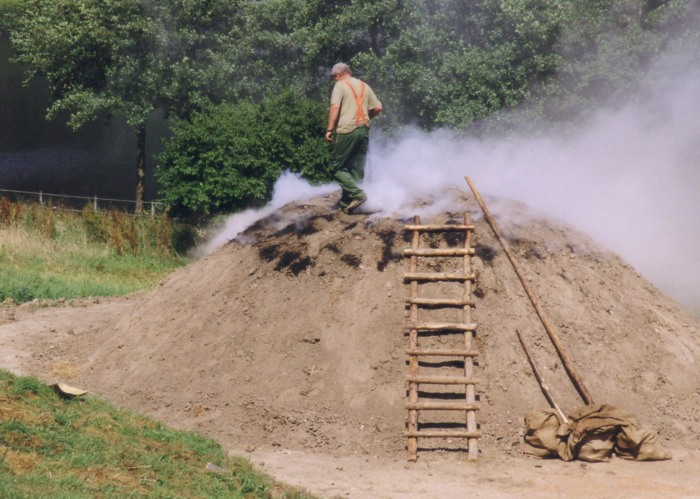
Charcoal pile in the Westphalian Open Air Museum, Hagen

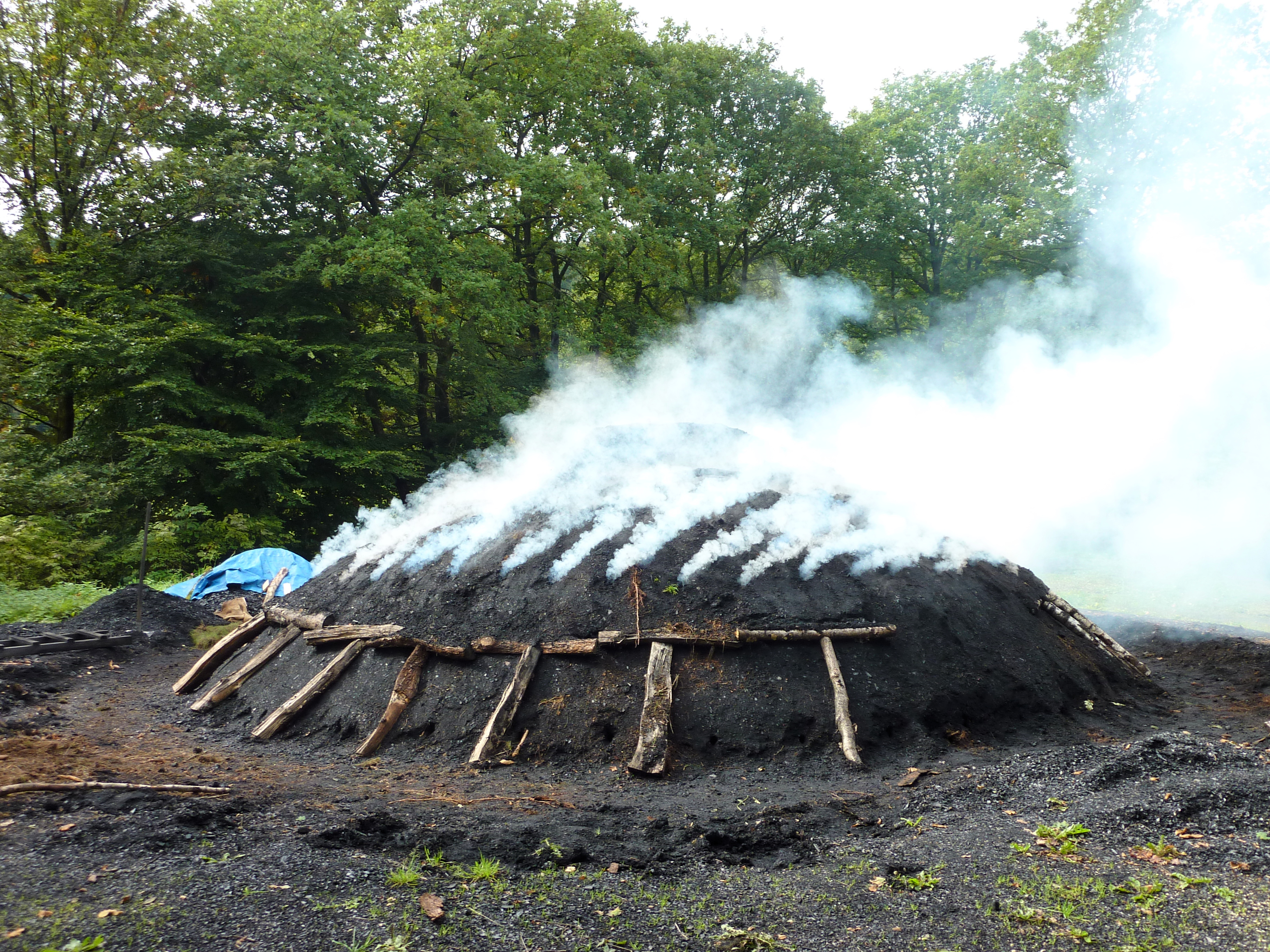
Charcoal pile in Walpersdorf, one of the last in the Siegerland

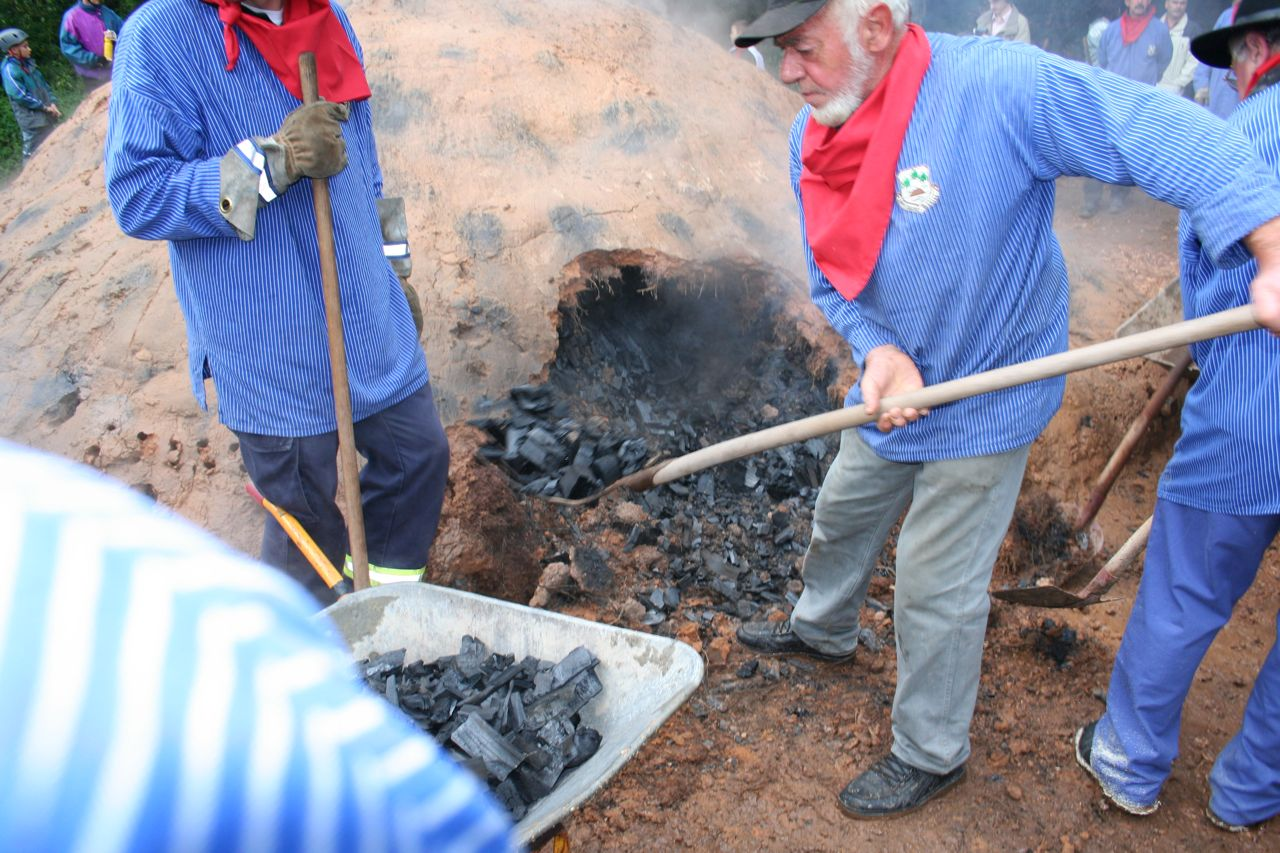
Opening of the charcoal pile

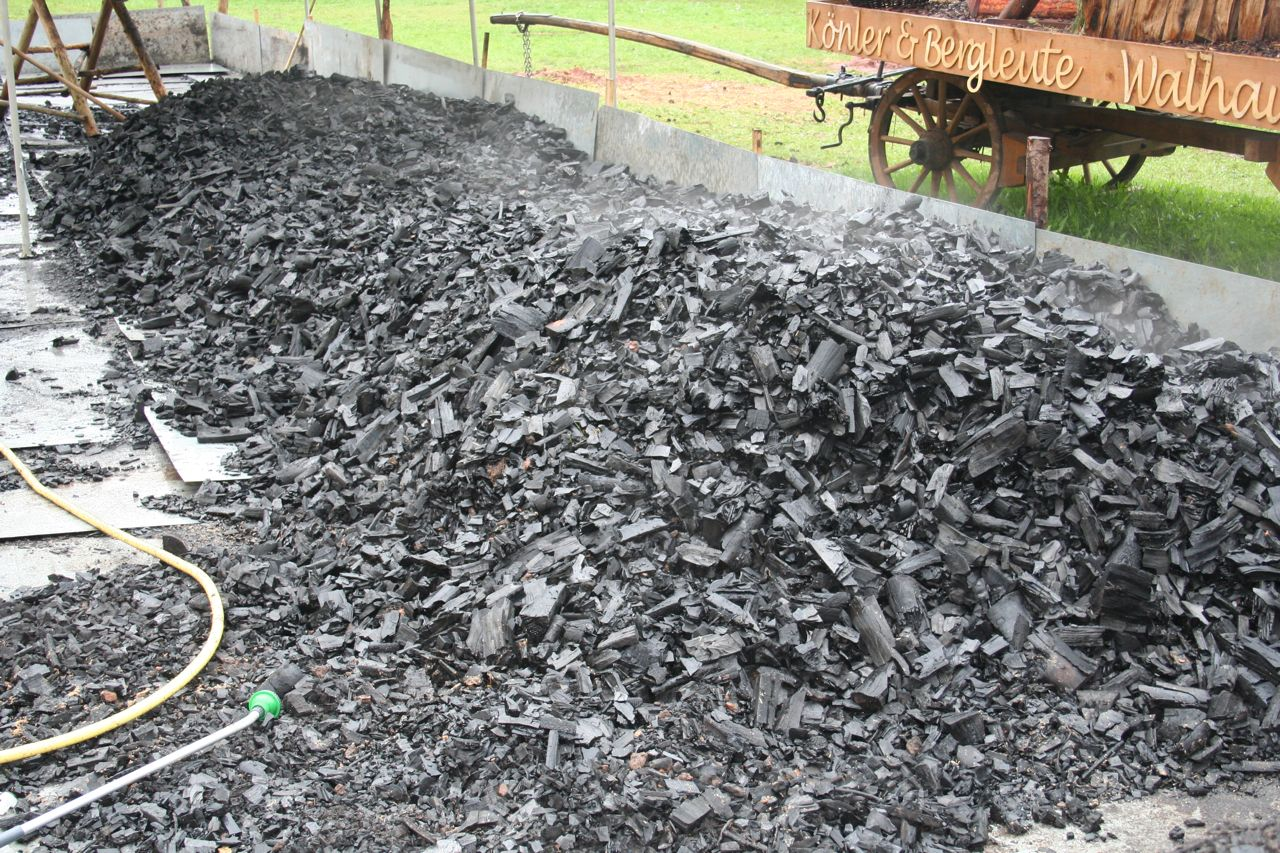
Charcoal product

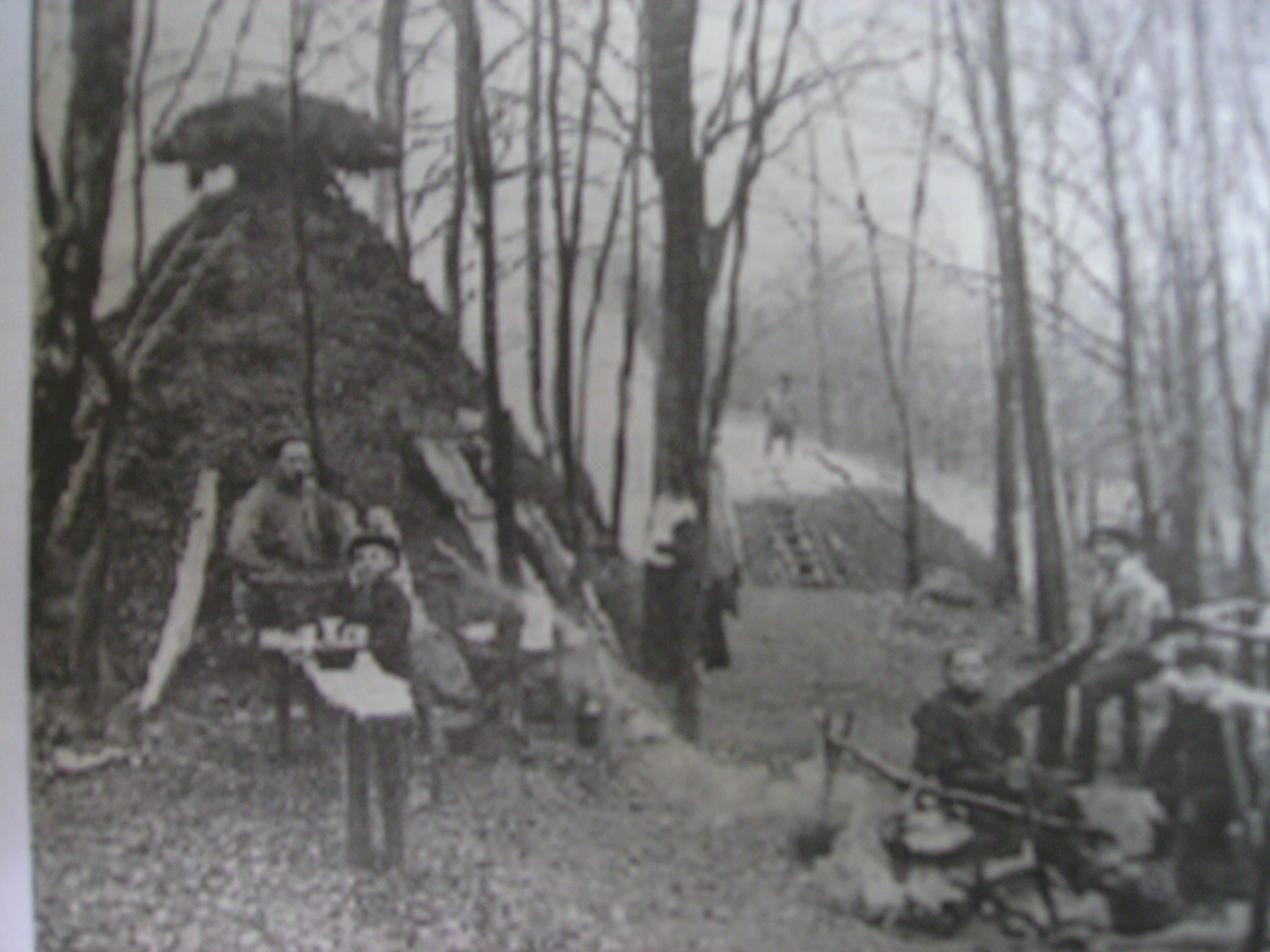
Charcoal burners at work (turn of the 19th/20th centuries)

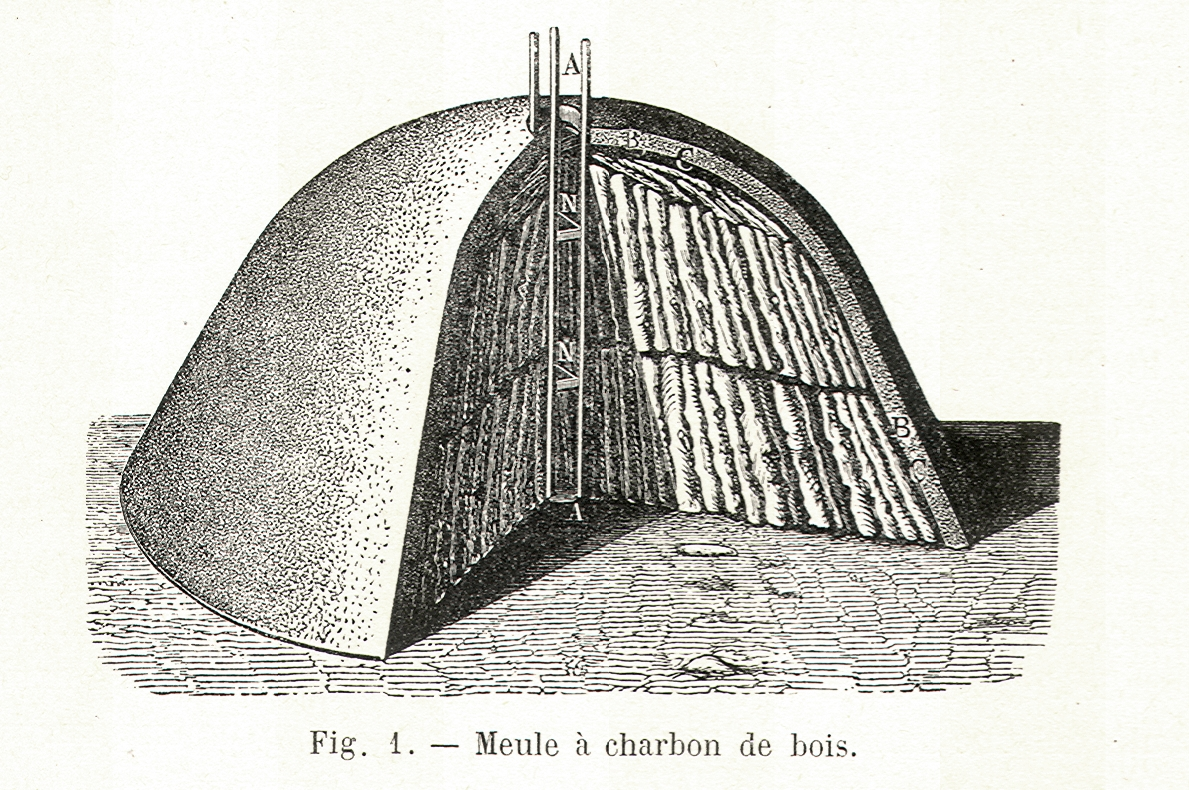
Section of a charcoal pile

A red charcoal pile in the coat of arms of Kullaa

== Literature ==
- Karl Hasel, Ekkehard Schwartz: Forstgeschichte. Ein Grundriss für Studium und Praxis. 2., aktualisierte Auflage. Kessel, Remagen, 2002, ISBN 3-935638-26-4
- Richard B. Hilf: Der Wald. Wald und Weidwerk in Geschichte und Gegenwart – Erster Teil [Reprint]. Aula, Wiebelsheim, 2003, ISBN 3-494-01331-4
- Hildebrandt, H., Heuser-Hildebrandt, B. and Stumböck, M.(2001): Bestandsgeschichtliche und kulturlandschaftsgenetische Untersuchungen im Naturwaldreservat Stelzenbach, Forstamt Nassau, Revier Winden. Mainzer Naturwissenschaftliches Archiv, Beiheft 25, 83 S., Mainz.
- Mezler, Johann Bendikt (1788). "Staat- und Pflichtvorhaltung eines Kohlenmeisters bei einem Eisenwerk" [State and Occupational Duties of a Master Coalman at an Ironworks]. Forst und Jagdbibliothek oder nüzliche Aufsäze, Bemerkungen und Verordnungen etc. das gesammte wirthschaftliche Forst-Jagd-Holz- und Floz-Wesen betreffend. Stuttgart.. A continuation of the general forestry magazine. Part One.
- Seymour, John (1984). The forgotten crafts (First American ed.). New York. ISBN 0394539567.
