= Klafter =

Historical unit of measurement

Measures of length: the Schuh, Elle and Klafter at the Altes Rathaus, Regensburg

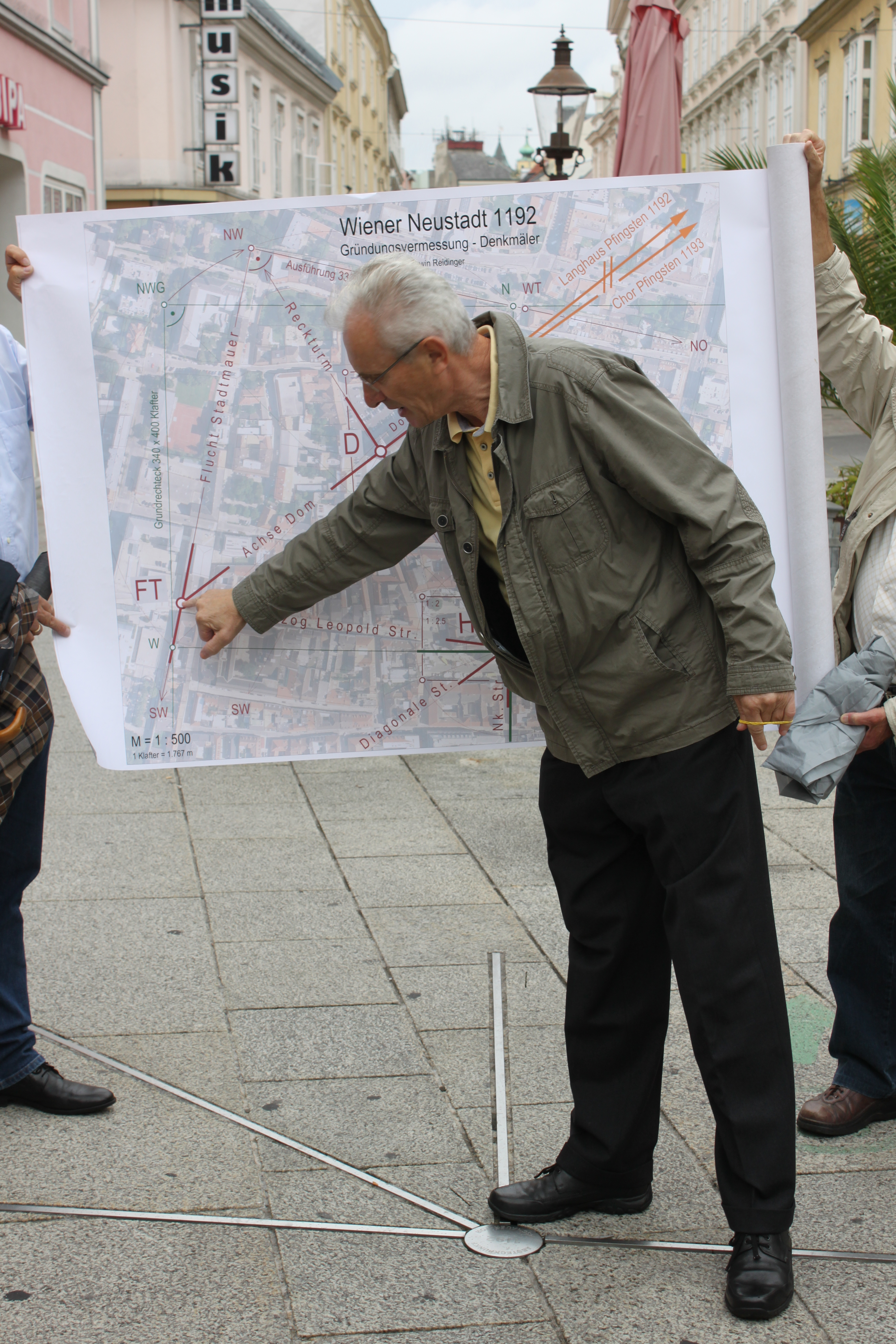
Erwin Reidinger explains the land survey of Wiener Neustadt at Point 1192 near the old Fischauer Gate. The symbolic survey lines on the pavement were measured in klafters.

The klafter is an historical unit of length, volume and area that was used in Central Europe.

== Unit of length ==
As a unit of length, the klafter was derived from the span of a man's outstretched arms and was traditionally about 1.80 metres (m). In Austria, its length was, for example, 1.8965 m, in Prussia 1.88 m. In Bavaria, however, a klafter was only 1.751155 m, in Hesse it was significantly larger at 2.50 m. The Viennese or Lower Austrian klafter was fixed by Rudolf II as a measure of length as of 19 August 1588. When, in 1835, the Swiss units were defined using the metric system, 1 Swiss klafter (of 6 Swiss feet each of 0.30 m) corresponded exactly to 1.80 m.

In Aachen, Baden, Bavaria, Bohemia, Hamburg, Leipzig, Poland, Trier and Zürich the klafter was exactly six feet, but in the Canton of Fribourg it measured 10 feet.

In nautical units of depth, the klafter corresponds to the fathom.

=== Baseline ===
The survey of Austria-Hungary began in 1762 with the construction of the Vienna Neustadt Baseline (Wiener Neustädter Grundlinie) which was 6410, later 5000, klafters long, represented by 5 measuring rods of 1 klafter in length made of varnished wood.

== Unit of volume ==
The old unit of dry volume for split firewood, or Scheitholz, was based on this unit of length. A klafter of wood corresponded to a stack of wood with a length and height of one klafter; the depth of this pile corresponded to the length of the log but, as a rule was 3 feet long, that is 0.5 klafters. The volume of a pile of logs was therefore only 0.5 cubic klafters. This in turn corresponded, depending on the area, to 3 to 4 steres or approximately 2 to 3 m^{3} of wood. The old Prussian klafter corresponded to 3.339 m^{3}; in Austria, a klafter was equivalent to 3.386 m^{3}. By comparison the North American cord, used to measure firewood and pulpwood, is slightly larger at 3.62 m^{3}.

In Switzerland, Werdenfelser Land and parts of Lower Franconia, a klafter of logs corresponds to 3.0 m^{3} (steres) of stacked firewood since the introduction of the metric system. Usually the logs are 1 m long. One klafter of firewood is thus equivalent to about 2.2 m^{3}.

Hay was also sometimes measured in klafters in the 19th century.

The cubic klafter was not standardised as the length of a foot varied depending on the region. The cubic klafter used for wood could also differ. Here is an example of the Austrian units.

- 1 foot (Viennese) = 140.131 Paris lines = 0.3161 metres
- 1 cubic klafter (Viennese) = 216 cubic feet = 6.8224 cubic metres

The cubic foot generally had 1728 cubic inches, each with 1728 cubic lines, each with 1728 cubic points.

- 1 cubic klafter (Viennese) = 6 cubic klafter feet of 12 cubic klafter inches of 12 cubic klafter lines of 12 cubic klafter points
- 216 cubic feet of 1728 cubic inches of 1728 cubic lines etc.
- 1 Viennese cubic klafter = 6.82234457176 cubic metres
- 1 cubic klafter foot = 1.1370574286 cubic metres
- 1 cubic klafter inch = 94754785.7 cubic millimetres
- 1 cubic klafter line = 7896232.1 cubic millimetre
- 1 cubic klafter point = 658019.3 cubic millimetre
- 1 cubic foot = 0.0315749412 cubic metres
- 1 cubic inch = 18249.3 cubic millimetres
- 1 cubic line = 10.56 cubic millimetres

The Rahmklafter, as the unit of timber measurement was called in Austria, was defined for long and short firewood as follows:

- 1 Rahmklafterof long firewood = 6 feet long and 6 feet high, 1 1/4 ells of log length, about 111 cubic feet
- 1 Rahmklafterof short firewood = 6 feet long and 6 feet high, 1 ell of log length, about 90 cubic feet

Two klafters were counted for one Stoß or livestock unit.

== Unit of area ==
In Austria, 1 yoke (Joch, with which the size of fields was measured) comprised 1,600 square klafters with sides measuring 8 by 200 klafters, thus about 5,754 m^{2} and 0.575 ha, respectively. 1 square klafter (Viennese) was equivalent to 3.5979 square metres.

In Croatia, the square klafter was used as unit of area and equalled 3.596652 m^{2}. It is sometimes still used today.

In the Swiss Chur Rhine Valley and the Prättigau, the meadowland was measured in klafters.

In the adjoining Principality of Liechtenstein, the square klafter is still used today for the measurement of land areas. 1 m^{2} equals 0.27804 square klafters, 1 square klafter equals 3.59665 m^{2}. The klafter as a unit of length was consequently about 1.8965 metres long.

In Darmstadt, 1 square klafter = 100 square feet = 10000 square inches = 6.25 square metres.

== Similar units in other countries ==
Conversion table of 1838

- Canton of Neuchâtel, Canton of Bern (French-speaking part)
  - 1 toise = 10 feet (pieds)
- Canton of Valais (French-speaking part)
  - 1 klafter = 6 French feet (pieds de roi)
- Canton of Vaud (metric based from 1822)
  - 1 toise = 10 feet (pieds) = 3.00 metres
  - 1 toise carrée (square) = 100 square feet = 9.00 square metres
  - 1 toise cube or toise courante (cubic) = 1000 cubic feet = 27 cubic metres
- Canton of Ticino
  - 1 spazzo = 6 feet (piedi) = 1.808 metres
  - 1 tesa = 6 feet (piedi) = 1.80 metres (introduced in 1851)
- France
  - 1 toise usuelle = 6 pieds = 2 metres = 1.026148 Parisian toise (old)
- Piedmont during the French reign
  - 1 tesa = 5 piedi manuali = 759.17 Paris lines = 3.0826 metres
- Milan under French occupation
  - 1 Cavese di Modena, Modenese klafter = 6 Modenese feet (1 foot = 281.2 Paris lines = 0.63433 m)
- Russia
  - 1 sazhen = 3 arshin = 2.13356 metres
- Poland
  - 1 sążeń = 8 feet
- Spain and former colonies
  - 1 toesa, braza, estado = 2 varas = 6 pies
- Portugal, also Brazil (value deviating)
  - 1 braça = 2 varas = 8 polegadas
- Italy, Spain, France, North Coast Africa
  - 1 cañe, xanne (great ell)

== See also ==
- Cord (unit), North American measure of timber volume
- Hoppus, British unit of timber volume
- Orders of magnitude (length)
- Toise, French six-foot unit of length
- Yoke (unit of measurement)
