= Stopa =

Stopa is a Polish language surname, with the English meaning of "foot". Notable people with the surname include:

- Jacek Stopa (born 1987), Polish chess player
- Karol Stopa (born 1948), Polish sports journalist
- Piotr Stopa (born 1971), Polish footballer
- Wanda Stopa (1900–1924), Polish-American attorney and murderer
