= Yoke (unit of measurement) =

Unit of measurement

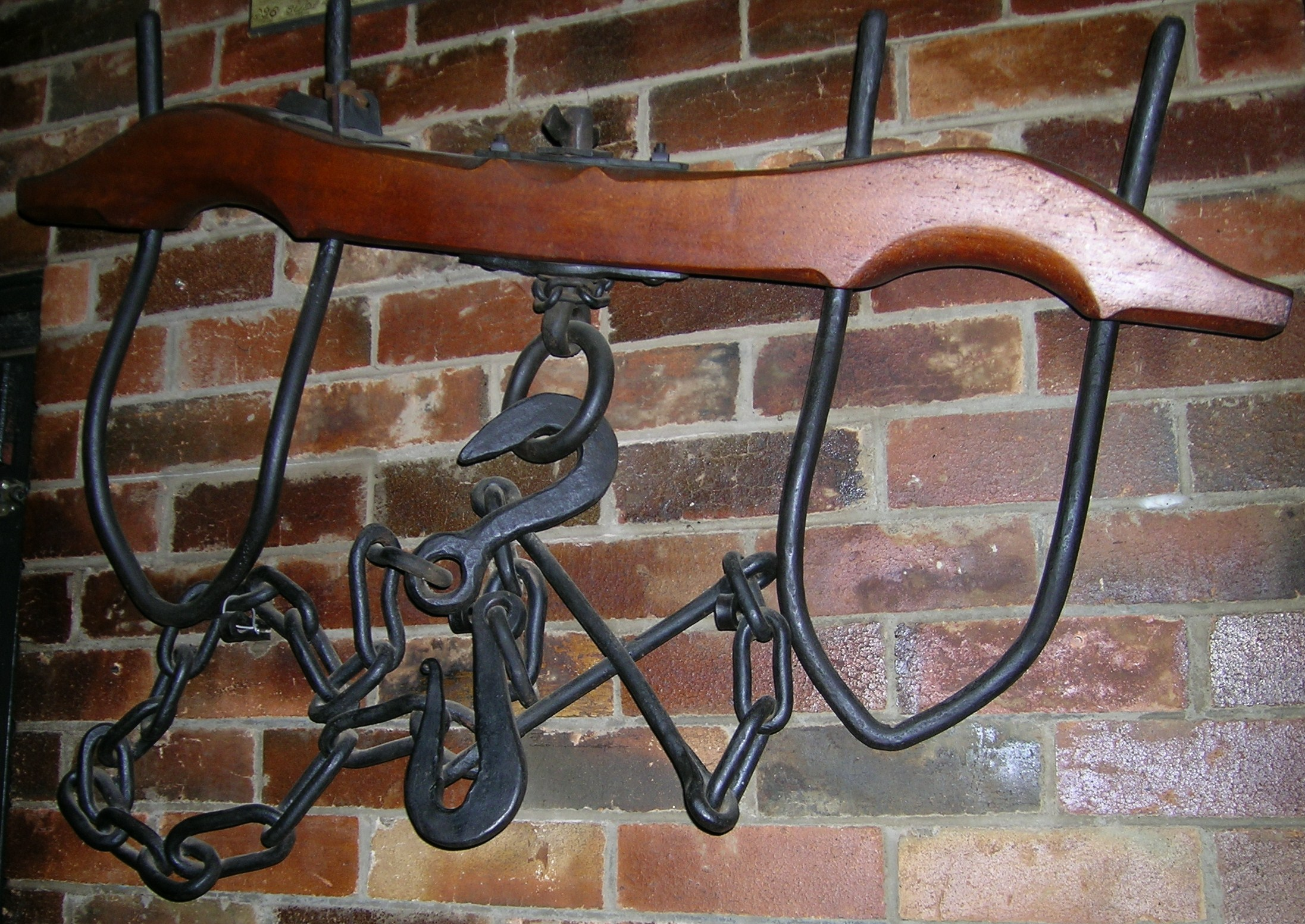
An English wooden yoke, bows and chain, used to harness two oxen together.

A yoke was a unit of land measurement used in Kent in England at the time of the Domesday Book of 1086 for tax purposes. It was equal to a quarter of a sulung. A sulung was the amount of land which could be ploughed by four ox-pairs (or approximately two hides, thus a yoke was half a hide), therefore a yoke was a pair of oxen, representing the amount of land that could be cultivated by an ox pair. A yoke also described the device used to harness two oxen together (see photo).

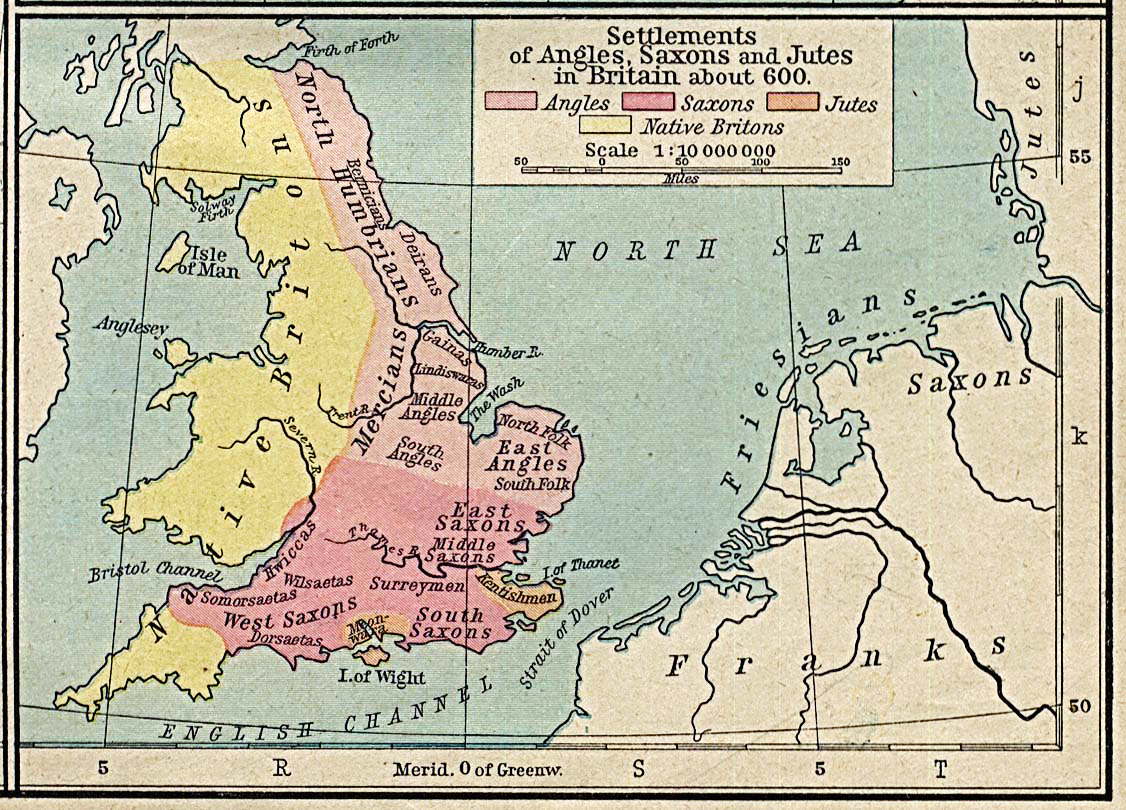
Angles, Saxons and Jutes in England circa 600 AD

In early Saxon times nearly all the Weald of Kent, the land between the chalk ridges of the North and South Downs, was covered in ancient broadleaf forest but there are indications that much of what is now Penshurst had been cultivated clearings since Roman days. The Romans left no tangible relics although we have a record of their measurement for land in the "Yokes" of Chested, Vexour, Chafford etc. The yoke is the old Roman jugerum, about 25 ares or 0.625 acres. This word has survived only in Kent. One theory is that the Jutes from Jutland conquered Kent, whereas the Angles and Saxons (c 450 AD) settled over the remainder of England. In these "yokes" along the banks of the river Medway crops such as corn would have been cultivated.

A joch is a traditional unit of area in German speaking countries, especially in Austria. One joch is the area of a square 40 klafters (about 83 yards) on a side. This comes to 0.5755 hectares or about 1.422 acres. The plural is Joche. Joch is also the word for a yoke in German, so this unit represents an area that could be ploughed in a day by a yoke of oxen. In what is now the Czech Republic this unit was known as the jitro; in Croatia it is the jutro.

There are references to the yoke or jugum in Kentish medieval records and in the Domesday survey. The rental record of Gillingham dated 1477 reveals that the yoke was a fiscal land division for purposes of rents and services, and had its own privileges. Its size was clearly related to its fertility and position. For example, an Otford rental of c.1425 lists a full yoke on the fertile soil of the valley as 120 acres, a figure to which many of these yokes approximate, but on the poor clay soils on the Downs one yoke is 231 acres.

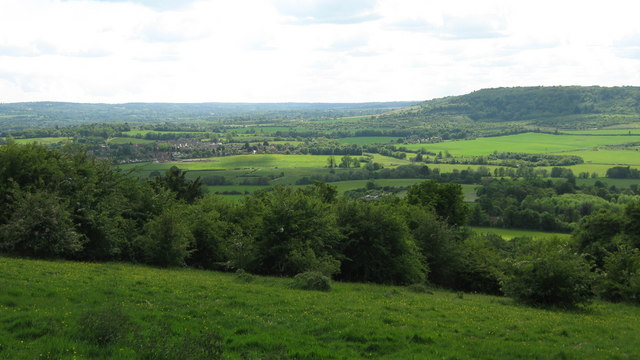
A modern view of Otford in Kent across the fields.

The stability of names of yokes was remarkable: in Otford, almost all the names recorded in 1285 survived to 1447. The fields of yokes were large enclosures, not open fields, and the land within them, although possibly cultivated co-operatively by many tenants, was usually held severally. It appears that the yoke was a compact holding and this is further suggested by early tenancies. In the 1285 Gillingham custumal, it is recorded that 73.6 percent of the tenants possessed a single yoke of land. By the 15th century gavelkind tenure gave rise to an accentuated dispersal of settlement in Kent, and many holdings were split and became uneconomic. Thus by the 15th century, yokes comprised one or more large fields farmed in many separate parcels. They were fiscal units with certain defined rights and privileges. Most of them still had a central farm, and they had at some time in the past been single land units.

== See also ==
- Imperial units
- Metrication in the United Kingdom
