= Scheitholz =

German term of specially cut wood

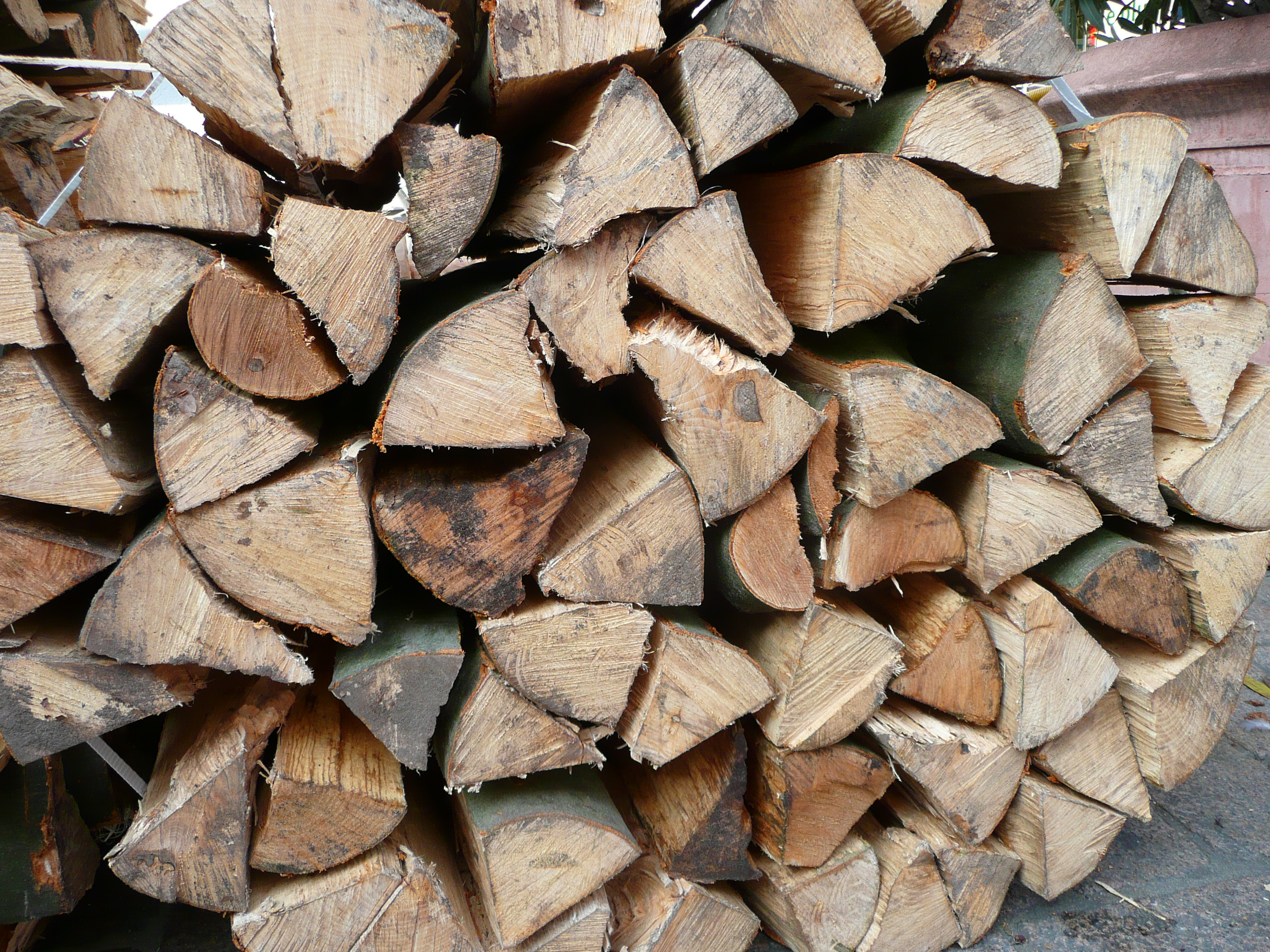
Scheitholz

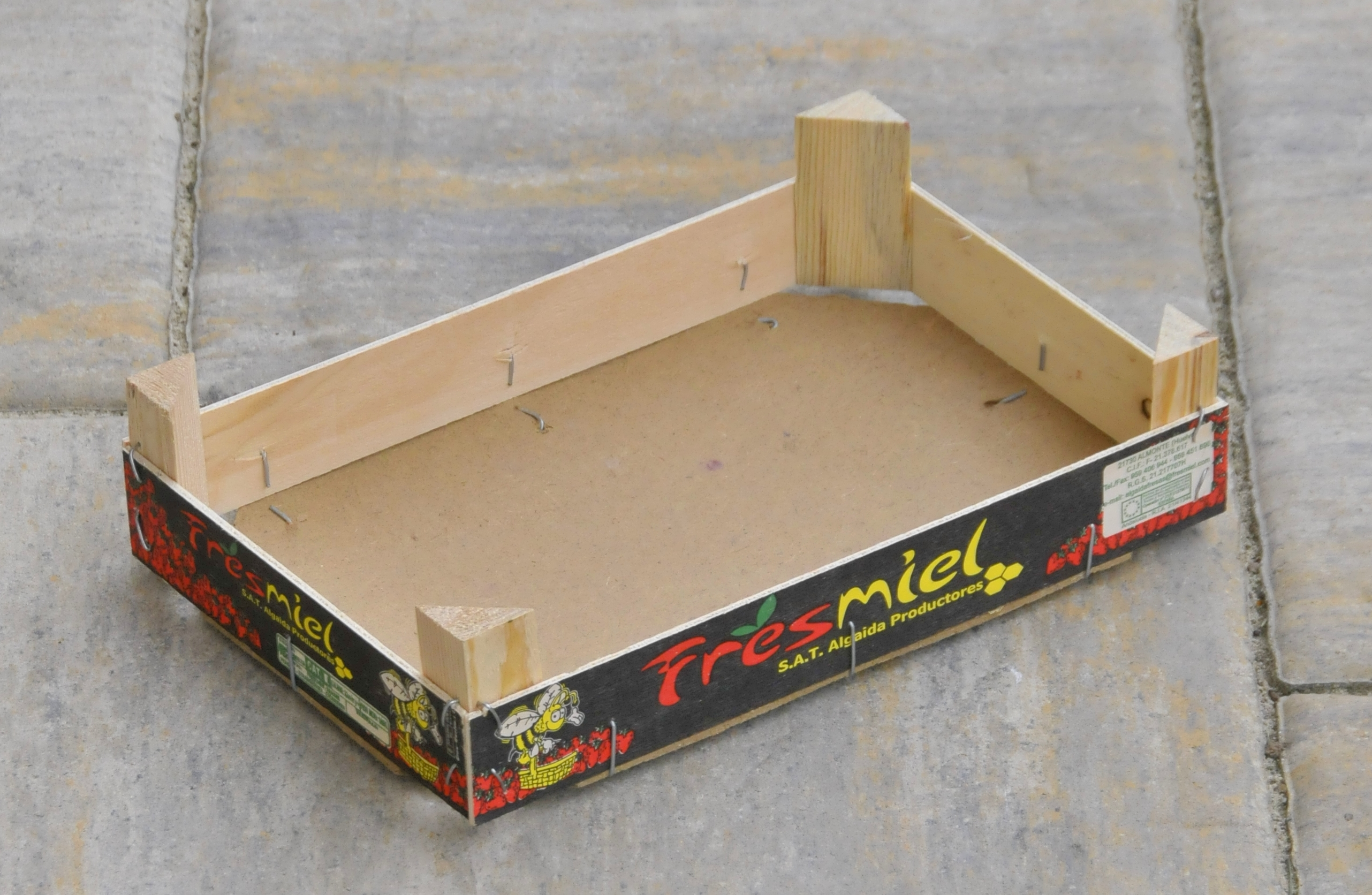
A small fruit crate made of wood and hardboard; in this case for strawberries

Scheitholz is a German term for any log sections that have been split lengthways with an axe or log splitter and that are primarily used for firewood or the manufacture of wood shingles. The individual pieces of timber are called Holzscheite (obs.: Holzscheiter), derived from the Old High German word scît = "piece". Scheitholz boilers are used to burn quantities of Scheithölzer. The expression "auf Scheitholz knien" ("to kneel on scheitholz) was a disciplinary measure used in times when corporal punishment in schools was still permitted.

Very thinly split timber is also called Spanholz or Span, roughly the same as long-fibred wood chips or wood shavings, which may also be a waste by-product of the processes of planning or hewing wood. Span may also refer, however, to long-fibred slips or slices of wood especially of poplar and other softwoods, which are used to make wooden punnets and fruit or vegetable crates.

== See also ==
- Klafter, an old unit of length or volume for Scheitholz
- Fidibus, a firelighter
- Spanbaum
