= Obsolete Austrian units of measurement =

Austrian units of measurement were used in Austria until the adoption of the metric system.

== History ==
In 1756, the ruling Archduchess of Austria, Maria Theresa, ordered that the Viennese klafter as well as its multiples and fractions, should be the state-defined measure of length in the Archduchy of Austria and the Kingdom of Hungary. The Viennese cubit, that is 1 3/4 of the Roman cubit (cubitus or elbow), was also used as a measure of length.

The law should also have applied to the Lands of the Bohemian Crown, of which Maria Theresa was queen. However, the traditional Roman foot remained in common use in Prague.

When the metric system was introduced by law on 23 July 1871 (which became obligatory on 1 January 1876), the length of the klafter (kl) was established as exactly 1.89648384 metres.

== Measures ==
Austrian units of measurement
Name of unit	Length	Other equivalents	Relation to SI units
Point (Punkt)			182.917 037 μm
Line (Linie)	12 points		2.195 004 mm
Inch (Zoll)	144 points	12 lines	26.340 053 mm
Fist (Faust)	576 points	48 lines = 4 inches = 1/3 foot	105.360 213 mm
Span (Spanne)	2 fists	2/3 of a foot	210.72 mm
Foot (Fuß)	1,728 points	144 lines = 12 inches	316.080 640 mm
Klafter	6 ft		1.896 483 840 m (Viennese klafter)
Rod (Rute)	10 ft		3.160 806 400 m
Mile (Meile)	24,000 ft	4,000 klafters = 2,400 rods	7.585 935 360 km

Austrian post-mile, police-mile, geographic mile = 3,910 Viennese klafters.
