= Cieszyn West County =

Short lived-county of Poland in 1938

- County of Silesian Voivodeship
- 1938–1938
- Cieszyn West County within Silesian Voivodeship.
- Capital: Český Těšín
- Area
  - Coordinates: 49°44′46″N 18°37′34″E
- Government
  - Type: County
- History
  - Incorporation of Trans-Olza into Poland: 2 October 1938
  - Incorporation into Cieszyn County: 27 October 1938
- Contained within
  - Country: Poland
  - Voivodeship: Silesian
Preceded by	Succeeded by
Český Těšín District	Cieszyn County

Cieszyn West County (Polish pronunciation: [ˈt͡ɕɛ.ʂɘ̟n]; Polish: powiat cieszyński zachodni) was a short-lived county of Silesian Voivodeship within the Poland in 1938. It was established following the incorporation of the region of Trans-Olza by Poland from Czechoslovakia on 2 October 1938. The subdivision was formed from Český Těšín District. On 27 October 1938, it was incorporated into the Cieszyn County. Its seat was located in the town of Český Těšín (then known in Polish as Cieszyn Zachodni).

== History ==
Following the Munich Agreement signed on 30 September 1938, Germany incorporated the German-speaking area of Sudetenland from Czechoslovakia. In context those such events, on 30 September 1938, Poland demanded Czechoslovakia to cede to it the Polish-speaking area of Trans-Olza, which it did on 2 October 1938. It was formed from Český Těšín District, which was subsequently renamed to Cieszyn West County, with its seat being placed in the town of Český Těšín (then renamed to the Polish name Cieszyn Zachodni, lit. 'West Cieszyn'). It existed until 27 October 1938, when it was incorporated into Cieszyn County. As such, provisional local governments were set up in the area, until proper government officials could have been elected. The area of former Cieszyn West County was never fully incorporated administratively into Cieszyn County, and all documentation continued to list incorporated area separately, listing it as the "western part of Cieszyn County".
