= Karol Daniel Kadłubiec =

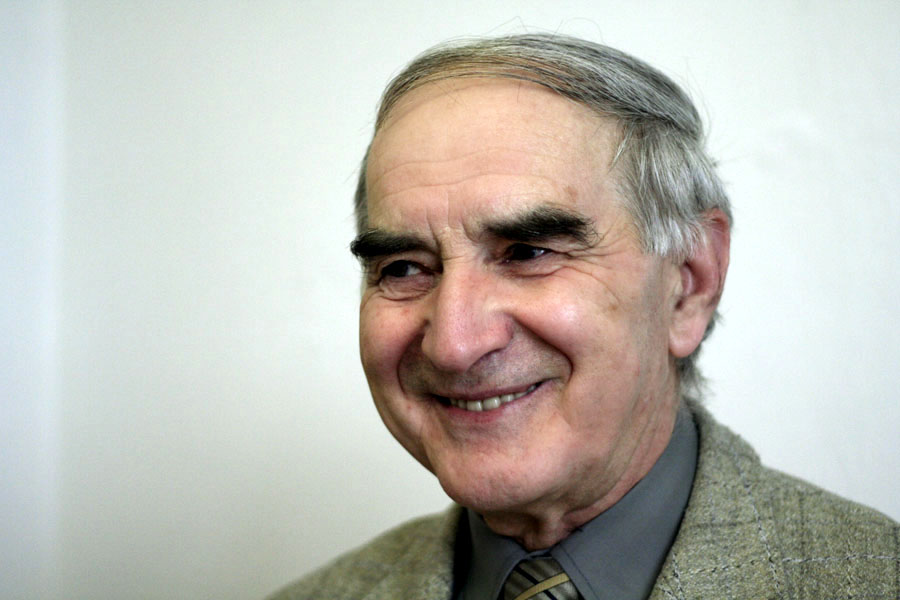
- Karol Daniel Kadłubiec
- Born: July 22, 1937 (age 87); Karpentná, Czechoslovakia
- Citizenship: Czechoslovak, Czech
- Occupation(s): Ethnographer, folklorist, historian

Karol Daniel Kadłubiec (born 22 July 1937) is a Polish Czech ethnographer, folklorist and historian. He specializes also in ethnology, history of language and dialectology, and in a studies of culture, folklore and language of Cieszyn Silesia and Trans-Olza.

== Biography ==
Kadłubiec graduated from Polish primary school in Bystřice, Polish gymnasium in Český Těšín in 1955 and then from Slavic philology at the Charles University in Prague in 1960. He earned a professor degree in 1994.

He works at a Pedagogical Institute at the University of Ostrava from 1964 and later worked at the Charles University in Prague as a head of department of Polish studies and folkloristic. Kadłubiec is a head of Institute for Studies of Polish Ethnic in the Czech Republic at the University of Ostrava from 1990. He was a co-founder of ethnology department at the University of Silesia in Cieszyn and co-founder and head of Folkloristic Section of General Committee of PZKO.

Kadłubiec is also active member of PZKO (Polish Educational and Cultural Union) and from 1965 is a chairman of MK PZKO Mistrzowice.

He is author of several books and of about 600 scientific discourses and articles and long-time contributor to Zwrot magazine.

== Works ==
- Płyniesz Olzo ... Vol. 1–2 (1970–1972) (editor)
- Gawędziarz cieszyński (1973) (with Józef Jeżowicz)
- Na cieszyńskiej ziemi: jednodniówka z okazji dwudziestolecia Sekcji Folklorystycznej przy Zarządzie Głównym Polskiego Związku Kulturalno-Oświatowego (1985) (editor)
- Uwarunkowania cieszyńskiej kultury ludowej (1987)
- Ojcowski dom: jednodniówka na dwudziestopięciolecie Sekcji Folklorystycznej Zarządu Głównego Polskiego Związku Kulturalno-Oświatowego (1990) (editor)
- Raz, dwa, trzy, wychodź ty!: twórczość słowna polskich dzieci z Zaolzia (1993) (with Ilona Fryda)
- Cieszyńsko-zaolziańska polszczyzna (1994)
- Górniczy śmiech: komizm ludowy pogranicza czesko-polskiego (1995)
- Kultura ludowa na pograniczu (1995) (editor)
- Nasza ojcowizna : jednodniówka na trzydziestolecie Sekcji Folklorystycznej przy Zarządzie Głównym Polskiego Związku Kulturalno-Oświatowego (1995) (editor, with Jan Szymik)
- Polská národní menšina na Těšínsku v České republice (1920–1995) (1997)
- Cieszyńska ojczyzna polszczyzna (2001) (with Władysław Milerski)
- Skoro zapómniane: o radościach i smutkach starej Karwiny (2002)
- W cieszyńskim mateczniku (2015)
- Płyniesz Olzo: monografia kultury ludowej Śląska Cieszyńskiego (2016)
- Opowiado Anna Chybidziurowa (2017)
- Od Cieszyna do Bogumina (2019)
