= Koniaków =

- Village
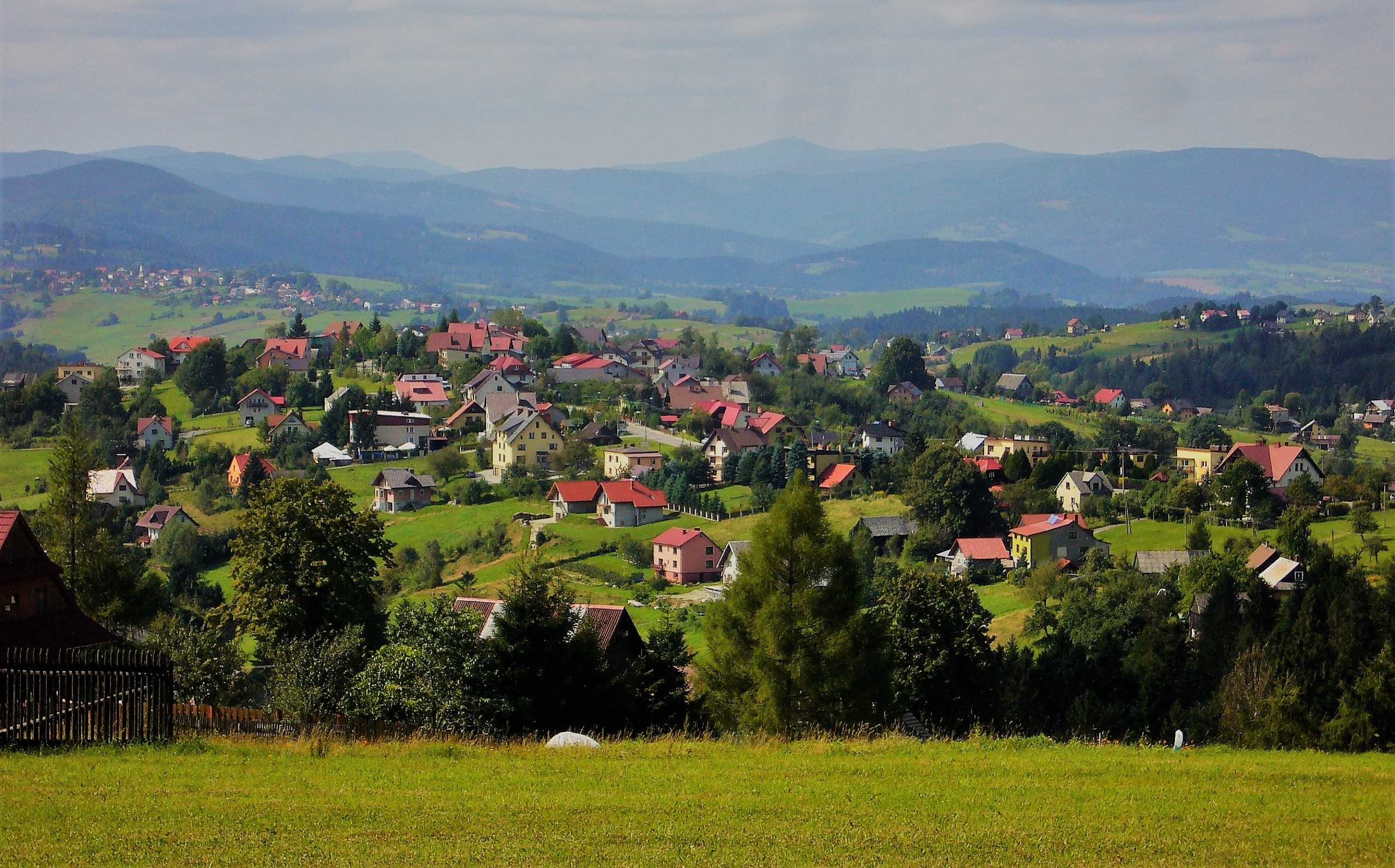
- View of Koniaków

- Location within Poland
- Coordinates: 49°33′6.15″N 18°56′26.94″E
- Country: Poland
- Voivodeship: Silesian
- County: Cieszyn
- Gmina: Istebna
- Established: 1712

Government
  - Mayor: Jan Gazur

Area
  - Total: 14.69 km^{2} (5.67 sq mi)
- Elevation: 700 m (2,300 ft)

Population (2012)
  - Total: 3,643
  - Density: 248.0/km^{2} (642.3/sq mi)
- Time zone: UTC+1 (CET)
  - Summer (DST): UTC+2 (CEST)
- Postal code: 43-474
- Car plates: SCI

Koniaków (Silesian: Kōniakow) is a village in the Beskid Śląski mountain range in Cieszyn County, Silesian Voivodeship, southern Poland. It is the highest village by elevation in the Silesian Beskids and lies in the historical region of Cieszyn Silesia. The village is primarily known for its tradition of intricate lace-making.

The name is possessive in origin, derived from personal name Koniak. It is thought that the name was conveyed by settlers from Koňákov (Koniaków) who supposedly established (or took part in the process of establishing of) the village.

== History ==
The settlement on the territory of the village began in the first half of the 17th century. It was settled by inhabitants of Istebna looking for new pastures and meadows, and clearing trees in the local forests to create land for grazing. This was deemed illegal by the owners of the Duchy of Teschen, as the forest was a part of defensive system of the duchy in the times of Thirty Years War. Later chalupy na Koniakowie (cottages in Koniaków) were being mentioned in the documents in the years 1695-1712. The year 1712 is nowadays accepted as the one the village was established, however it became independent from Istebna in 1816. The first inhabitants (from Koniaków?) were mainly cattle herders.

After the 1848 Revolutions in the Austrian Empire, a modern municipal division was introduced in the re-established Austrian Silesia. The village as a municipality was part of the political district of Cieszyn and the legal district of Jablunkov. According to censuses conducted in 1880, 1890, 1900 and 1910, the population of the municipality grew from 857 in 1880 to 1,120 in 1910, with all the inhabitants being native Polish speakers. In terms of religion, in 1910 the majority were Roman Catholics (88.7%), followed by Protestants (11.3%). The village was also traditionally inhabited by Silesian Gorals, speaking the Jablunkov dialect.

After World War I, the fall of Austria-Hungary, the Polish–Czechoslovak War and the division of Cieszyn Silesia in 1920, it became a part of Poland and was transferred to Cieszyn County. It was then annexed by Nazi Germany at the beginning of World War II. After the war, it was restored to Poland.

== Koniaków lace ==
The tradition of lace-making in Koniaków is more than 150 years old. Koniaków laces are handmade by crocheting cotton thread, using motifs inspired by nature. Lace motifs are worked separately, then connected to form larger pieces. The lace additions began appearing in pillows, shirts, blouses, and tablecloths around 1900.

Real fame was brought to Koniaków by lace tablecloths and table runners, which reached the tables of kings, aristocrats, and bishops. One was prepared for Queen Elizabeth II and another for Pope John Paul II. There are many examples of Koniaków lace lying on altars in Poland and other countries.

Lace-making became subject to anger and disapproval in 2003, dividing the small Koniaków society, when some young lace makers started to make underwear out of Koniaków lace. Some elders in Koniaków view this activity as a disgrace upon an ancient and respectful profession; however, the new twist on Koniaków lace was a big success.

Koniaków lingerie is a byproduct of the lace-making tradition in the village. Although traditional lace has always been a village staple for industry, it wasn't until lace makers turned their crochet hooks to crafting G-strings, thongs and other lingerie items that the village had its products become more and more popular.

Understanding that the Polish political system went through upheaval after the fall of communism in 1989, the $1,000 tablecloths became much harder to sell. Although considered heirlooms and taking more than a week to craft, tablecloths and doilies weren't bringing in enough money for the village lace makers, which affected all aspects of life.
