= Finidr =

Company in the Czech Republic

FINIDR s.r.o.
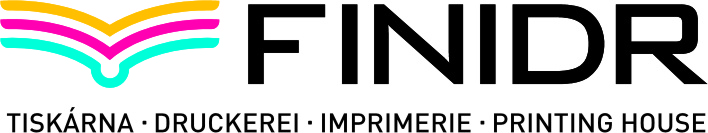
- Type: Limited company
- Industry: Polygraphy
- Headquarters: Český Těšín, Czech Republic
- Area served: Worldwide
- Services: books, brochures, catalogues, color print, black-and-white print, binding, specialties, refinement
- Revenue: €38 million
- Owner: Jaroslav Drahoš
- Number of employees: 480 (2019)
- Website: https://www.finidr.com/

FINIDR s.r.o. is an offset and web-fed offset printing house. FINIDR specializes on book-making and other printing production. FINIDR exports over 70% of its production to Western European markets, such as Germany, France, Austria, Great Britain, Belgium, Netherlands, and Scandinavia etc.

== History ==
History of the FINIDR printing house begins in 1994. The printing house was founded in Český Těšín where polygraphy has a tradition of more than 200 years. Printing house was founded by three shareholders and its name is derived from their surnames. Since 2009 the printing house FINIDR has had the sole shareholder, Ing. Jaroslav Drahoš. The printing house was established on a green field and from the beginning it focused on printing book publications. After the first year of its activity, the printing house employed 22 employees. Today 480 employees work here.

In 1998 FINIDR bought a part of industrial complex and moved all production processes under one roof. Another milestone was the year of 2000, when FINIDR procured first printing machine, Heidelberg in B1 format.

In 2001 company adopted new information system, INFOR ERP Syte Line, which enables employees to react immediately on customers’ requirements.

In 2006 a new, modern hall was built, of which style referred to the existing complex. After its completion, the printing house had more than 12 000 m^{2} of the production and storage premises. In 2019 there was another extension of the premises - a new hall D was erected. The hall size was extended in total to 1 630 m^{2}. In 2020 the extension of the hall D was initiated. The hall was completed in June 2021 with a production area of 2500m². It will provide additional production space for bookbinding stands.

Since 2007 the printing house has had all important production technologies duplicated and constantly situated in just one building.

In 2011 FINIDR implemented new Code of Conduct for all its employees.

In 2012 extensive investments into modern technologies were implemented and new internal training center, FINIDR Academy, was established.

There have been constantly new investments in new printing machines and technologies which enable to improve the quality and final effect of the products. In 2019 a new Uniplex line was purchased which consists of the Aster Pro sewing machine and a collating line with twelve stations. A new cutter machine - Polar Pace 137 - was also acquired, as well as a creasing and folding machine for envelopes with flaps. Last year the printing house also made some new investments and bought two most modern Heidelberg printing machines. Heidelberg Speedmaster XL 106-8-P latest generation 2020 with 8 color towers was installed as the first one in the Central and Eastern Europe. Overall, it became the third machine of this size in FINIDR. The second printing machine was Heidelberg Speedmaster XL 75–5. This machine was the first of its kind in Europe. Other machines installed in the period from April to June 2020 include a CTP machine, a fully automated folding machine, a sewing machine and a collating line. All significant projects implemented in 2020 were CO_{2} free. It means that these new machines installed in 2020 were produced in an environmentally friendly manner and the carbon footprint (CO_{2}) generated during their production was fully compensated within the framework of the FINIDR's ongoing environmental projects.

At the beginning of 2021, the owner of the nearby Těšínská tiskárna decided to close down the printing business and shut down production. This printing house (with different names) had a long tradition of 215 years. Therefore, the representatives of FINIDR were approached to see if they could find a way to at least partially preserve this tradition. After long negotiations, it was finally possible to agree on the purchase of certain printing machines, the transfer of some employees and finally the purchase of the printing plant property. In the course of May and June 2021, book production will gradually start again in this building - this time under the auspices of FINIDR.

In 2020, the FINIDR printing house achieved annual turnover of 35 million euros and produced 22 million books. In the previous year (2019), its turnover achieved the amount of 38 million euros and 24 million books were produced. In the second quarter of 2020, the milestone, 350th millionth book was produced in the FINIDR printing house. These figures prove the fact that the FINIDR printing house is one of the leaders on the Czech and European market.

== Certificates ==
In 2008 the printing house joined the certificating system FSC. The Forest Stewardship Council® is the international non-governmental organization that was established in 1993 in order to support the forest management and create a certification system as a tool for tracing the origin of timber from loggings, through processing to the final product - e.g. paper and products made of it. The FINIDR printing house is the largest producer of FSC® books in the Czech Republic.

In 2015, the printing house received the CrefoCert certificate for the first time. Since this year, it has been its annual holder. In 2017 the certificate changed its name to CrefoPort.

In 2016 the FINIDR printing house was given the certificate “Carbon footprint management’ which allows it to produce CO_{2} neutral products. These are products with zero carbon footprint.

The company is also the holder of the Fogra PSO offset print certificate, a certificate for green companies and companies that use green energy. The printing house FINIDR, s.r.o. is involved in a carbon footprint management plan with the aim of reducing its environmental impact and CO_{2} emissions over a specified period.

In 2020 the FINIDR printing house was successfully audited in the field of corporate social responsibility (CSR), carried out by an international auditing company EcoVadis. For second time FINIDR received silver medal.

== Social responsibilities and sponsorship ==
For the whole period of 2021 the printing house commitment to plant one tree for every accepted order. In this way it wants to help to restore and compose forests in Europe and plant trees that are missing - as firs, beeches and maples. Since 2010, the FINIDR printing house has been the main partner for material gifts in the national campaign The whole Czechia reads to children which promotes reading and spending time together with parents. Each year the FINIDR printing house supports also several activities in the area of preschool activities for children and teenagers in Český Těšín and its surroundings.

The company has also organized excursions for the Charity center for seniors in Český Těšín.

It also cooperates with the company Člověk v tísni on the project "Let's Build a School in Africa".

Regular support is also provided in a form of delivering paper to nursery schools, schools and NGOs in Český Těšín and its close surroundings.

In 2008, the FINIDR company contributed to the establishment of a printing faculty within its cooperation with the Albrecht's High School in Český Těšín. Students who study at this faculty can practice in a studio of graphics, CTP center, printing, book-binding and manual work department. In 2017 a new faculty was created - printing on polygraphy machines. FINIDR's key employees teach at the school and students carry out their mandatory internship in FINIDR's graphic studio, CTP, bindery etc.

== Fairs ==
FINIDR traditionally presents its printing and binding crafts on fairs such as Svět knihy Praha, Frankfurter Buchmesse, Leipziger Buchmesse, The London Book Fair and IPG Conference London.

== Awards ==
- 2021 - Magnesia litera - The readers’ award for Já, Finis
- 2020 - The Book of the Year - Šikmý kostel
- 2020 - Magnesia litera - A jako Antarktida, Jan Ámos Komenský: Labyrint světa a ráj srdce, a Jan Žižka

The readers’ award for GUMP: Pes, který naučil lidi žít.

- 2019 - The most beautiful books of the Czech Republic - 3rd place for excellent polygraphic design of the book by Jan Ámos Komenský: Labyrint světa a ráj srdce
- 2019 - The most beautiful books of Slovakia - Božská komédia, Vtáčí atlas, Toto nie je kuchárska kniha, Karol Kállay – Zaostrené na krásu.

The main award of the Slovak Ministry of Culture for the overall artistic and technical quality of Dante Alighieri's book: Božská komédia

- 2018 -The most beautiful book of Austria - My father never cut his hair, Zahlen, bitte
- 2018 - The most beautiful books of Slovakia - J. Satinský: Gundžovníky, J. W. Goethe: Faust
- 2018 - The most beautiful books of Germany - Die grüne Stadtküche
- 2017 - The most beautiful book of the Czech Republic - the award of SČUG Hollar for unique illustrations was given to the edition Jedna Báseň, volume 1 – Koleno, volume 2 – Maryčka Magdonova
- 2017 - The most beautiful books of Slovakia - Martin Štrba – Pevná zem pod hlavou, Lily a Momo
