= Karpentná =

Karpentná Polish: Karpętna, German: Karpentna
- Village (administrative part of Třinec)
- Interactive map of Karpentná
- Coordinates: 49°38′7.8″N 18°41′15″E
- Country: Czech Republic
- Region: Moravian-Silesian
- District: Frýdek-Místek
- Municipality: Třinec
- First mentioned: 1552
- Elevation: 345 m (1,132 ft)

Population (1 January 2008)
  - Total: 705
- Postal code: 739 94

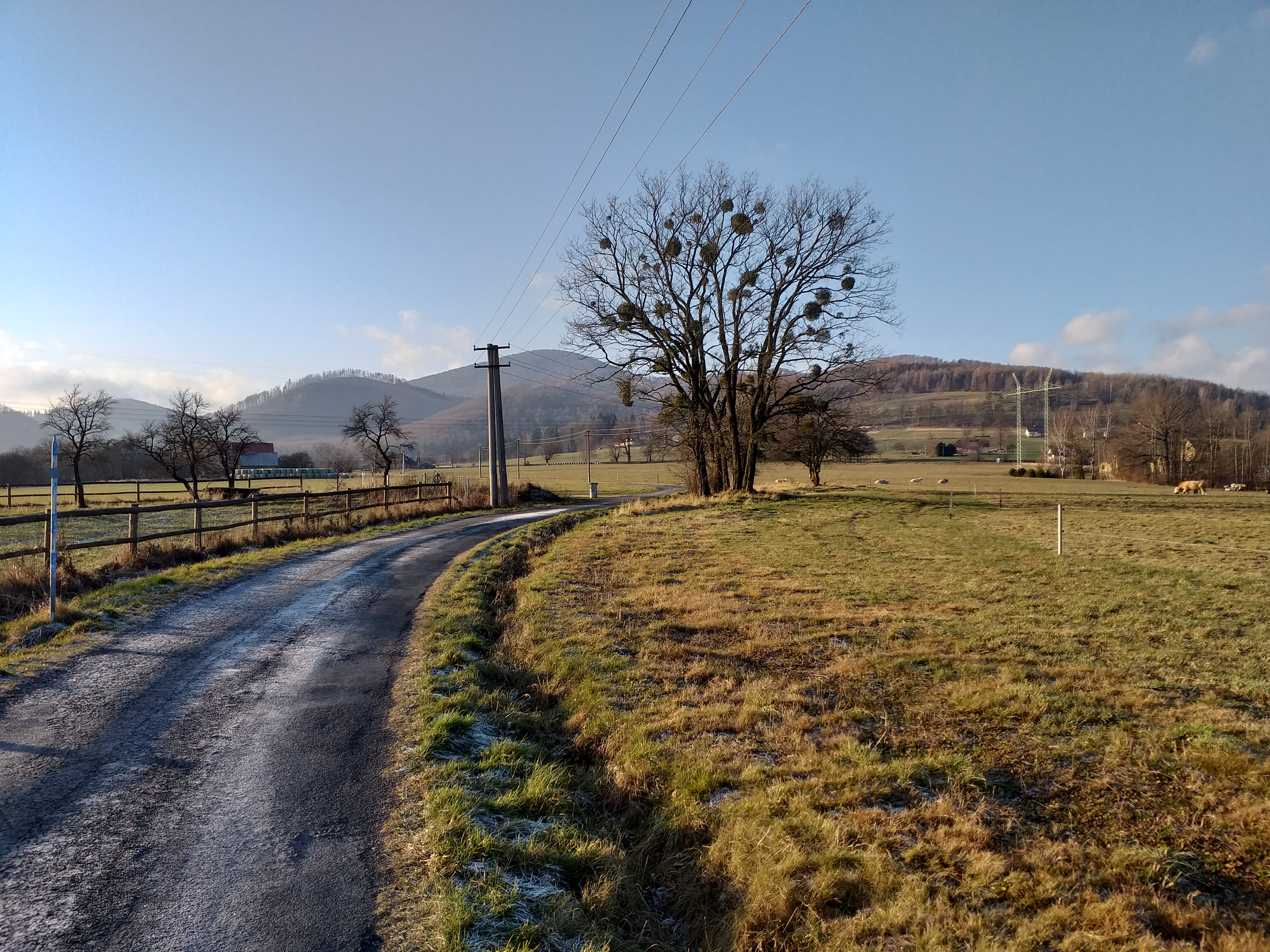
Landscape in Karpentná

Karpentná (Polish: Karpętna) is a village in Frýdek-Místek District, Moravian-Silesian Region, Czech Republic. It was a separate municipality but became administratively a part of Třinec in 1980. It lies in the historical region of Cieszyn Silesia and has a population of 705 (1 January 2008).

The name is of topographic origins derived from Old Polish verb karpić się or noun karpaty denoting a ground that is lumpy, scabrous, in southern Poland adjective karpętny describes uneven, bumpy road.

Popular folk song in the regional dialect Na Karpyntnej zdechnył kóń (A Horse Died in Karpętna) refers to the village.

== History ==
The village was first mentioned in 1552. It belonged then to the Duchy of Teschen, a fee of the Kingdom of Bohemia and a part of the Habsburg monarchy.

After Revolutions of 1848 in the Austrian Empire a modern municipal division was introduced in the re-established Austrian Silesia. The village as a municipality was subscribed to the political district of Cieszyn and the legal district of Jablunkov. According to the censuses conducted in 1880, 1890, 1900 and 1910 the population of the municipality grew from 468 in 1880 to 521 in 1910 with all the inhabitants being native Polish-speakers. In terms of religion in 1910 the majority were Protestants (98.1%), followed by Roman Catholics (10 or 1.9%). The village was also traditionally inhabited by Cieszyn Vlachs, speaking Cieszyn Silesian dialect.

After World War I, fall of Austria-Hungary, Polish–Czechoslovak War and the division of Cieszyn Silesia in 1920, it became a part of Czechoslovakia. Following the Munich Agreement, in October 1938 together with the Zaolzie region it was annexed by Poland, administratively adjoined to Cieszyn County of Silesian Voivodeship. It was then annexed by Nazi Germany at the beginning of World War II. After the war it was restored to Czechoslovakia.

== People ==
- Stanisław Hadyna, founder of Śląsk Song and Dance Ensemble
- Karol Daniel Kadłubiec, Polish ethnographer, folklorist and historian

== See also ==
- Polish minority in the Czech Republic
- Zaolzie
