= Stanislavice =

Village in Karviná District of Moravian Silesian region

Coordinates: 49°45′43″N 18°32′47″E

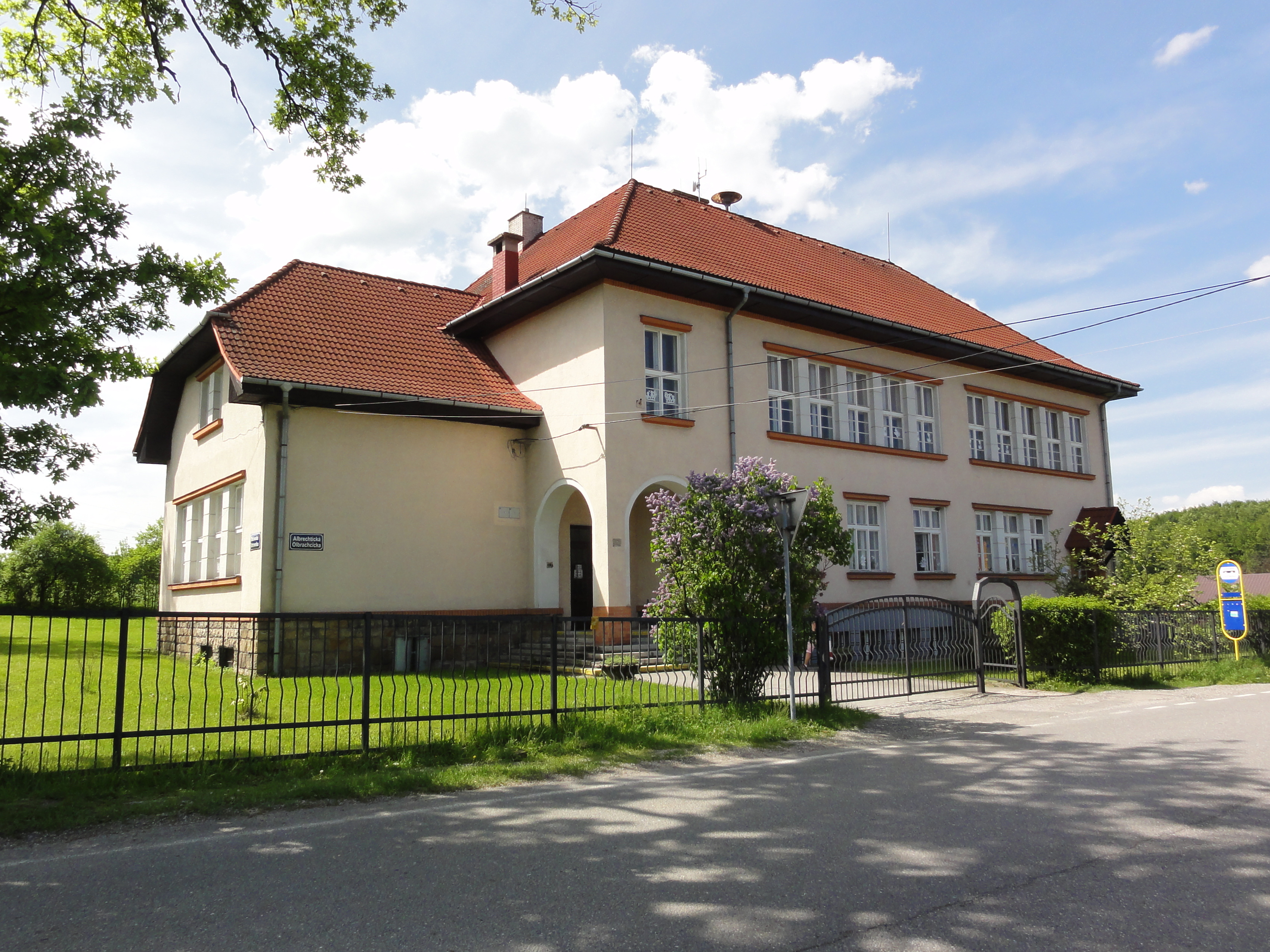
Elementary school in the village

Stanislavice (Polish: Stanisłowice, German: Stanislowitz, Stänzelsdorf) is a village in Karviná District, Moravian-Silesian Region, Czech Republic. It was a separate municipality but became administratively a part of Český Těšín in 1975. It has a population of 545 (2005).

The name is patronymic in origin derived from personal name Stanislaus.

== History ==
The village was first mentioned in 1438 as Stanislawicz[e]. Politically the village belonged then to the Duchy of Teschen, a fee of the Kingdom of Bohemia, which after 1526 became part of the Habsburg monarchy.

After Revolutions of 1848 in the Austrian Empire a modern municipal division was introduced in the re-established Austrian Silesia. The village as a municipality was subscribed to the political and legal district of Cieszyn. According to the censuses conducted in 1880, 1890, 1900 and 1910 the population of the municipality dropped from 467 in 1880 to 420 in 1910 with a majority being native Polish-speakers (between 97.9% and 99.3%) accompanied by a few German-speaking (at most 5 or 1.3% in 1900) and Czech-speaking people (at most 3 or 0.8% in 1900). In terms of religion in 1910 the majority were Roman Catholics (66.2%), followed by Protestants (32.9%) and Jews (4 people). The village was also traditionally inhabited by Cieszyn Vlachs, speaking Cieszyn Silesian dialect.

After World War I, fall of Austria-Hungary, Polish–Czechoslovak War and the division of Cieszyn Silesia in 1920, it became a part of Czechoslovakia. Following the Munich Agreement, in October 1938 together with the Zaolzie region it was annexed by Poland, administratively adjoined to Cieszyn County of Silesian Voivodeship. It was then annexed by Nazi Germany at the beginning of World War II. After the war it was restored to Czechoslovakia.

== See also ==
- Polish minority in the Czech Republic
- Zaolzie
