= Český Těšín District =

Former district of Czechoslovakia

Coordinates: 49°44′33″N 18°37′00″E

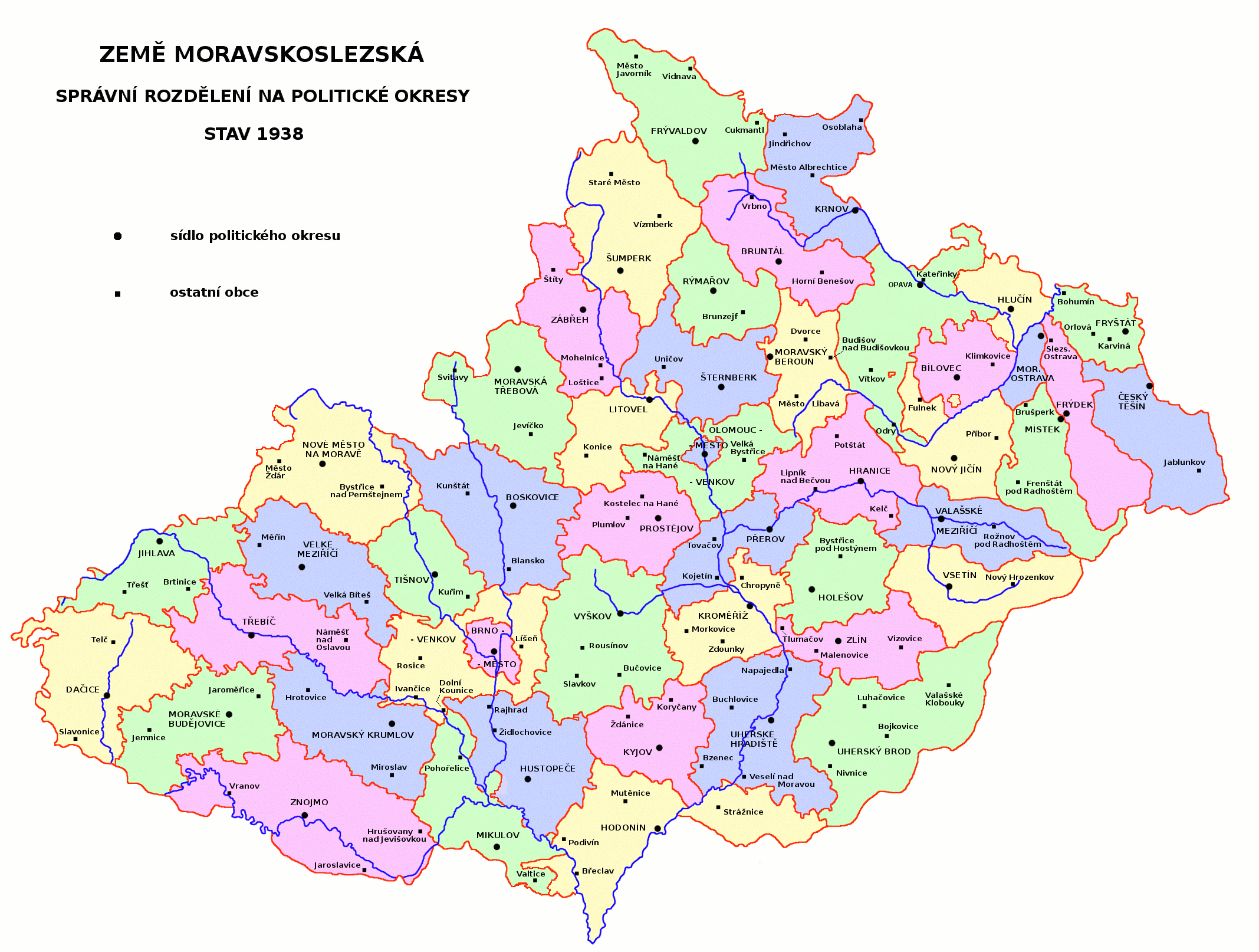
Districts in Moravia and Czech Silesia as of 1938, Český Těšín District in the north-east corner

Český Těšín District (Czech: okres Český Těšín, Polish: powiat Czeski Cieszyn) was a district (okres) of Czechoslovakia existing between 1920–1938 and 1945–1960. Its administrative centre was the town of Český Těšín.

The district was formed after the division of Cieszyn Silesia on 28 July 1920, which split the town of Teschen/Cieszyn/Těšín into Cieszyn and Český Těšín as well as the preceding Teschen County originally formed in 1850 on the territory of Austrian Silesia. Following the Munich Agreement, in November 1938 together with the Trans-Olza region it was annexed by Poland. The Český Těšín District was administratively transformed to a short-lived Cieszyn Zachodni County and afterwards it was merged with Cieszyn County of Silesian Voivodeship. The area was then annexed by Nazi Germany at the beginning of World War II. After the war it was restored to Czechoslovakia. Český Těšín District ceased to exist as a result of a reform act issued on 9 April 1960 and was succeeded mostly by the Frýdek-Místek District, with some municipalities including Český Těšín transferred to the Karviná District.

The territory of the district was in large part inhabited by the Polish minority. Český Těšín District covered the exact southern part of Trans-Olza area and Poles were proportionately more numerous there than in the newly gerrymandered Frýdek-Místek District, which also encompasses the ethnically pure Czech areas west of Trans-Olza.
