= Mosty (Český Těšín) =

Coordinates: 49°45′0″N 18°35′22″E

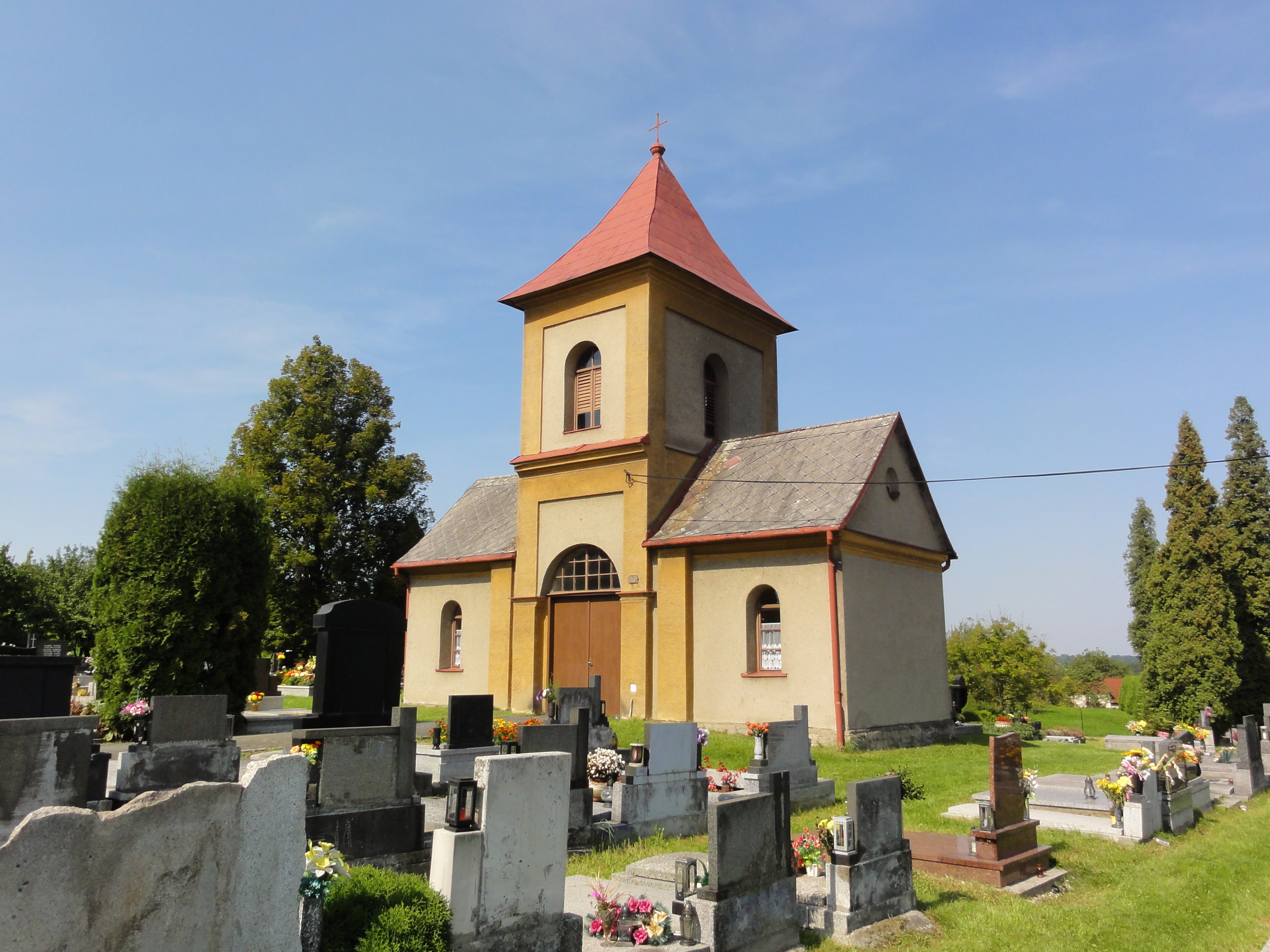
Cemetery chapel in Mosty

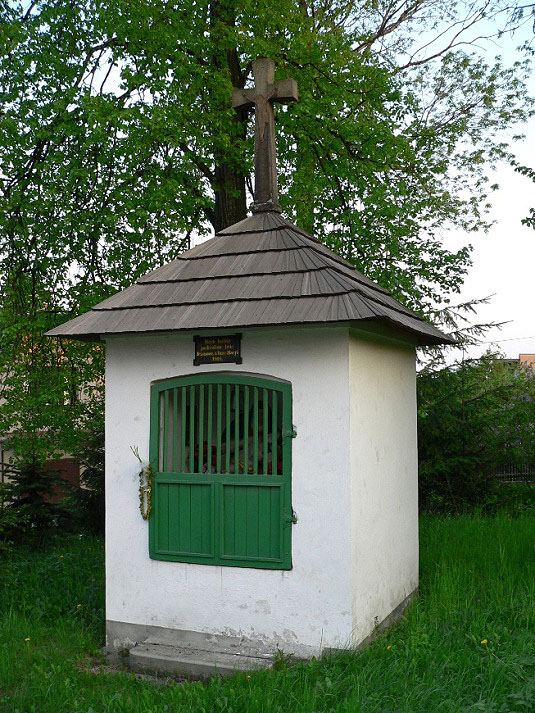
Swedish chapel from the mid-17th century

Mosty (literally "bridges") (Polish: Mosty koło Cieszyna, German: Mosty bei Teschen) is a village and part of Český Těšín in Karviná District in the Moravian-Silesian Region of the Czech Republic. It was a separate municipality but became administratively a part of Mistřovice in 1960 and later Český Těšín in 1975. As of 2021, it has a population of 1,253.

== History ==
The village was first mentioned in 1495 as Mosty. Politically the village belonged then to the Duchy of Teschen, a fee of the Kingdom of Bohemia, which after 1526 became part of the Habsburg monarchy.

During the Thirty Years' War on 21 April 1647, a battle between Swedish (led by Arvid Wittenberg) and Habsburg armies took place here. Swedish army was defeated and retreated from the region afterwards. On the spot of Swedish mass grave a chapel was erected.

After Revolutions of 1848 in the Austrian Empire a modern municipal division was introduced in the re-established Austrian Silesia. The village as a municipality was subscribed to the political and legal district of Cieszyn. According to the censuses conducted in 1880–1910 the population of the municipality grew from 811 in 1880 to 1,209 in 1910 with a majority being native Polish-speakers (between 91.9% and 98%) accompanied by a German-speaking minority (at most 64 or 8% in 1880) and Czech-speaking people (at most 14 or 1.2% in 1910). In terms of religion in 1910 the majority were Roman Catholics (53.4%), followed by Protestants (46.1%) and Jews (5 people).

After World War I, Polish–Czechoslovak War and the division of Cieszyn Silesia in 1920, it became a part of Czechoslovakia. Following the Munich Agreement, in October 1938 together with the Zaolzie region it was annexed by Poland, administratively adjoined to Cieszyn County of Silesian Voivodeship. It was then annexed by Nazi Germany at the beginning of World War II. After the war it was restored to Czechoslovakia.

== See also ==
- Polish minority in the Czech Republic
- Zaolzie
