= Koňákov =

Czech village

Coordinates: 49°44′13″N 18°33′14″E

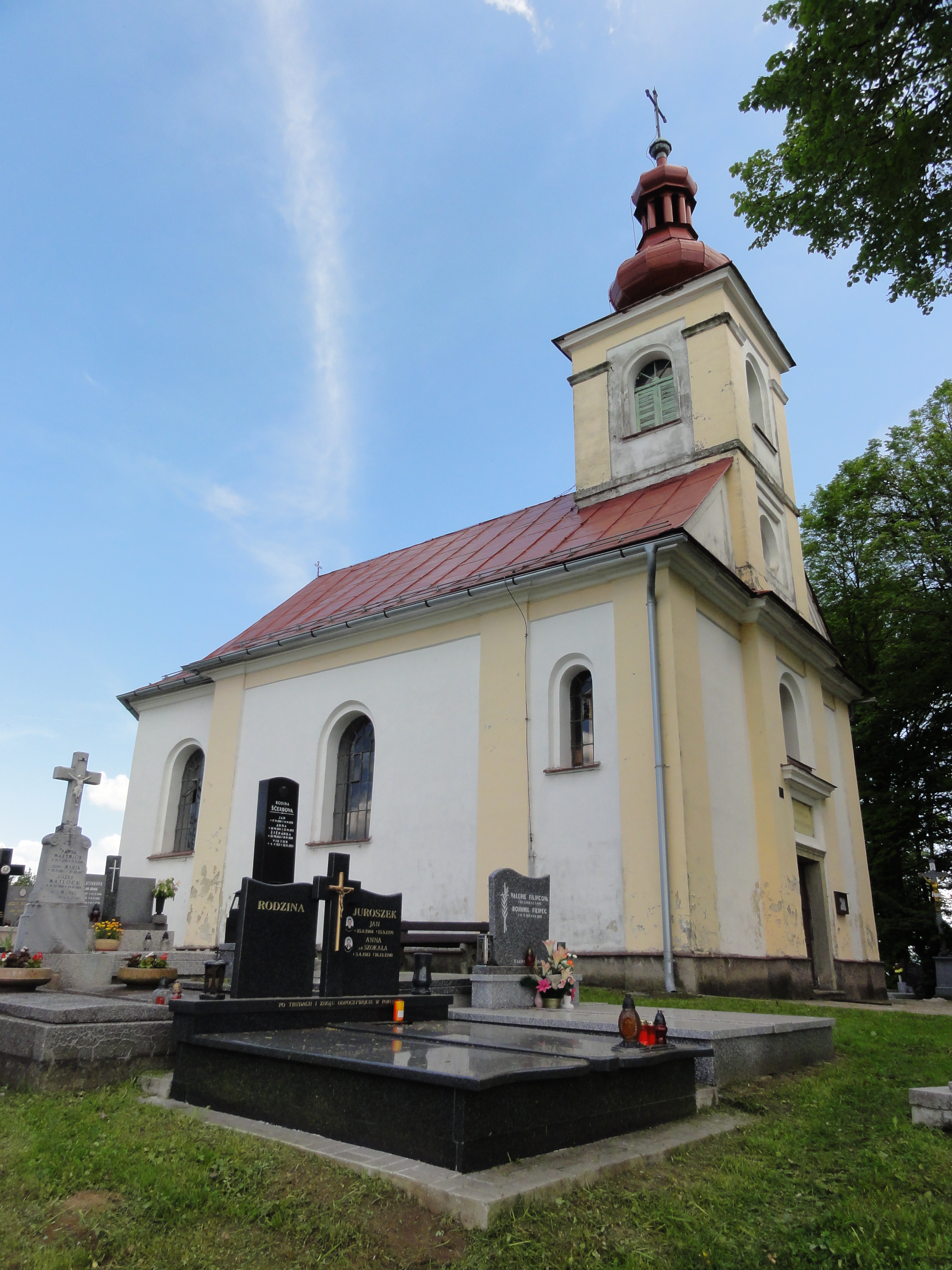
A Catholic church from 1863

Koňákov (Polish: Koniaków, German: Konakau) is a village in Karviná District, Moravian-Silesian Region, Czech Republic. It was first mentioned in 1478 and in 1850 was a separate municipality, later it was a part of Mistřovice municipality which became administratively a part of Český Těšín in 1975. In 2001 it had a population of 228.

In the village there is a Lutheran chapel and a Catholic church built in 1863.
