= Český Těšín =

Český Těšín Czeski Cieszyn
- Town
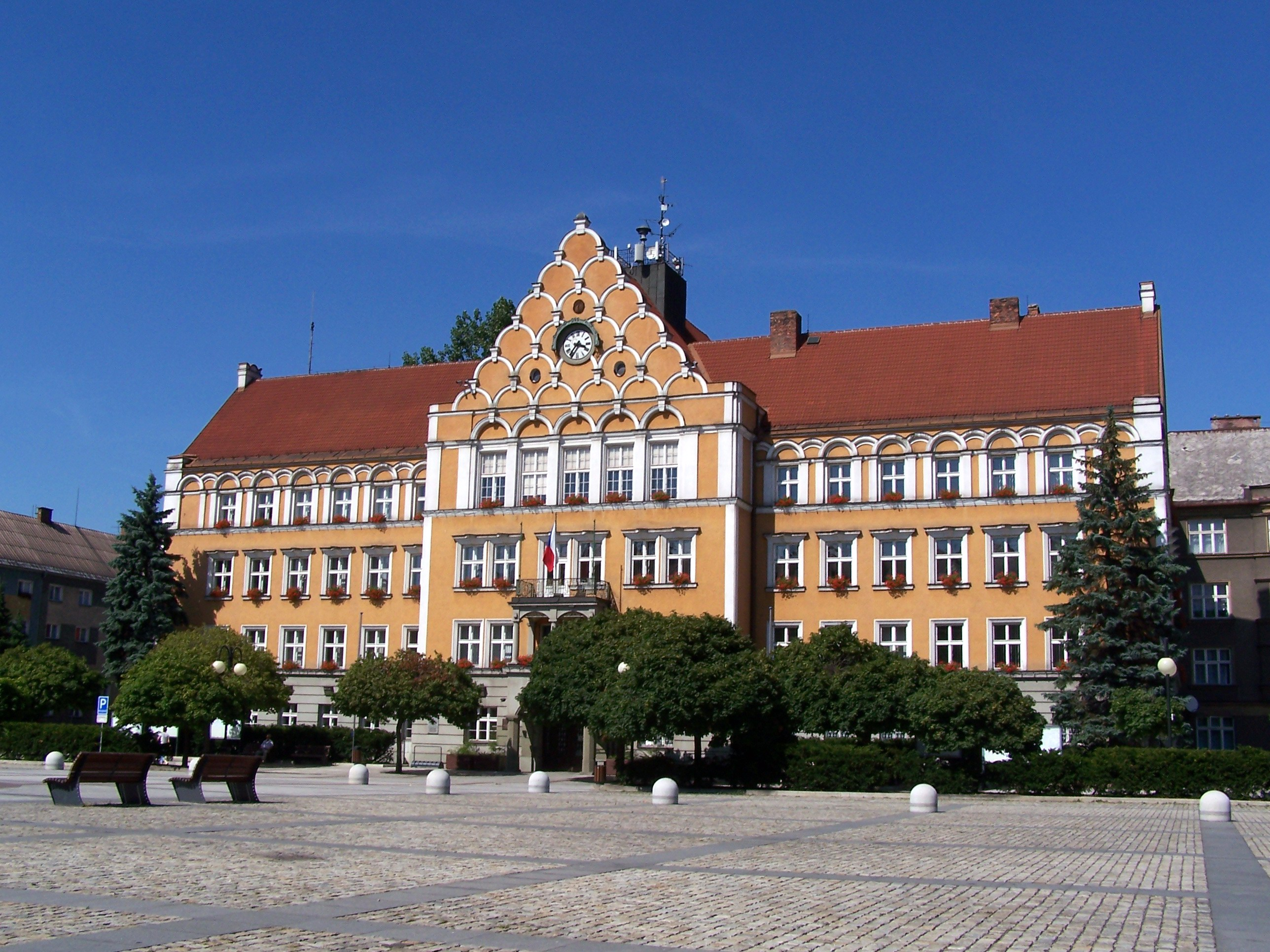
- Town hall

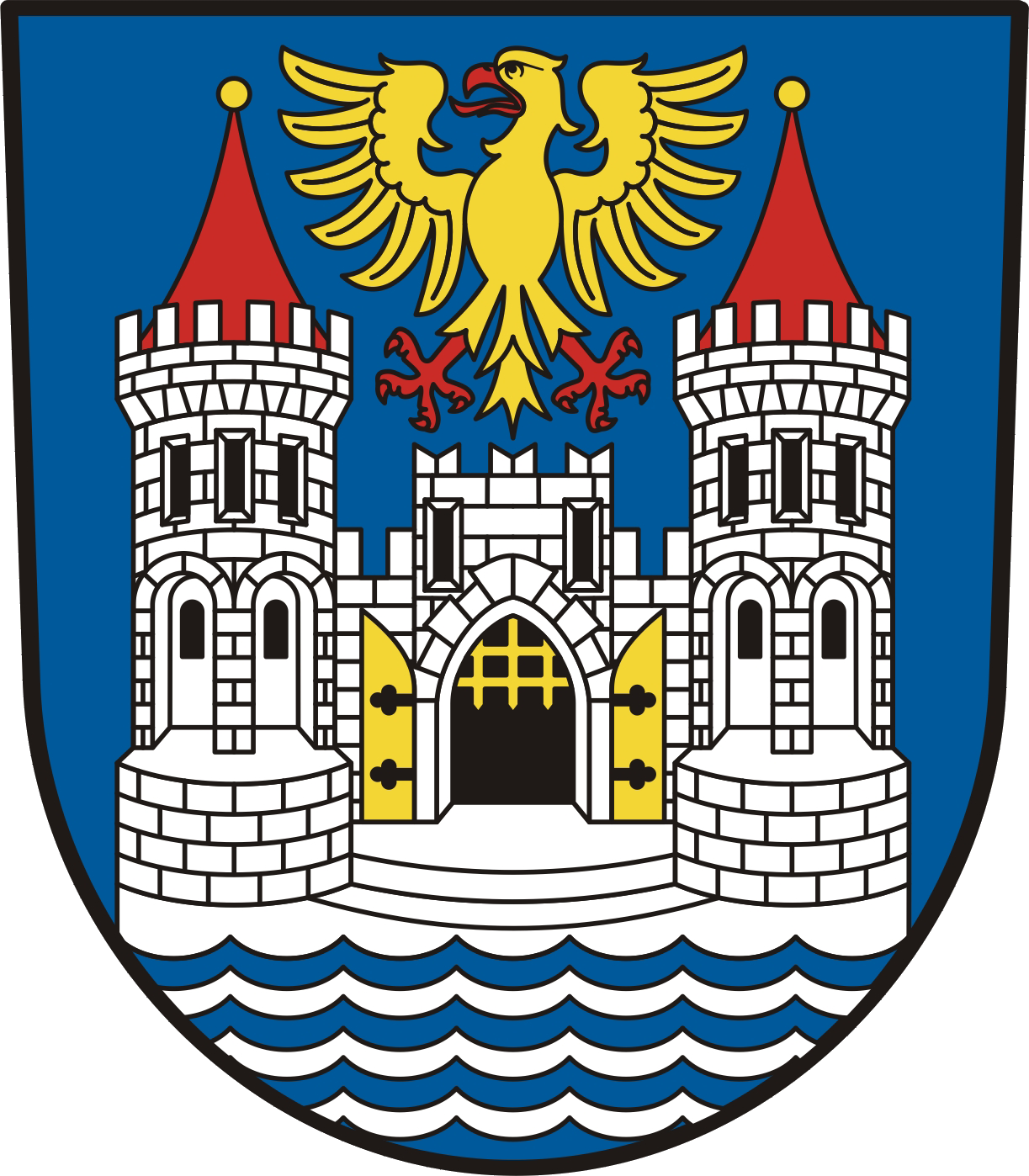
- Flag Coat of arms

- Location in the Czech Republic
- Coordinates: 49°44′46″N 18°37′34″E
- Country: Czech Republic
- Region: Moravian-Silesian
- District: Karviná
- First mentioned: 1155

Government
  - Mayor: Karel Kula

Area
  - Total: 33.79 km^{2} (13.05 sq mi)
- Elevation: 270 m (890 ft)

Population (2026-01-01)
  - Total: 22,870
  - Density: 676.8/km^{2} (1,753/sq mi)
- Time zone: UTC+1 (CET)
  - Summer (DST): UTC+2 (CEST)
- Postal codes: 735 62, 737 01
- Website: www.tesin.cz

Český Těšín (Czech pronunciation: [ˈtʃɛskiː ˈcɛʃiːn]; Polish: Czeski Cieszyn; German: Tschechisch-Teschen) is a town in Karviná District in the Moravian-Silesian Region of the Czech Republic. It has about 23,000 inhabitants.

Český Těšín lies on the west bank of the Olza River, in the heart of the historical region of Cieszyn Silesia. Until the 1920 division of the region between Poland and Czechoslovakia it was just a western suburb of the town of Teschen, which after the division fell to Poland as Cieszyn. The combined population of the Czech and Polish parts of the town is around 55,000.

The historic centre in Český Těšín is well preserved and is protected as an urban monument zone.

== Administrative division ==
Český Těšín consists of seven municipal parts (in brackets population according to the 2021 census):

- Český Těšín (18,224)
- Dolní Žukov (1,318)
- Horní Žukov (850)
- Koňákov (356)
- Mistřovice (567)
- Mosty (1,253)
- Stanislavice (562)

== Geography ==
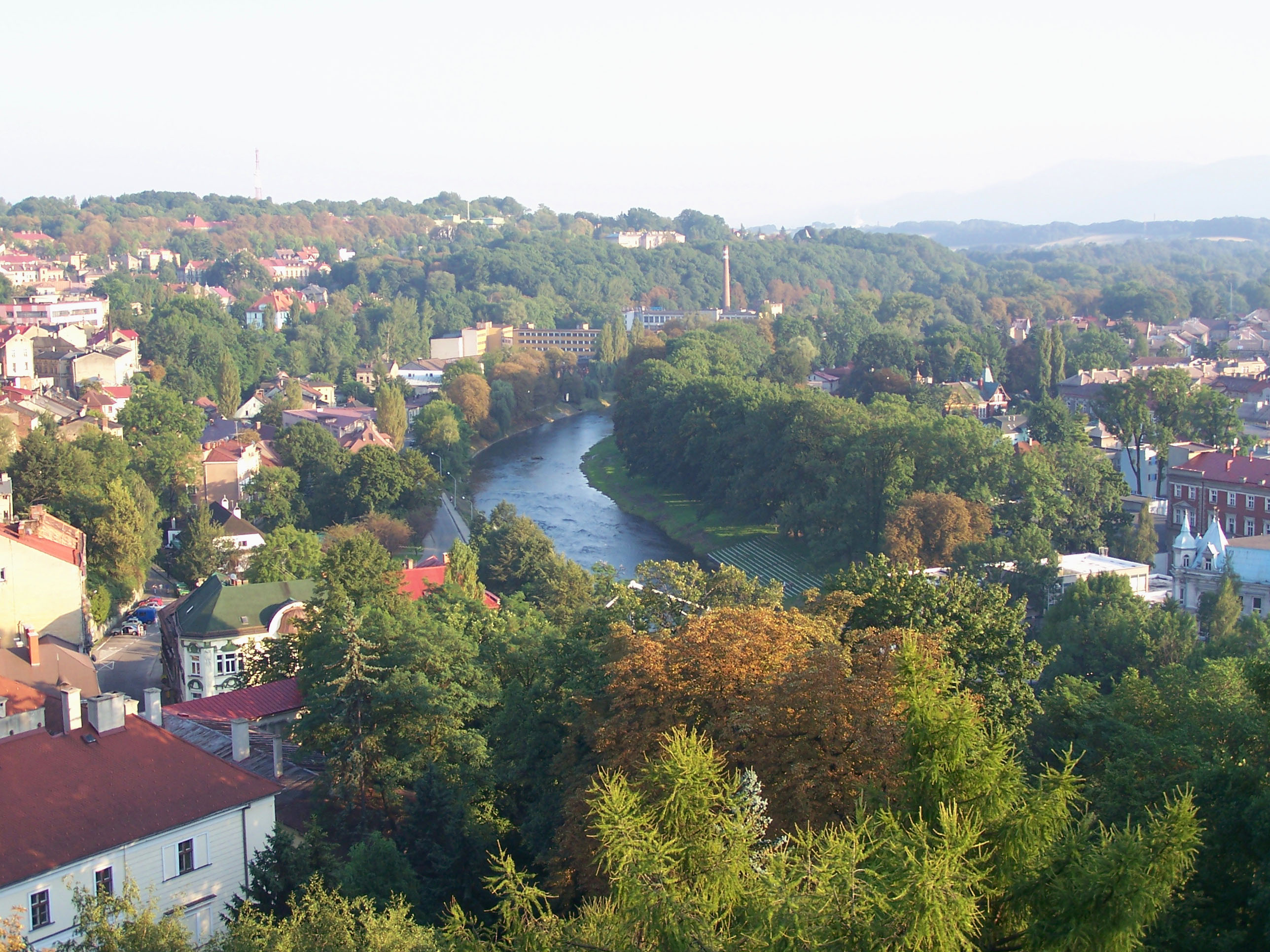
Český Těšín (right), Cieszyn (left) and the Olza River (centre)

Český Těšín is located about 12 kilometres (7 mi) south of Karviná and 23 km (14 mi) east of Ostrava. It lies on the border with Poland in the historical region of Cieszyn Silesia and is a twin city with the Polish city of Cieszyn. The town is situated in the Moravian-Silesian Foothills, on the left bank of the Olza River. The highest point is the hill Šachta at 427 m (1,401 ft) above sea level.

== History ==
The first written mention of Těšín is from 1155, when a castle called Tescin was mentioned in a deed of Pope Adrian IV. In 1290, the settlement was first referred to as a town.

The area was originally a small western suburb of the town of Cieszyn, the capital of the Duchy of Cieszyn, which was established in 1290, during the fragmentation of Poland into smaller duchies. It was ruled by the Piast dynasty until 1653, and by the Habsburg dynasty afterwards. Under Austrian rule, it was known under its Germanized name Teschen. It was known for its national and cultural diversity, consisting mostly of German, Polish, Jewish and Czech communities. In 1849, the western part of Teschen was home to only 14.9% of the town's total population: in 1880 24% and in 1910 33.4%. There was also a small but lively Hungarian community in the town, mostly officers and administrative workers.

From 1870 (when the Košice–Bohumín Railway was put into operation) until 1914, there was a construction boom and the districts that forms the today's Český Těšín were built.

According to the Austrian census of 1910, Teschen had 22,489 inhabitants, 13,254 (61.5%) of them were German-speaking, 6,832 (31.7%) were Polish-speaking and 1,437 (6.6%) were Czech-speaking. The most populous religious groups were Roman Catholics with 15,138 (67.3%) followed by Protestants with 5,174 (23%) and the Jews with 2,112 (9.4%).

Following the fall of Austria-Hungary, Czech and Polish local governments were established. Both of them claimed that the whole of Cieszyn Silesia belonged to Czechoslovakia or Poland respectively. To calm down the friction which developed, the local governments concluded an interim agreement on division of the area running along ethnic lines. The division line imposed by the interim agreement was seen as unacceptable by the central Czechoslovak government, mainly because the crucial railway connecting the Czech lands with eastern Slovakia was controlled by Poland, and access to that railway was vital for Czechoslovakia at that time.

Despite the division being only interim, Poland decided to organise elections to the Sejm (Polish parliament) in the area. To prevent this, Czechoslovakia decided to attack the Polish part of the region on 23 January 1919. After the Polish–Czechoslovak War, Czechoslovakia forced Poland, which was at that time at war also with the West Ukrainian National Republic, to withdraw from the larger part of the area. After a ceasefire, the entire area was divided by the decision of the Spa Conference from July 1920, thus in practice creating the Trans-Olza area, leaving a sizable Polish minority on the Czech side and dividing the town of Cieszyn between the two states.

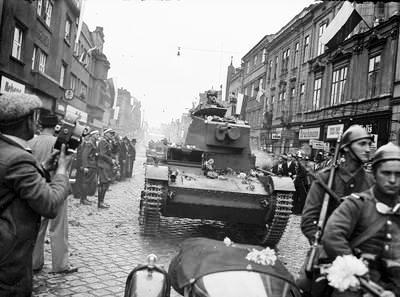
Polish Army entering Český Těšín in October 1938

Český Těšín was then the centre of Český Těšín District, existing in the years 1920–1938 and 1945–1960.

In 1938, following the Munich Agreement allowing the German annexation of the Sudetenland, Poland coerced Czechoslovakia to surrender the region of Trans-Olza (including Český Těšín). Following negotiations with Czech authorities, Polish troops and authorities entered it on 2 October 1938, and the territory was annexed by Poland and again joined to Cieszyn. After the German invasion of Poland in 1939, the entire territory was annexed by Nazi Germany. In 1941, Nazi Germany established the Stalag VIII-D prisoner-of-war camp for Polish, French, Belgian, British and Serbian POWs, which in September 1942 was converted into a subcamp of the Stalag VIII-B camp. After the war, the sizeable German-speaking community was expelled in accordance with the Potsdam Agreement, and the 1920 borders were restored.

=== Jewish community ===
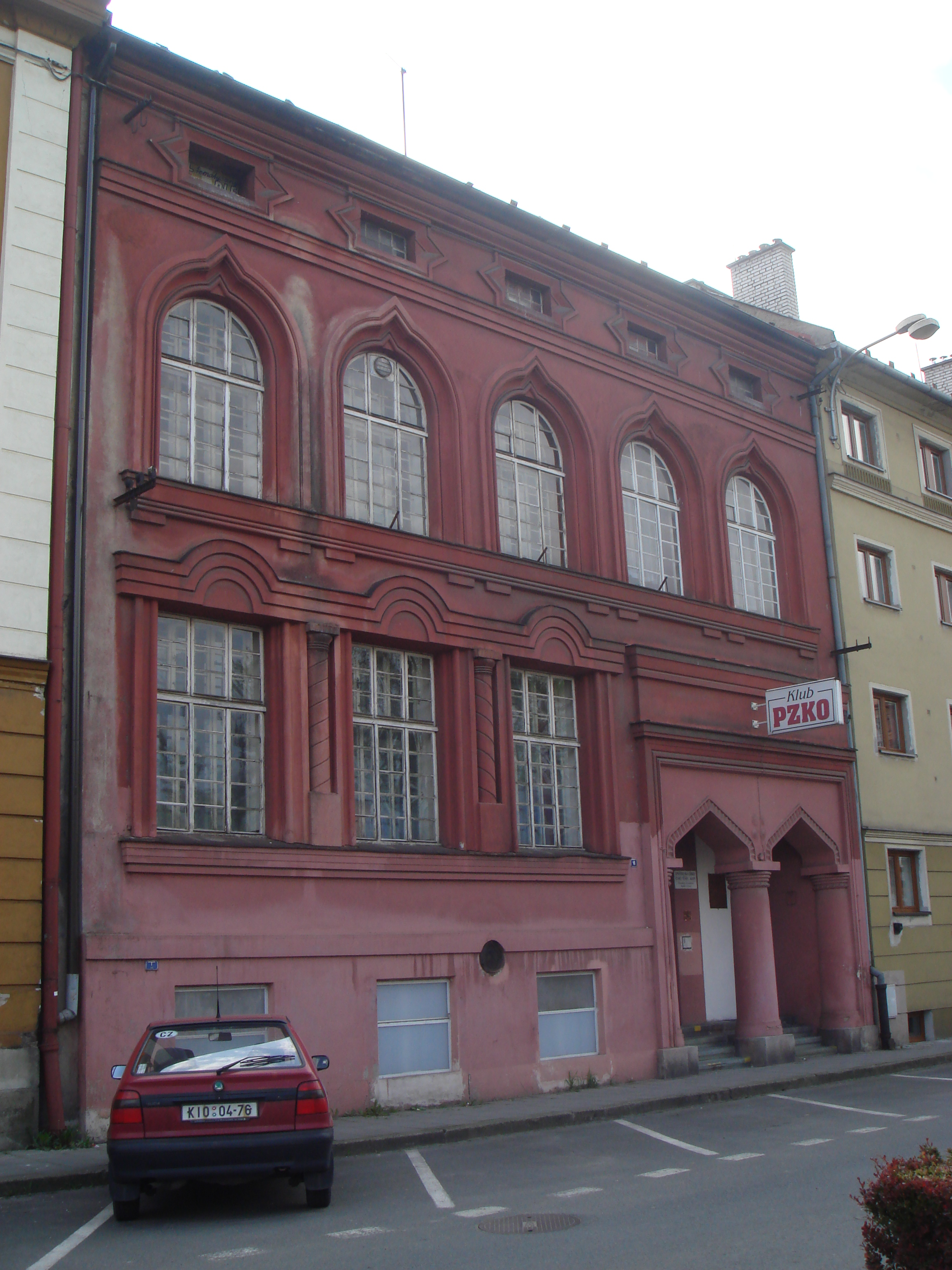
Former Schomre Schabos synagogue

The first Jews in the area of Český Těšín were first documented in the early 18th century. The oldest Jewish prayer houses had existed in Český Těšín since the early 20th century. It was run by the Schomre Schabos (Guardians of Shabbat) society. After 1869 the Jewish minority increased rapidly and in 1914 they made up 40% of the Těšín population. They significantly contributed to the establishment, development and maintenance of trade contacts with neighbouring countries.

After the division of Teschen in 1920, there were no synagogues and cemetery in the Czech part of the town, and new ones had to be established. The Jewish Community of Český Těšín was established in 1923.

In 1938, there was a sizeable Jewish minority in the town, about 1,500 in Cieszyn and 1,300 in Český Těšín. Nearly all of them were killed by Nazi Germany in concentration camps. Most of the synagogues were destroyed. Today, only one synagogue still stands in the town, used as a Polish cultural centre.

== Demographics ==
As of 2021, the Poles make up 14.3% of the town's population,. The town is an important cultural and educational centre of the Polish minority in the Czech Republic. The number of Poles is however decreasing as a result of continuing assimilation. Although a border town, there is no longer any real ethnic tension between Czechs and Poles.

Historical population

Year	Pop.	±%
1869	5,423	—
1880	7,439	+37.2%
1890	8,492	+14.2%
1900	10,656	+25.5%
1910	13,214	+24.0%

Year	Pop.	±%
1921	14,559	+10.2%
1930	17,620	+21.0%
1950	17,036	−3.3%
1961	18,462	+8.4%
1970	18,549	+0.5%

Year	Pop.	±%
1980	22,155	+19.4%
1991	27,721	+25.1%
2001	26,429	−4.7%
2011	24,394	−7.7%
2021	23,130	−5.2%

Source: Censuses

=== Religion ===
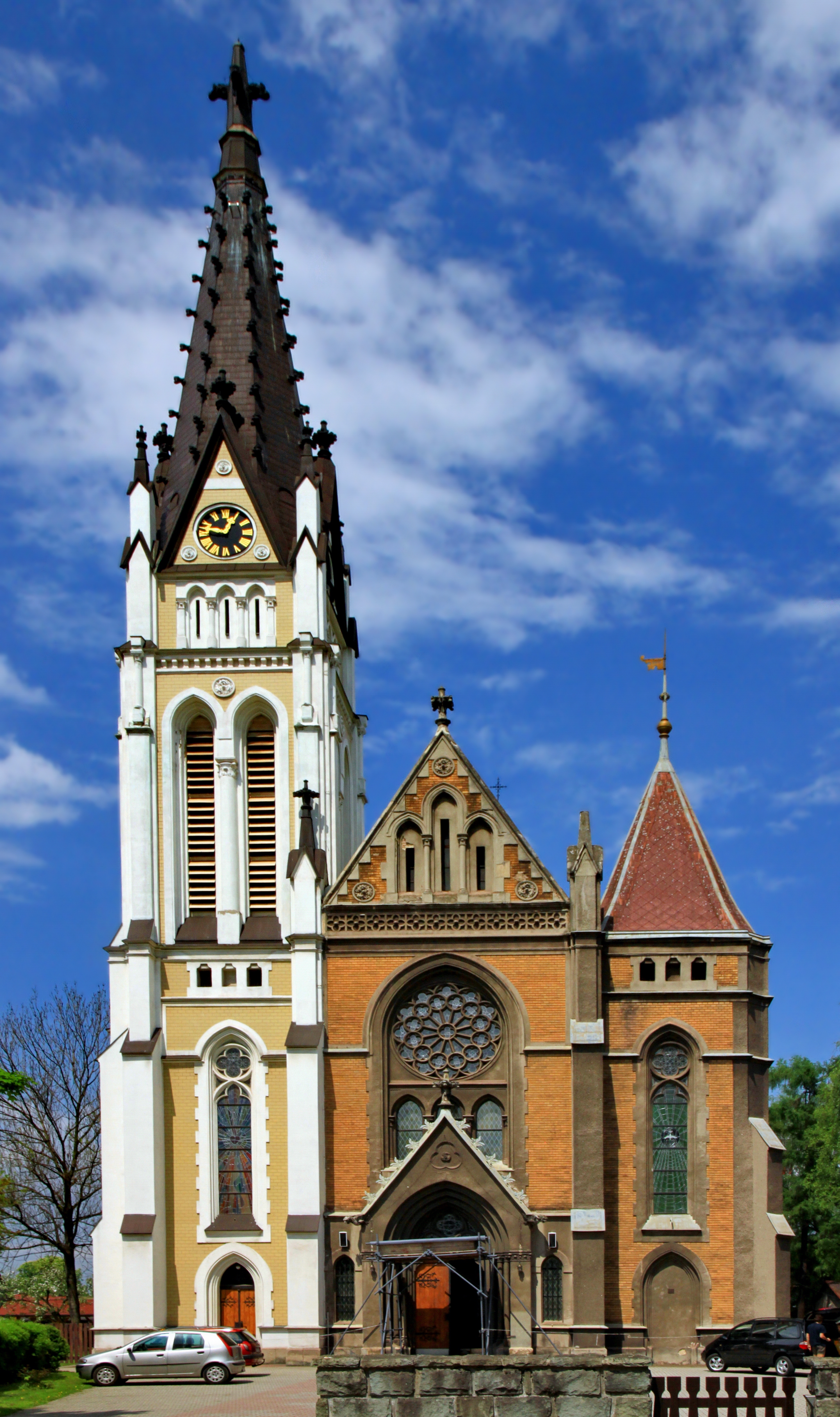
Church of the Sacred Heart of Jesus

The diversity of the town is not only ethnic, but also religious. Many Christian denominations are present in the town. In the past a large Jewish community lived there. According to the 2021 census, 31.6% of the population is religious, out of whom 34.4% are Roman Catholics, and 3.7% are Czech Brethren.

== Economy ==
The largest industrial employer based in the town is Kovona System, which is engaged in production of metal products. It employs about 600 people. The second notable industrial company is Finidr, one of the biggest producers of hardback and paperback books in Central Europe with about 800 employers.

== Transport ==
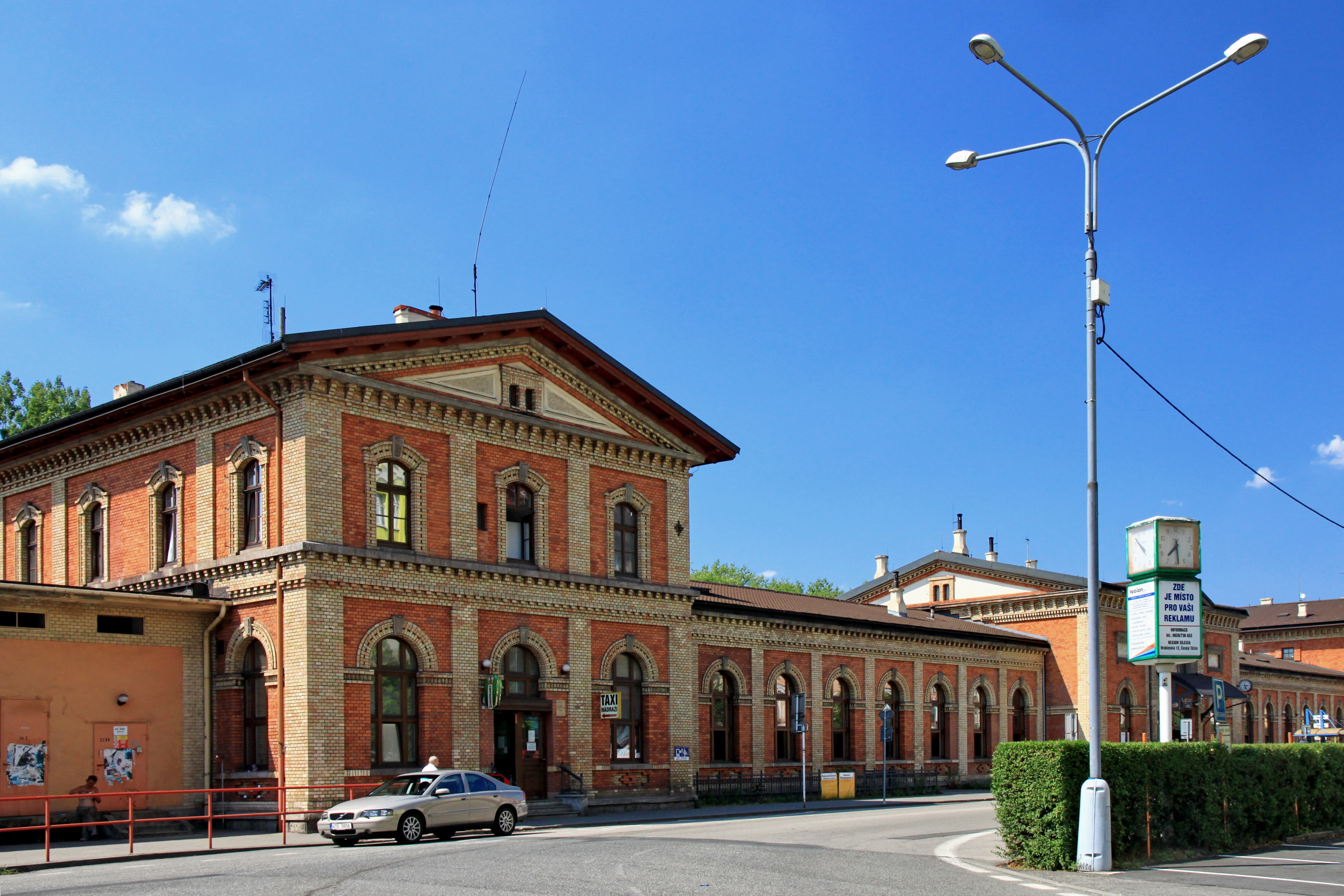
Railway station

The D48 motorway (here part of the European routes E75 and E462) connects Český Těšín with Frýdek-Místek. Behind the Český Těšín / Cieszyn road border crossing, it continues in Poland as the Expressway S52. The I/11 road connects Český Těšín with Ostrava.

Český Těšín is located on the international railway line Prague–Košice and on the regional railway lines Ostrava–Mosty u Jablunkova and Český Těšín–Frýdek-Místek.

== Culture ==
Těšín Theatre has Czech and Polish ensembles, where plays are presented in both the Czech and Polish languages. It is one of the few theatres outside Poland which has a professional Polish ensemble.

== Education ==
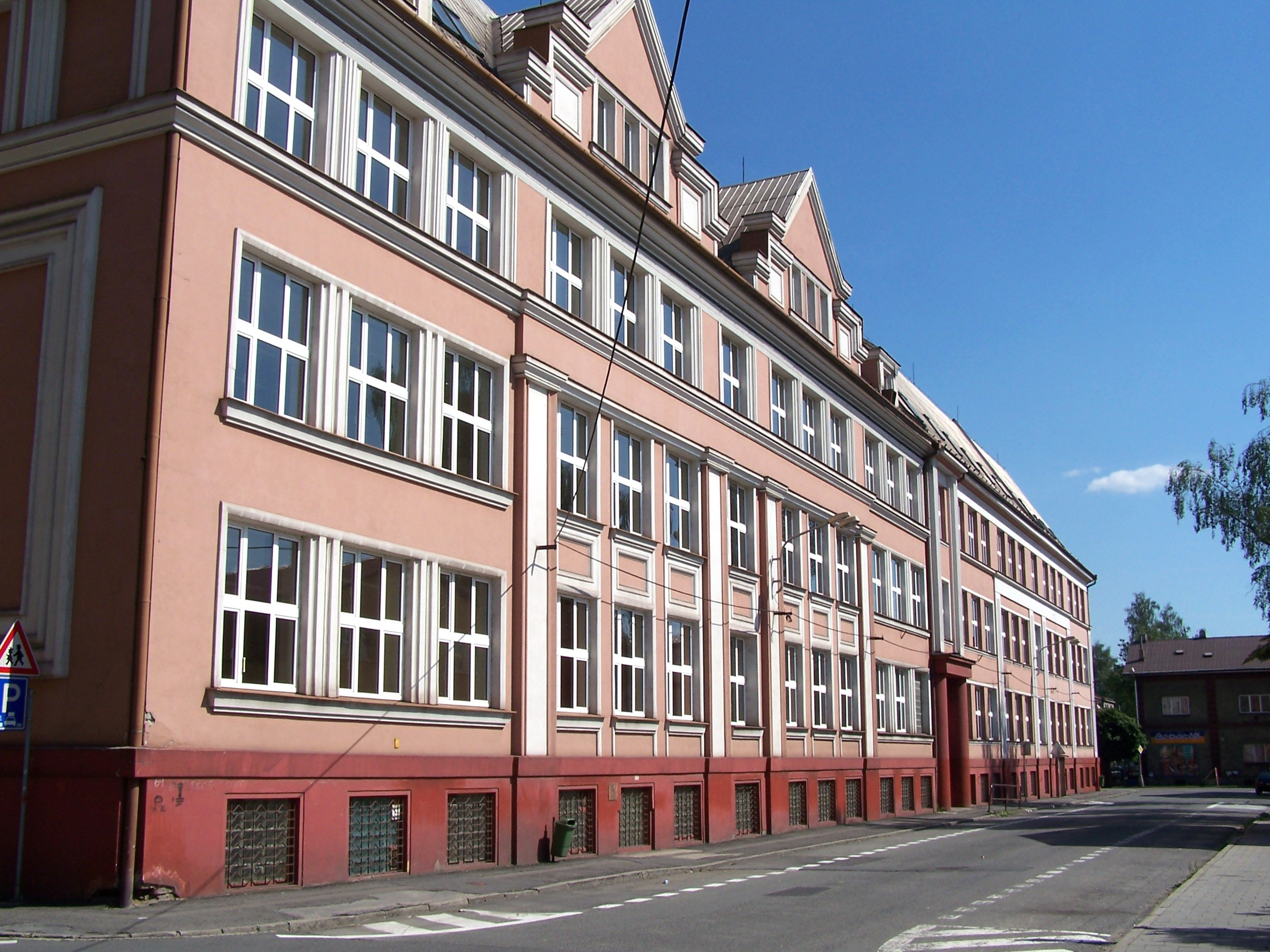
Polish primary school and gymnasium

Alongside several Czech primary schools and one gymnasium, the town has both a Polish primary school and a gymnasium. The Pedagogical Centre for Polish National Education in Český Těšín takes care of the needs of schools with the Polish teaching language in the Czech Republic.

== Sights ==
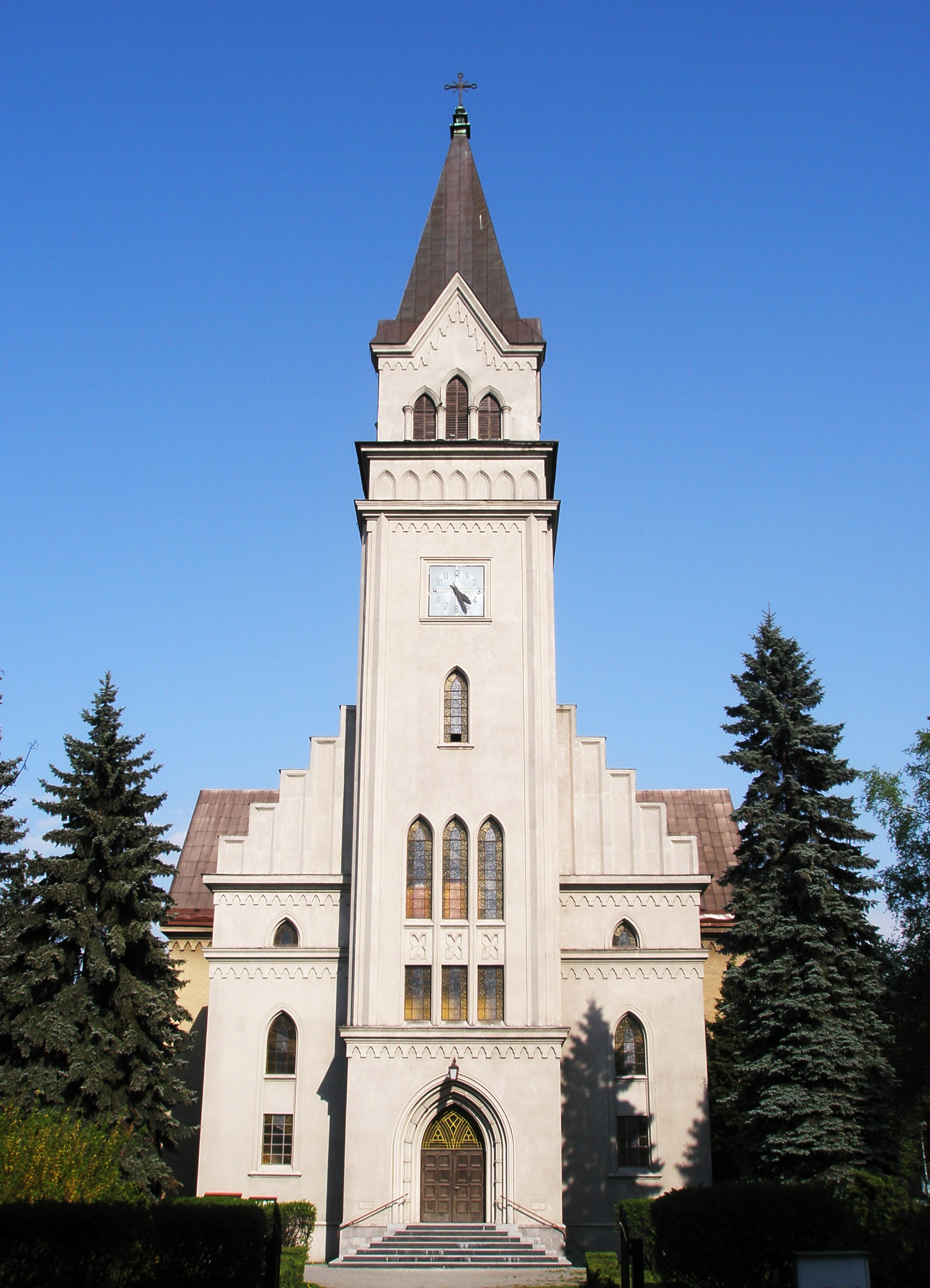
Lutheran church

There is six church buildings in the town. The oldest is the Neo-Gothic Catholic Church of the Sacred Heart of Jesus, built by architect Ludwig Satzky in 1893–1894.

After the division of Teschen in 1920, there were no Lutheran churches in Český Těšín. In 1927 the local German population built a Lutheran church in the town, and in 1932 the second Lutheran church was built. The church of the Evangelical Church of Czech Brethren was constructed in 1929.

In 1928–1929 the Jewish community built a new synagogue on Breitegasse Street, which is to date the only synagogue in the town which still stands. It was the only synagogue not destroyed by Nazis due to its proximity to other residential buildings. In 1967 the building was bought by the Polish Cultural and Educational Union. It is not protected as a cultural monument. Together with fragment of the Jewish cemetery, which was established in 1926, it is the only Jewish monument in the town.

The railway station was built in the Neo-Renaissance style in 1889 and belongs to the most valuable railway station buildings in the country.

The town hall is the landmark of the town square. The 54 metres (177 ft)-long building was built in 1928.

Český Těšín is home to the Museum of Cieszyn Silesia, founded in 1948.

== Notable people ==
- Jiří Třanovský (1592–1637), Protestant scholar and poet
- Simon R. Blatteis (1876–1968), New York pathologist
- Viktor Ullmann (1898–1944), Jewish composer and musician
- Ludvík Aškenazy (1921–1986), Jewish writer
- Terry Haass (1923–2016), French painter
- František Vláčil (1924–1999), film director
- Jaromír Hanzlík (born 1948), actor
- Jiří Drahoš (born 1949), chemist and politician
- Jaromír Nohavica (born 1953), musician; lived here
- Luděk Čajka (1963–1990), ice hockey player
- Przemysław Branny (1970–2026), Polish actor and singer

== Twin towns – sister cities ==
Český Těšín is twinned with:

- Cieszyn, Poland
- Rožňava, Slovakia

== Gallery ==
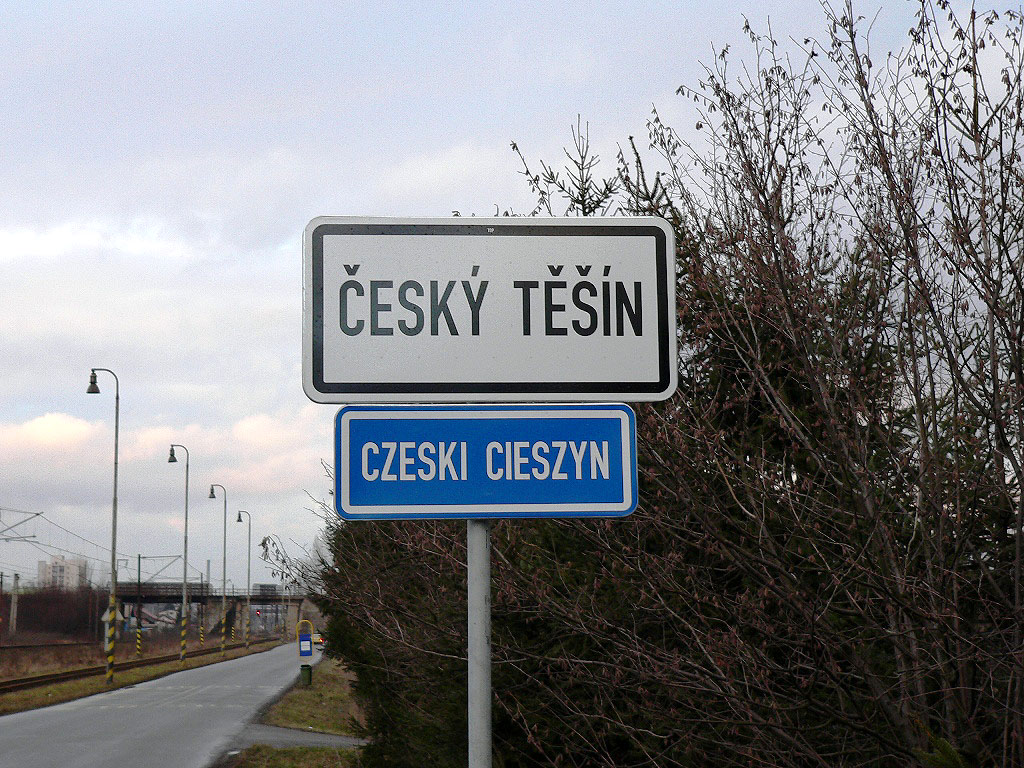
Bilingual signs at town limits

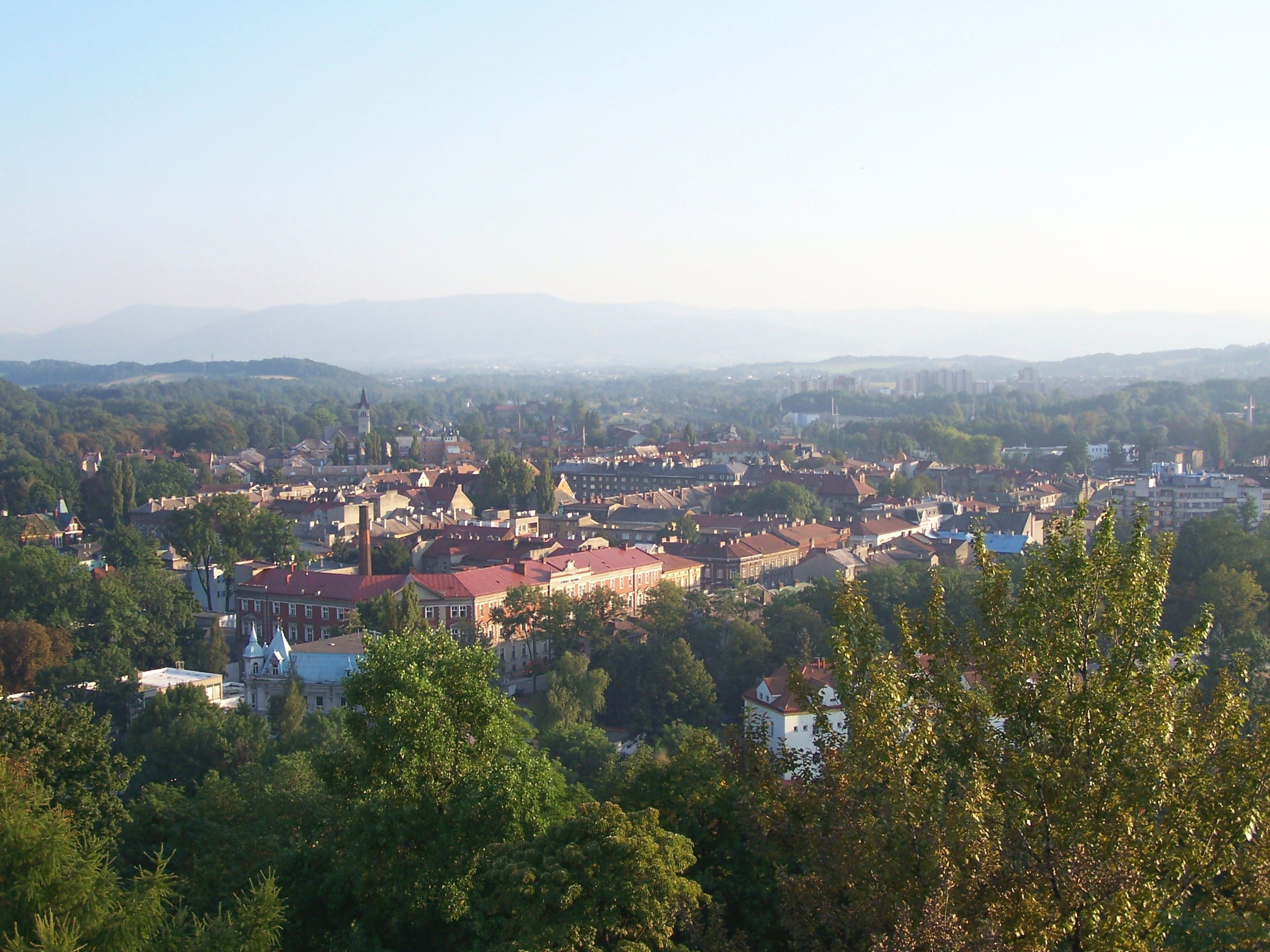
Český Těšín

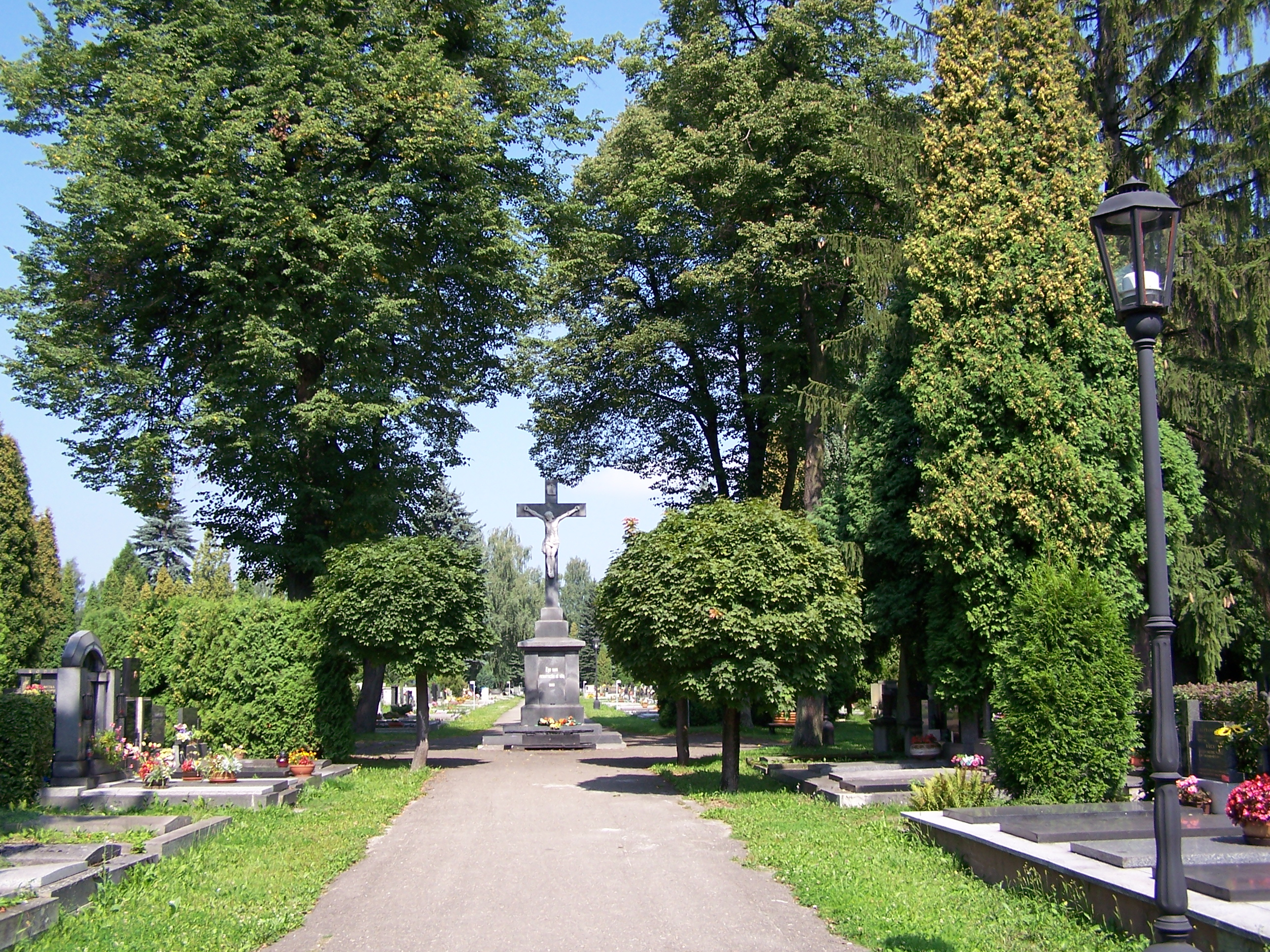
Cemetery

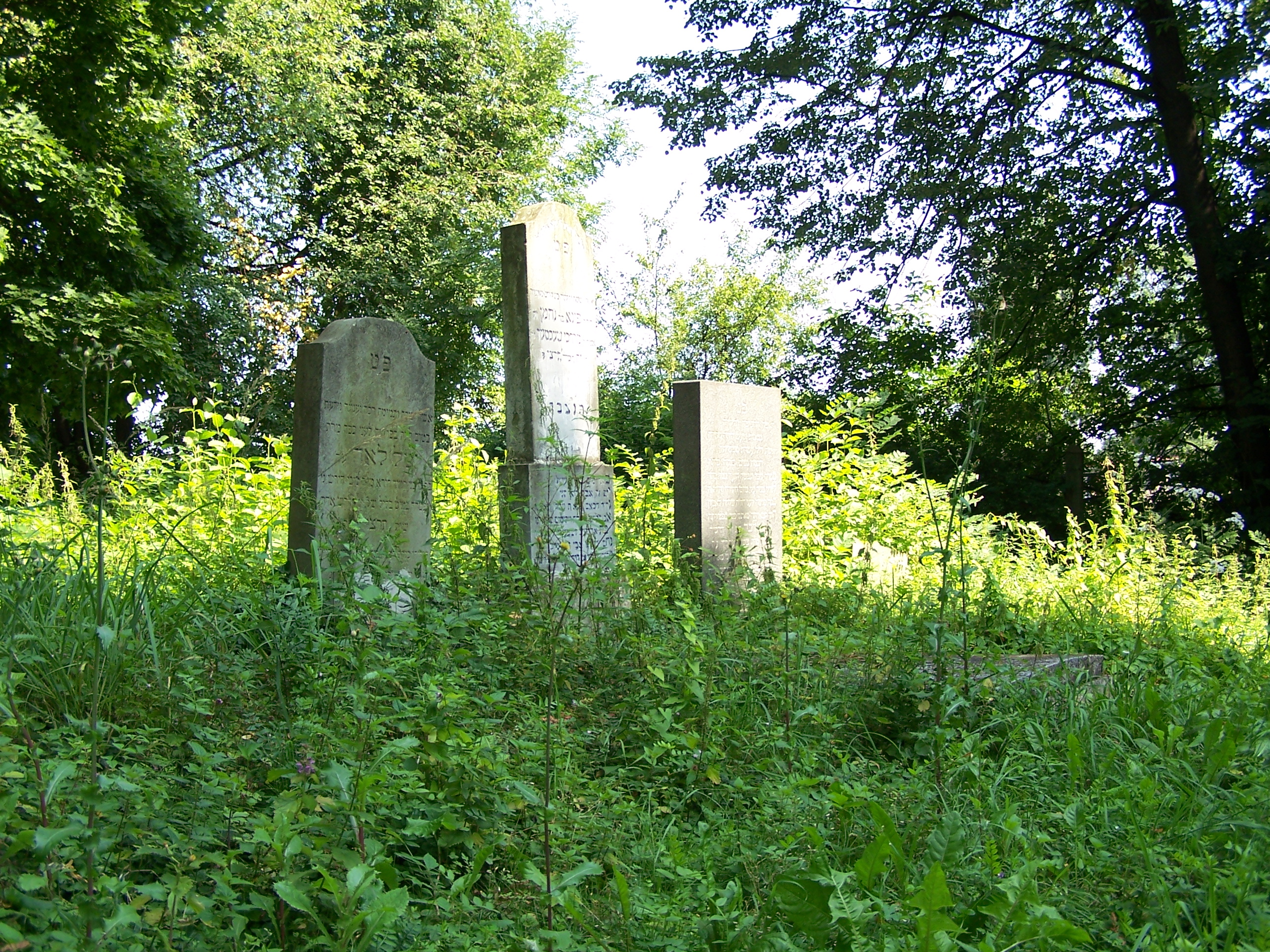
Fragment of abandoned Jewish cemetery

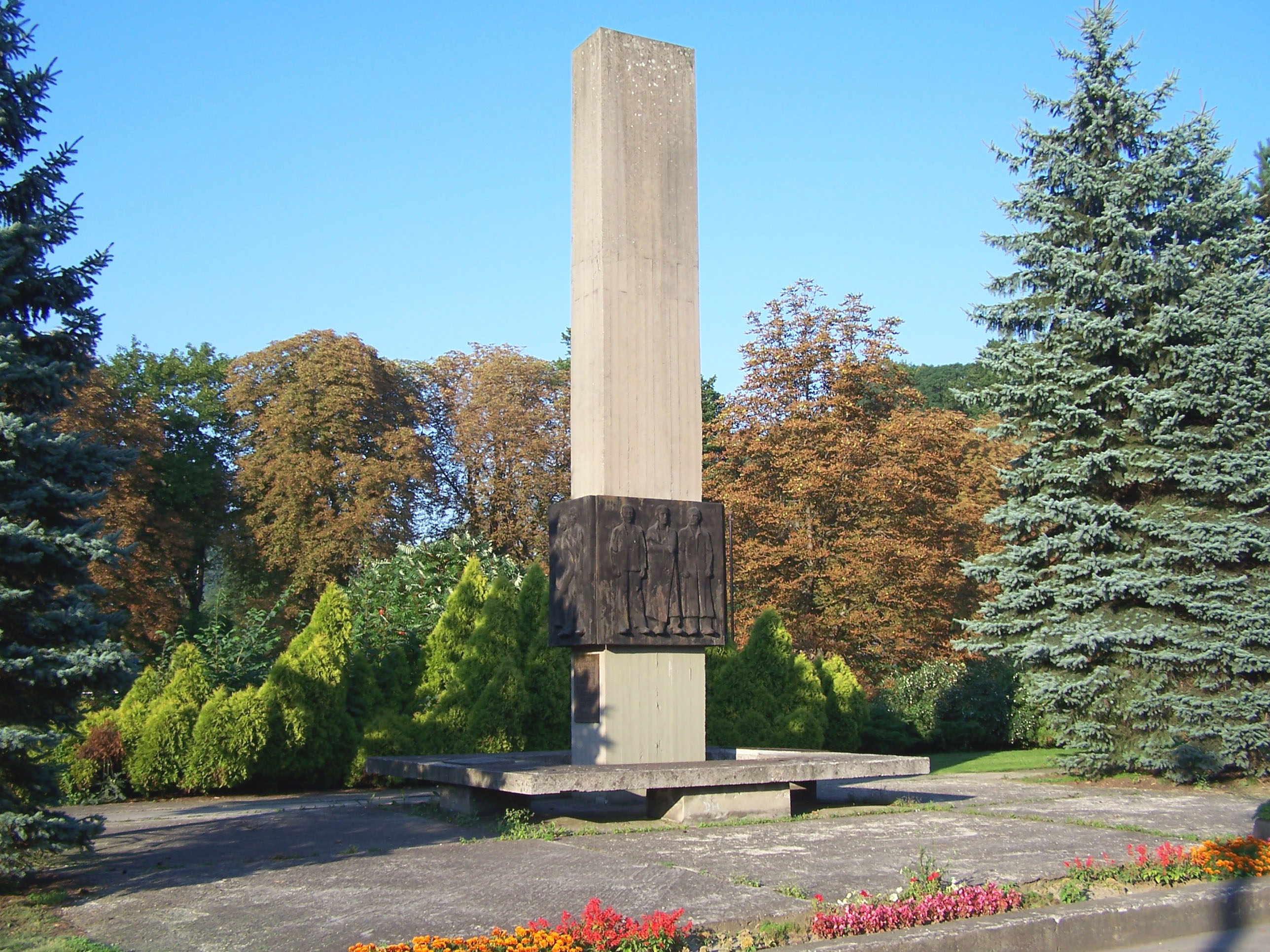
Memorial dedicated to World War II resistance fighters

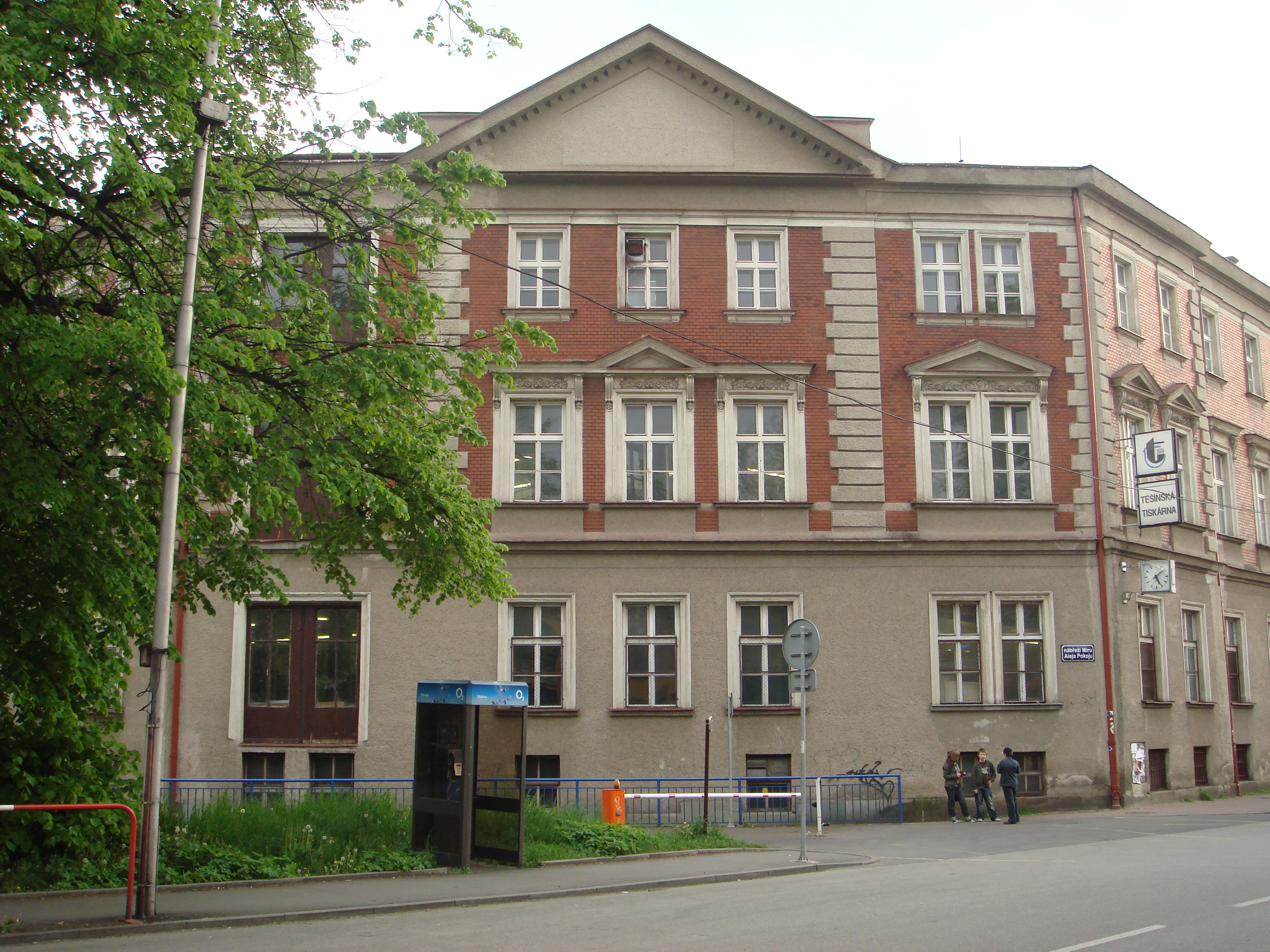
Těšín printing works
