= Cieszyn Town Hall =

Town Hall in Cieszyn
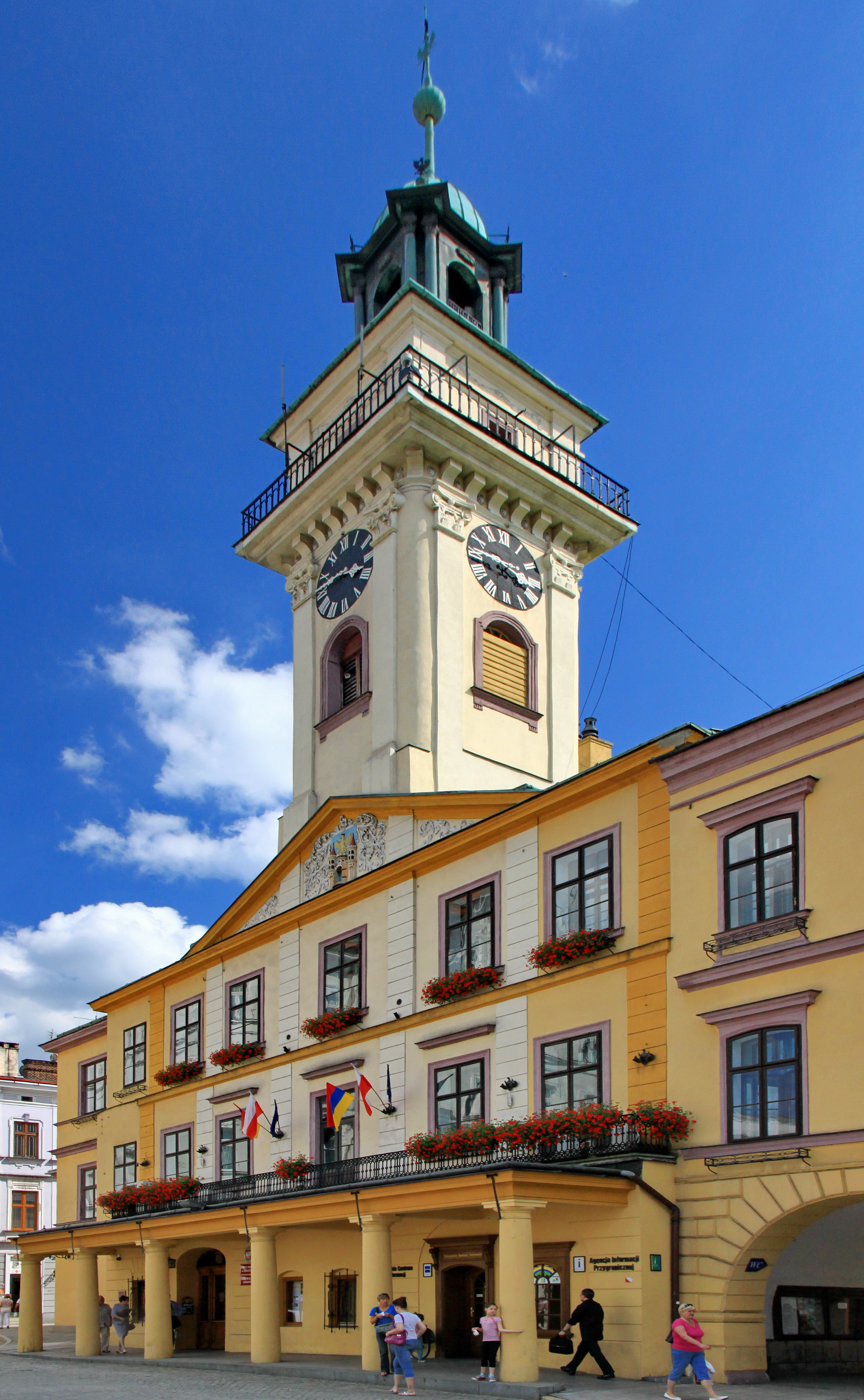
- Town Hall in Cieszyn

- Location within Poland

General information
- Architectural style: Classicism
- Location: Rynek 1, Cieszyn, Cieszyn, Poland
- Coordinates: 49°44′53.54″N 18°37′59.50″E
- Completed: 1496 (original town hall)
- Renovated: 1801

Design and construction
- Architect: Ignacy Chambrez (renovation in 1801)

The Town Hall in Cieszyn is a historic town hall in Cieszyn, Poland. It is located in the corner of the southern frontage of the Town Square and Srebrna Street.

== History ==
Initially, until 1496, Cieszyn town hall was made of wood and situated in the middle of the old market square. When the borders of the market square were marked in 1496, prince Casimir II ordered the building of a brick town hall with a wooden tower. This town hall burned down in 1552. It was rebuilt but damaged once again during the Thirty Years' War. The town hall was renovated in 1661. Krzysztof Palm decorated its façade with rich painting. It included, inter alia, a picture of Virgin Mary with Baby Jesus and St. Wenceslas and coats of arms of the Duchy of Cieszyn and the town as well as personifications of Faith, Hope, Wisdom and Justice entwined in a ribbon with a sentence in Latin: Haec domus odit, punit, conservat, honorat: nequitiam, pace, orimina, iura, probus (This house hates iniquity, loves peace, punishes crimes, supports the virtuous, honours the worthy). In approx. 1670 on the spot of the former wooden tower a new one, made of brick, was built.

The town hall was damaged once again in the fire of 1720. Another building was finished in 1788 thanks to an initiative of father Leopold Szersznik and then destroyed by another fire on 6 May 1789 - the largest fire in the history of Cieszyn. A new Classicist, two-storey town hall with a seven axes façade was designed by Ignacy Chambrez. The building was inaugurated in 1800. Construction of the hall tower lasted from 10 March to 1 September 1801. The town hall had a storied guard room with a high, garett roof. A part adjacent to the town hall had an arcade passage that joined the market square with Ratuszowa Street.

In 1818 an architect Florian Jilg added a theatre hall. The town hall burned down partially in 1836. The interior was rebuilt in 1846 according to the plans of Joseph Kornhäusel, the façade was designed by Andrzej Kmenta. The meeting hall of the Town Council was decorated by a frieze designed by Albin Prokop, composed of armorial shields of the Cieszyn gentry and guilds operating in the town. A solemn opening of the town hall was carried out by the emperor Franz Joseph I. By 2006 his portrait was hanging on a wall of the meeting hall and was replaced by a 19th-century coat of arms of Cieszyn.

Summer 1984 saw the renovation of the town hall tower, which was in a poor condition.

== Architecture ==
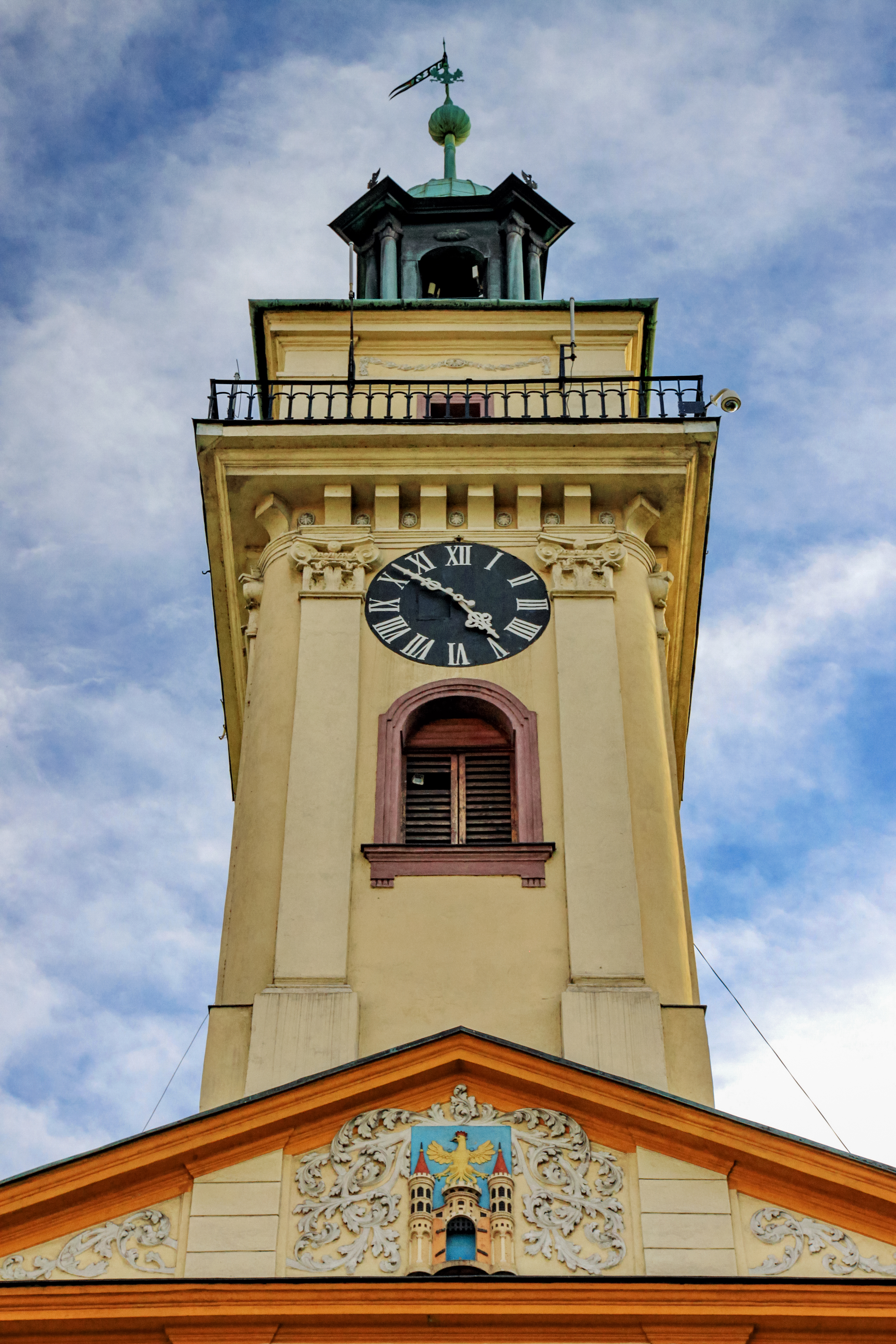
Tower of the town hall in Cieszyn. Coat of arms of Cieszyn visible in the tympanum.

The town hall has undergone numerous reconstructions over time, and its current architectural style is characterized as Baroque-Classicistic. Situated on the southern side of the market square, it is designed in a square layout with a slightly recessed northeastern corner. The building features three stories, with a prominent clock tower integrated centrally into its structure. The facade of the building was built according to the plans of Andrzej Kment. In its central part there is a 6-axes projection based on six pillars surmounted by a triangle pediment with the coat of arms of Cieszyn and a floral ornament. Vertical divisions of the façade form rusticated pilaster strips, between which a window in profiled frames is located. The second floor is separated by a ledge.

The town hall tower is erected on the square plan with rounded corners, decorated by Corinthian pilasters that support a notable ledge on cantilevers and a porch with an iron balustrade. Windows of the tower in its lower part are closed by a full arch. In the upper part the windows are square. All of them have profiled frames. The tower is covered by a tin tent roof crowned by a quadrilateral lantern with doubled columns in the corners. The access to the tower is a 19th-century slatted door with fittings. The tower clock is equipped with a mechanism made by Johan Chris Boeck from Austria in 1851. There are bells from the 18th century in the tower; the first one has a badge with a presentation of Saint Michael; the second was made by Johan Grosmein from Weiten.

The interior is arranged according to a three-tract corridor plan. In the basement there are rooms with barrel vaults on straps and sail straps. On the ground floor in the central part of the built there is a hallway with cross-and-barrel vault with straps based on pilasters and wall-contacting pillars. From the side of Srebrna Street there is a second hallway, covered by a modular arch and partly by a sail vault, with additional light provided by a skylight with two windows. The main staircase has a barrel vault with a segment arch. The stairs have three legs, the central leg opened to the inside of the staircase by three arches with a pattern of a basket arch, based on pillars. The walls of the corridor are decorated by wall-contacting pillars. Some of the rooms on the ground floor have a barrel vault with lunettes, cross-barrel; vault or sail vault. On the first floor there is a hall with three fields of sail vaults on straps in the back tract of the building, and on the second floor there are two rooms in the front tract with a sail vault and a vault on straps and a representatives meeting hall.

== Session hall ==
In 1906 the District Court was moved to a building at Garncarska Street. The premises formerly used by the court were used for offices of the town management and for meetings: a smaller room for sessions of various commissions and a bigger one for sessions of the Town Council. A new meeting hall of the town council was equipped with richly decorated elm panelling and a door frame, manufactured by the carpenter Maximilian Schubert. In two corners of the hall two Art Nouveau stoves - fireplaces with coats of arms of Cieszyn, made in "Thonoffenfabrik" of R. Weiss in Frydek were placed. In the third corner a cabinet clock made in the workshop of Francis Dibon, a clockmaker from Cieszyn, was located. The decoration of the hall was a heraldic frieze placed under a partially gilded, stucco ceiling. The ceiling was composed of 24 bas-relief crests of Cieszyn guilds made by a sculptor Francis Karger according to a design of Jerzy Frisch and Leonard Hulk. The second part of the frieze included 39 coats of arms of Dukes of Cieszyn, representatives of the gentry of Cieszyn as well as coats of arms of Silesia and Cieszyn. They were painted by Maximilian Salomon. The meeting hall was equipped with a set of furniture including seats, benches and tables. On the front wall an oil portrait of the emperor Franz Joseph was framed to the wood panelling. Between the windows seven portraits of parliamentarians painted by an Austrian painter Jan Daniel Donat were hung. On 6 May 1779 they signed the Treaty of Teschen. On the opposite wall there were seven oil portraits of the Habsburgs, who at the same time were Dukes of Cieszyn. The back wall was decorated by portraits of three founders of town foundations - count Adam Wacław Paczyński from Tenczyn, baron Karol Cselesta and baron Adam Borek. The author of the concept of the meeting room and its heraldic frieze was the construction adviser of the Chamber of Cieszyn Albin Teodor Prokop, who left a manuscript with a description of the hall with a history of its creation. The meeting hall of the town council was put into service on 2 September 1906, when the emperor Franz Joseph visited the town and paid a visit to the town hall.

== Trivia ==
Since 2014 the historic interior of the session hall of the Cieszyn town hall has been made available for wedding ceremonies.

At noon from the tower of the town hall a bugle call is played composed to commemorate 1150th anniversary of the legendary foundation of Cieszyn. It is based on a popular folk song: "Helo...Helo...Helenko...jakus Ci sie pasie?".
