= Kalembice =

Coordinates: 49°46′45″N 18°37′57″E

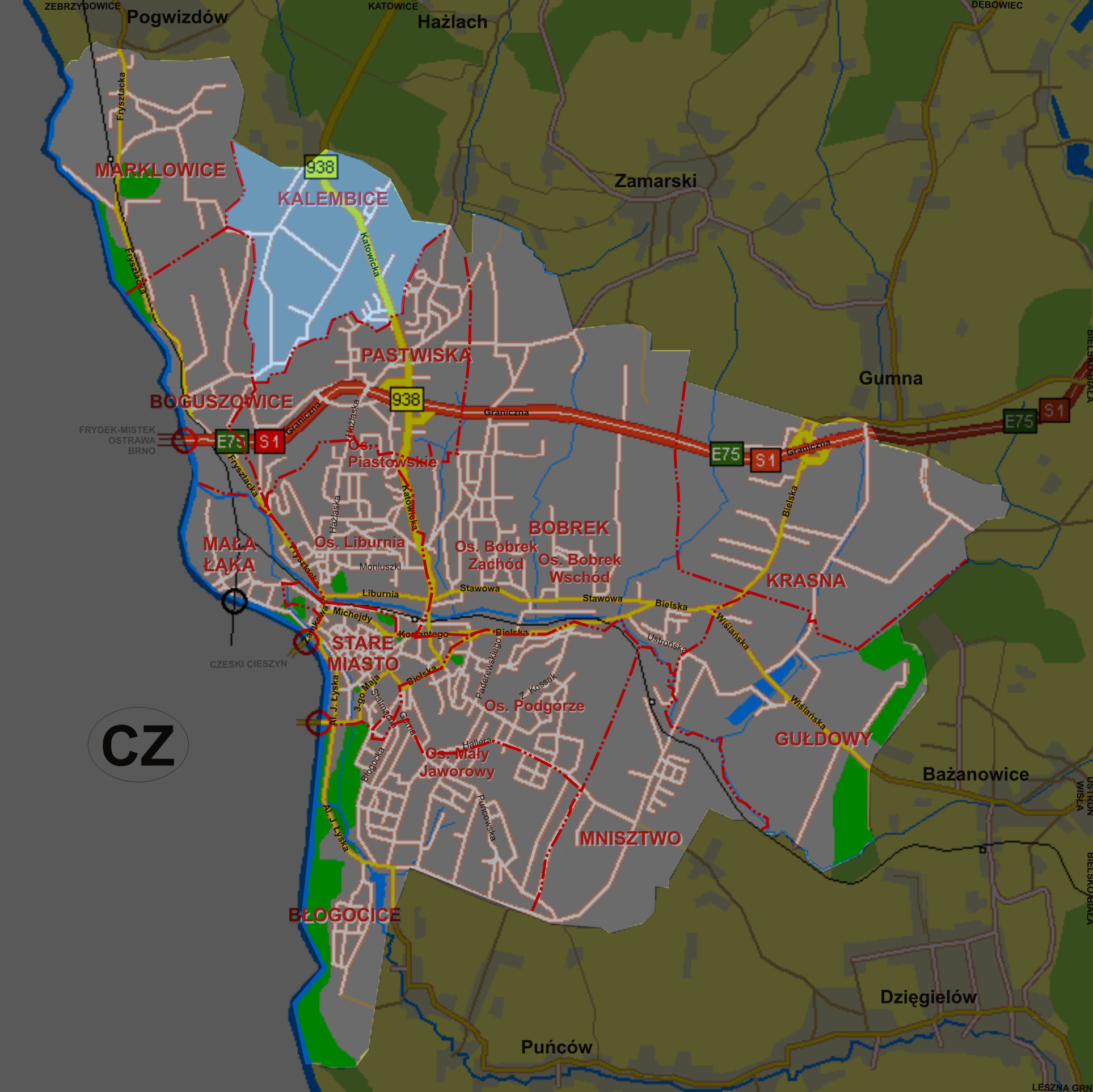
Kalembice highlighted on map of Cieszyn

Kalembice (German: Kalembitz) is a district of Cieszyn, Silesian Voivodeship, Poland. It was a separate municipality, but became administratively a part of Cieszyn in 1973.

The name is of patronymic origins derived from personal name Kalemba (locally also denoting a fat, lazy spinster).

== History ==
The village was first mentioned in a Latin document of Diocese of Wrocław called Liber fundationis episcopatus Vratislaviensis from around 1305 as item in Chalambyci sex mansi. It meant that the village was supposed to pay a tithe from 6 smaller lans. The creation of the village was a part of a larger settlement campaign taking place in the late 13th century on the territory of what will be later known as Upper Silesia.

Politically the village belonged initially to the Duchy of Teschen, formed in 1290 in the process of feudal fragmentation of Poland and was ruled by a local branch of Piast dynasty. In 1327 the duchy became a fee of the Kingdom of Bohemia, which after 1526 became part of the Habsburg monarchy.

The village was bought from Marie Gräfin Larisch by Teschener Kammer in 1792 for 16,500 florins.

After Revolutions of 1848 in the Austrian Empire a modern municipal division was introduced in the re-established Austrian Silesia. The village became a part of the Pastwiska municipality.

After World War I, fall of Austria-Hungary, Polish–Czechoslovak War and the division of Cieszyn Silesia in 1920, it became a part of Poland. It was then annexed by Nazi Germany at the beginning of World War II. After the war it was restored to Poland.
