= Mnisztwo =

Coordinates: 49°44′11″N 18°39′47″E

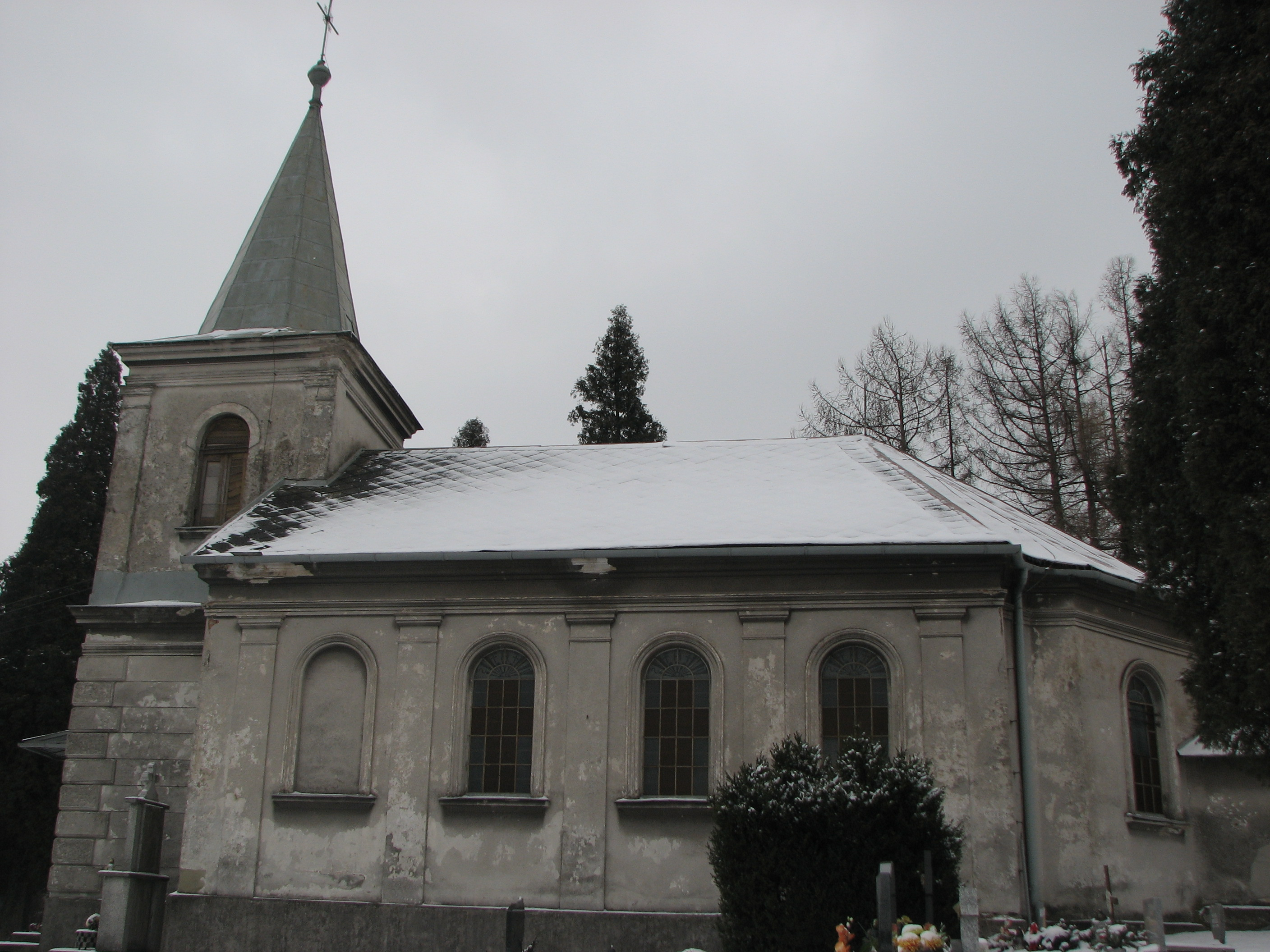
Church of St. John the Baptist's Birth

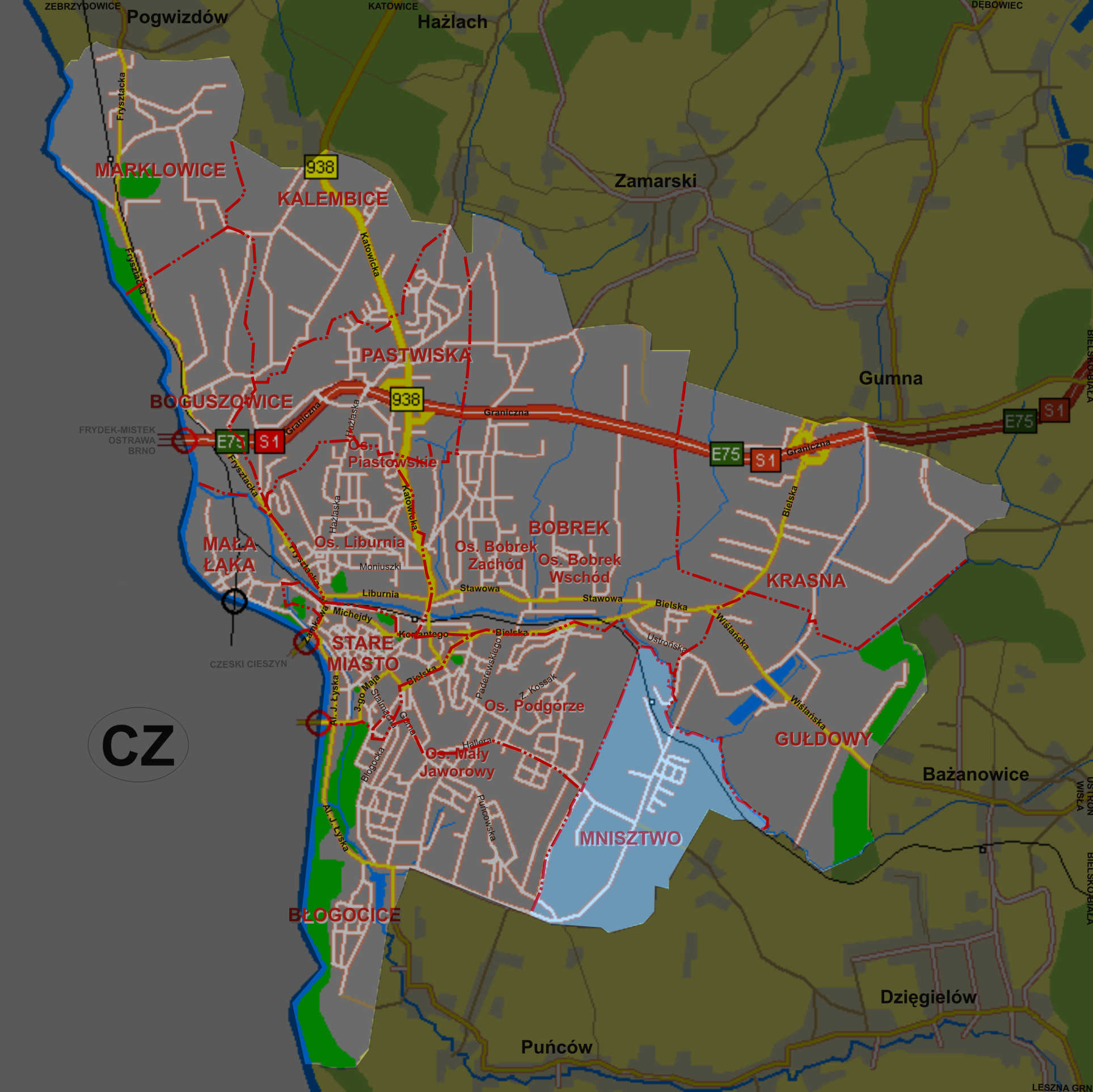
Mnisztwo highlighted on map of Cieszyn

Mnisztwo (previously also Mnichy, German: Mönnichhof) is a district of Cieszyn, Silesian Voivodeship, Poland. It was a separate municipality, but became administratively a part of Cieszyn in 1973.

The name is patronymic in origin derived from monks (Polish and Czech: mnich) or cultural (Mnichy meaning from paper, paperish).

== History ==
The area of the village was originally given to the Dominican Abbey, which was during Reformation (the date is not known) taken from them by Wenceslaus III Adam, Duke of Cieszyn. The village was however first mentioned later in 1577 as na Mnystwie. In 1610 after his switch from Lutheranism to Catholicism Adam Wenceslaus gave a local folwark (called Mnisi; Moenchhof oder folwark slove Mniżsky in 1650) to Cieszyn citizens, and three years later to the reestablished Dominican Abbey. Before 1775 it was parcellated by Habsburgs.

After Revolutions of 1848 in the Austrian Empire a modern municipal division was introduced in the re-established Austrian Silesia. The village as a municipality was subscribed to the political and legal district of Cieszyn. According to the censuses conducted in 1880, 1890, 1900 and 1910 the population of the municipality grew from 260 in 1880 to 422 in 1910 with a majority being native Polish-speakers (between 91.2% and 96.2%) accompanied by a small Czech-speaking minority (at most 20 or 6.3% in 1900) and German-speaking people (at most 10 or 3.4% in 1890). In terms of religion in 1910 the majority were Roman Catholics (58.8%), followed by Protestants (41.2%). The village was also traditionally inhabited by Cieszyn Vlachs, speaking Cieszyn Silesian dialect.

After World War I, fall of Austria-Hungary, Polish–Czechoslovak War and the division of Cieszyn Silesia in 1920, it became a part of Poland. It was then annexed by Nazi Germany at the beginning of World War II. After the war it was restored to Poland.
