= Jakub Skrobanek =

Jakub Skrobanek (born c. 1835 - died 1910) was a merchant, banker and mayor of Cieszyn.

He was owner of tenement on marketplace in Cieszyn. From 1873 until 1894, he was councillor of Cieszyn. From 1875, after resignation of Johann Demel von Elswehr, until 1876 he served as mayor of the city.

On 16 February 1898, he became Honorary Citizen of Cieszyn.

Political offices
| Preceded by Johann Demel von Elswehr | Mayor of Teschen; 1875–1876 | Succeeded by Johann Demel von Elswehr |
