= Cieszyn =

Town in Silesian Voivodeship, Poland

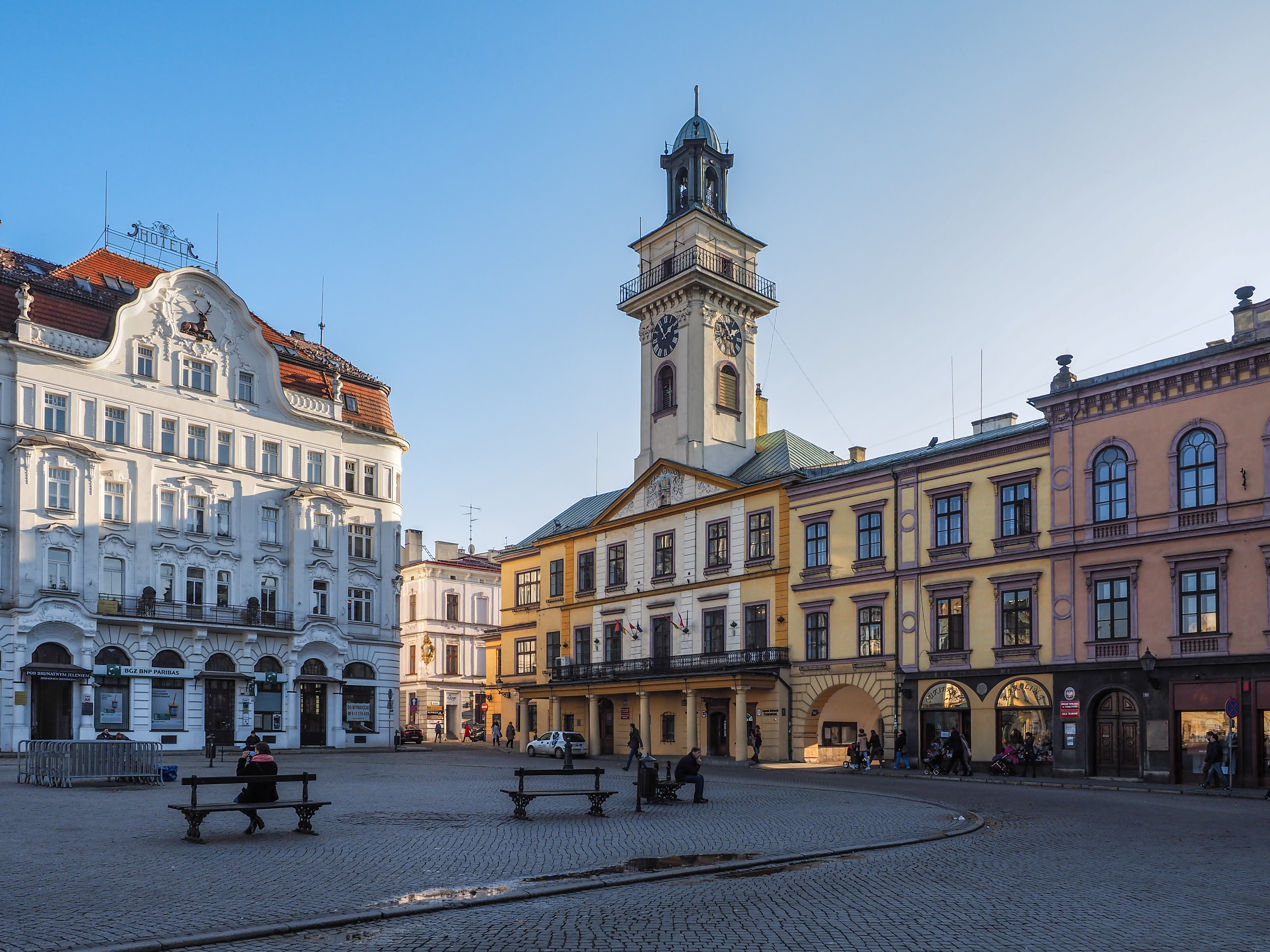
- Cieszyn market square in November 2016

- Flag Coat of arms Brandmark
- Motto: Amore et non dolore (Latin for 'by love and not by pain')
- Location within Silesian Voivodeship Location within Poland
- Coordinates: 49°44′54.37″N 18°37′59.56″E
- Country: Poland
- Voivodeship: Silesian
- County: Cieszyn
- First mentioned: 1155

Government
  - Mayor: Gabriela Staszkiewicz

Area
  - Total: 28.69 km^{2} (11.08 sq mi)
- Elevation: 310 m (1,020 ft)

Population (31 December 2025)
  - Total: 32,217
  - Density: 1,123/km^{2} (2,908/sq mi)
- Time zone: UTC+1 (CET)
  - Summer (DST): UTC+2 (CEST)
- Postal code: 43-400
- Area code: +48 33
- Website: www.cieszyn.pl

Cieszyn (/ˈtʃɛʃɪn/ CHESH-in, Polish: [ˈt͡ɕɛʂɨn]; Czech: Těšín [ˈcɛʃiːn]; German: Teschen [ˈteːʃn̩]) is a border town in southern Poland on the east bank of the Olza River, and the administrative seat of Cieszyn County, Silesian Voivodeship. The town has about 32,000 inhabitants and lies opposite Český Těšín in the Czech Republic. Both towns belong to the historical region of Cieszyn Silesia, and formerly constituted the capital of the Duchy of Cieszyn as a single town.

== Geography ==
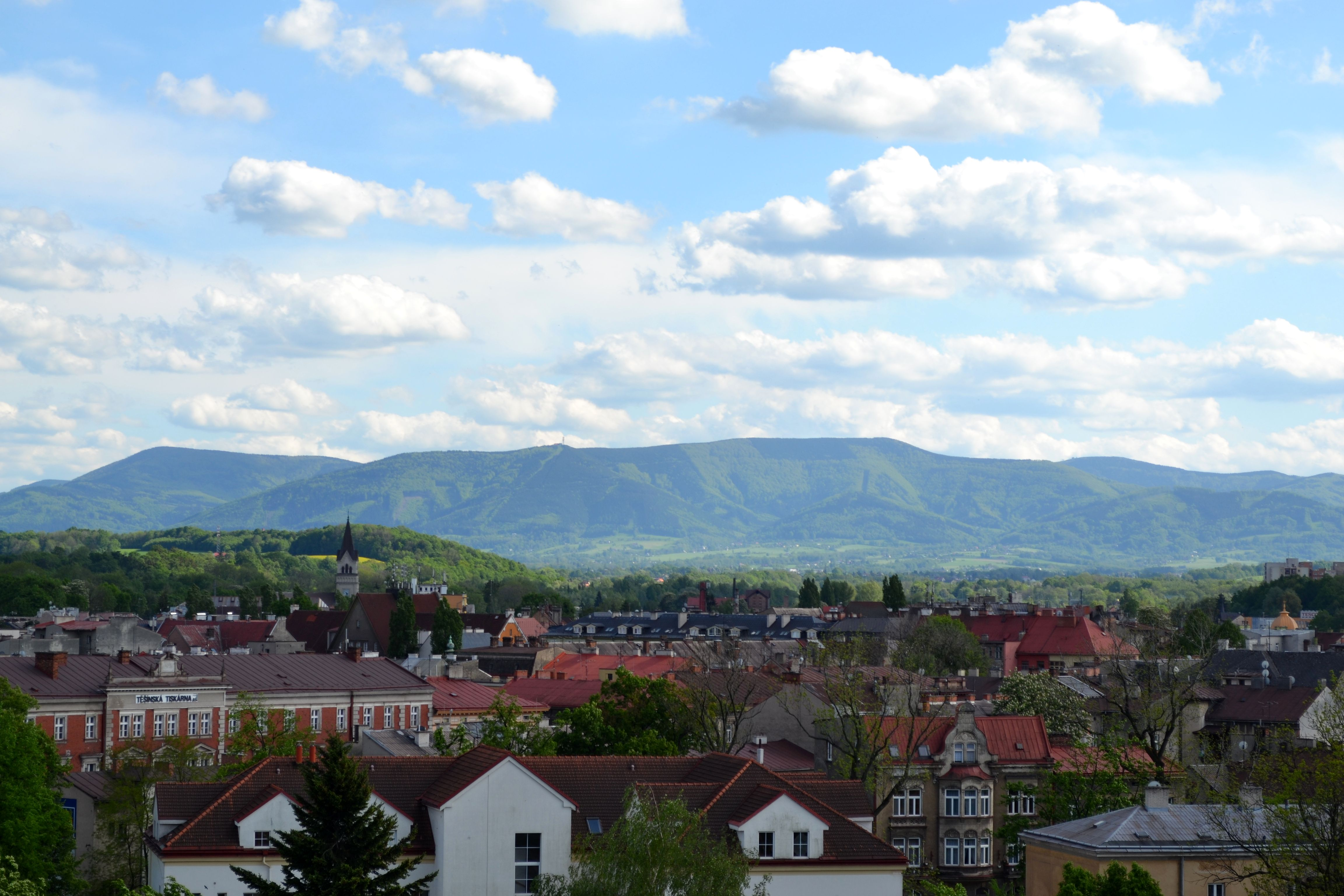
Panorama of Cieszyn

The town is situated on the Olza river, a tributary of the Oder River, which forms the border with the Czech Republic. It is located within the western Silesian Foothills north of the Silesian Beskids and Mt. Czantoria Wielka, a popular ski resort. Cieszyn is the heart of the historical region of Cieszyn Silesia, the southeasternmost part of Upper Silesia. Until the end of World War I in 1918 it was a seat of the Dukes of Cieszyn.

In 1920 Cieszyn Silesia was divided between the two newly created states of Poland and Czechoslovakia, with the smaller western suburbs of Cieszyn becoming part of Czechoslovakia as a new town called Český Těšín. The larger part of the town joined Poland as Cieszyn. Three bridges connect the twin towns. After Poland and the Czech Republic joined the European Union and its passport-free Schengen zone, border controls were abolished and residents of both the Polish and Czech part could move freely across the border. The combined population of Polish and Czech parts of the city is 61,201 inhabitants. Cieszyn is the southern terminus of the Polish National road 1 leading to Gdańsk on the Baltic coast.

The town combines both Polish and Old–Austrian peculiarities in the style of its buildings. Because of several major fires and subsequent reconstructions (the last one in the late 18th century), the picturesque old town is sometimes called Little Vienna. The only relic of the ancient castle is a square tower, dating from the 14th century and 11th century romanesque chapel.

== History ==
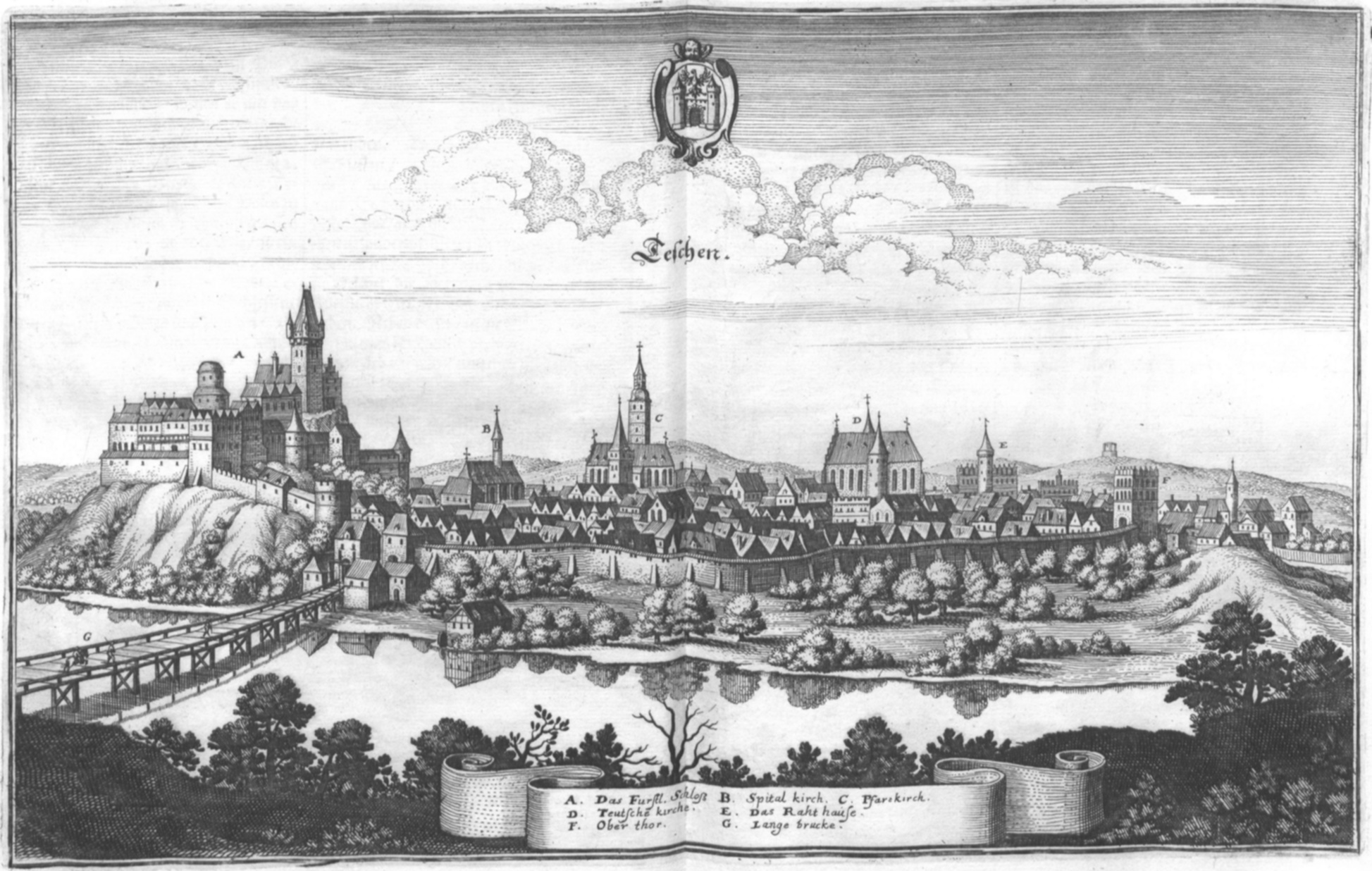
Copper engraving by Matthäus Merian from c. 1640 depicting the town

The area has been populated by West Slavic peoples since at least the 7th century. According to legend, in 810 three sons of a prince – Bolko, Leszko and Cieszko, met here after a long pilgrimage, found a spring, and decided to found a new settlement. They called it Cieszyn, from the words cieszym się ("We're happy"). This well can be found at ulica Trzech Braci ("Three Brothers Street"), just west of the town square.

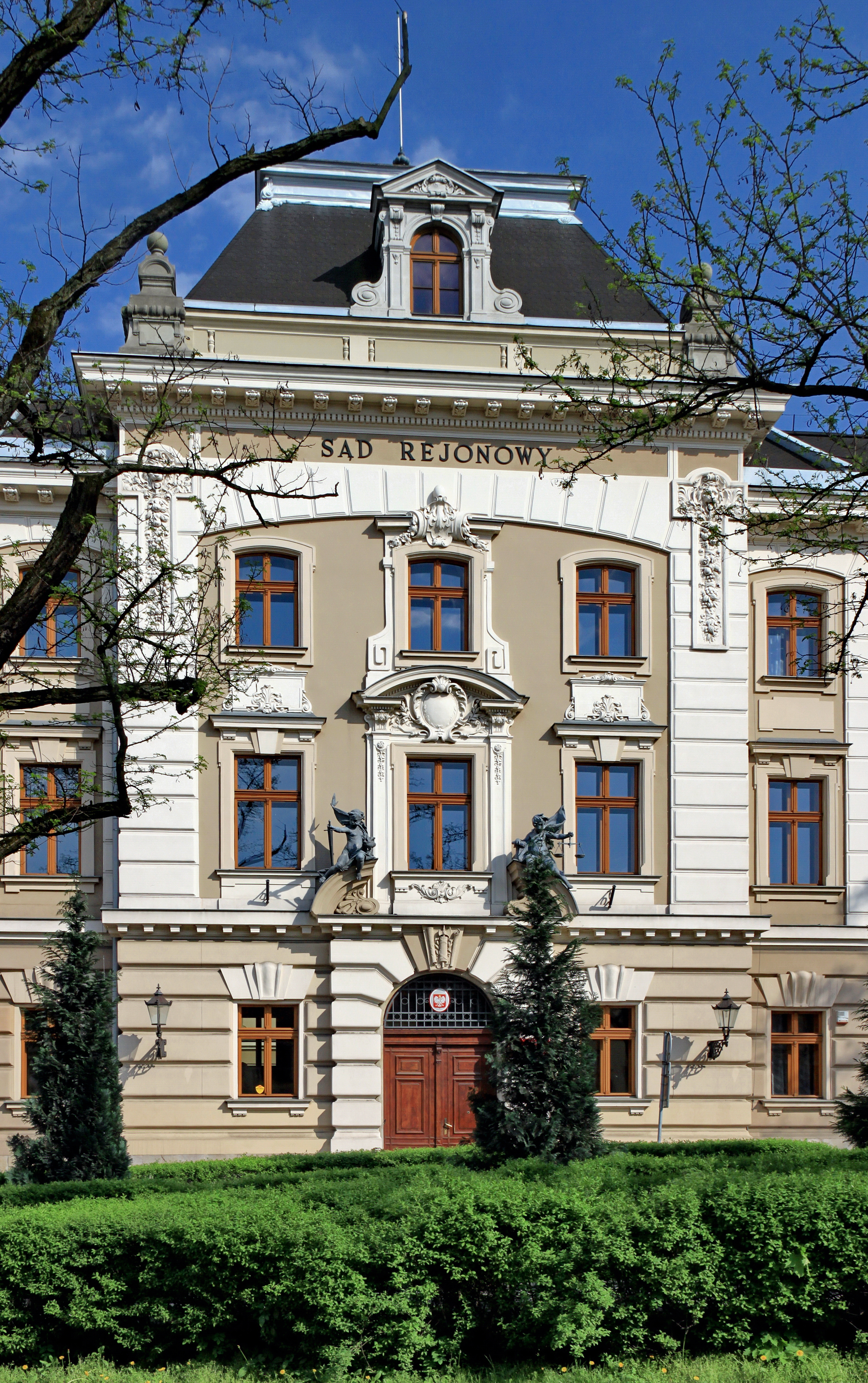
The District Court of Cieszyn built in 1905, an example of the town's long prosperous history and its impact on architecture

The area became part of the emerging Polish state in the 10th century. The town was the capital of the Duchy of Cieszyn, established during the fragmentation of Poland into smaller duchies, since 1290, which was ruled by Piast dynasty until 1653 and by the Habsburg Dynasty of Austria until 1918. It was in Teschen that Maria Theresa and Frederick II in May 1779 signed the Teschen Peace Treaty, which put an end to the War of the Bavarian Succession. In the 19th century Teschen was known for its ethnic, religious and cultural diversity, containing mostly German, Polish, Jewish and Czech communities. There was also a small Vlach community and a Hungarian community in the town consisting mostly of officers and clerks.

The town was divided in July 1920 by the Spa Conference, leaving a Polish minority on the Czechoslovak side. Its smaller western suburbs became what is now the town of Český Těšín in the Czech Republic. During the interwar period two villages were merged into Cieszyn: Błogocice in 1923 and Bobrek in 1932. After 1920 many ethnic Germans left the town, while many Poles from the Czechoslovak part of the region moved in. According to the Polish census of 1921, Cieszyn had 15,268 inhabitants, of whom 9,241 (60.5%) were Poles, 4,777 (31.2%) were Germans, 1014 (6.6%) were Jews, and 195 (1.3%) were Czechs. The census from 1931 indicated 14,707 inhabitants, of whom 12,145 (82.7%) were Poles, while the rest consisted mostly of Germans and Jews (in 1937 estimated to be 12 and 8% respectively).

Cieszyn and Český Těšín were merged again in October 1938 when Poland annexed the Trans-Olza area together with Český Těšín. Following the joint German-Soviet invasion of Poland, which started World War II in September 1939, Cieszyn was occupied by Germany until 1945. In 1939–1940, the Germans carried out mass arrests of local Poles during the genocidal Intelligenzaktion campaign, and then imprisoned them in a newly established Nazi prison in the town. Many Polish teachers, school principals, priests and activists were deported to concentration camps and murdered there. The Nazi prison had two forced labour subcamps in the town, and two more in nearby Karviná and Konská. The Germans also established a camp for children up to the age of 2-3, where they were beaten, tortured and subjected to medical experiments. Almost the entire Jewish community was murdered by the Nazis.

After World War II, the border between Poland and Czechoslovakia was restored to that of 1920. Most Germans fled or were expelled and were replaced with Poles expelled from the Polish areas annexed by the Soviet Union. Signs of the former German presence in the town were removed by a special committee.

On 19 July 1970, five firefighters from Cieszyn died when a bridge they were on fell into the Olza River, due to heavy flooding. In 1977, Boguszowice, Gułdowy, Kalembice, Krasna, Mnisztwo, Pastwiska were amalgamated with Cieszyn and Marklowice.

== Culture ==
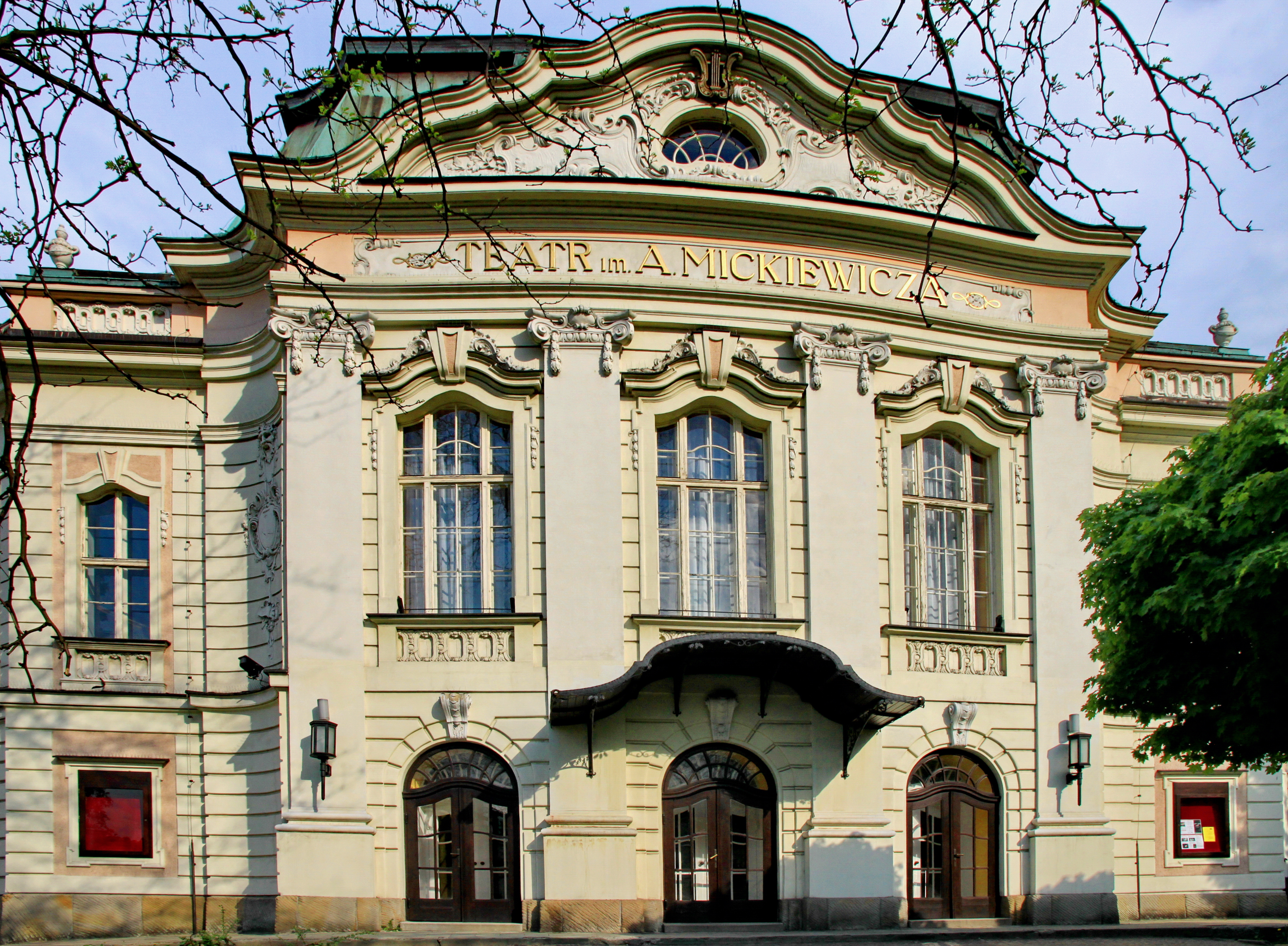
Adam Mickiewicz Theatre in Cieszyn

Since the 18th century Cieszyn Silesia has been an important centre of Polish Protestantism when the Jesus Church was built as the only one in Upper Silesia. Currently, Cieszyn is also the site of the Cieszyn Summer Film Festival, one of the most influential film festivals in Poland. There is also an earlier established Czech-Polish-Slovak film festival.

== Industry ==
Cieszyn is an important centre of the electromechanical industry. It is also the site of the Olza Cieszyn sweets factory (where the famous Prince Polo wafers are made) and the Brackie Browar, where Żywiec Porter is brewed. The main source of income for many citizens is trade with the nearby Czech Republic and retail trade associated with transit across the two bridges over the Olza to Český Těšín. In the past, the city was home to many furniture factories.

== Sites of interest ==
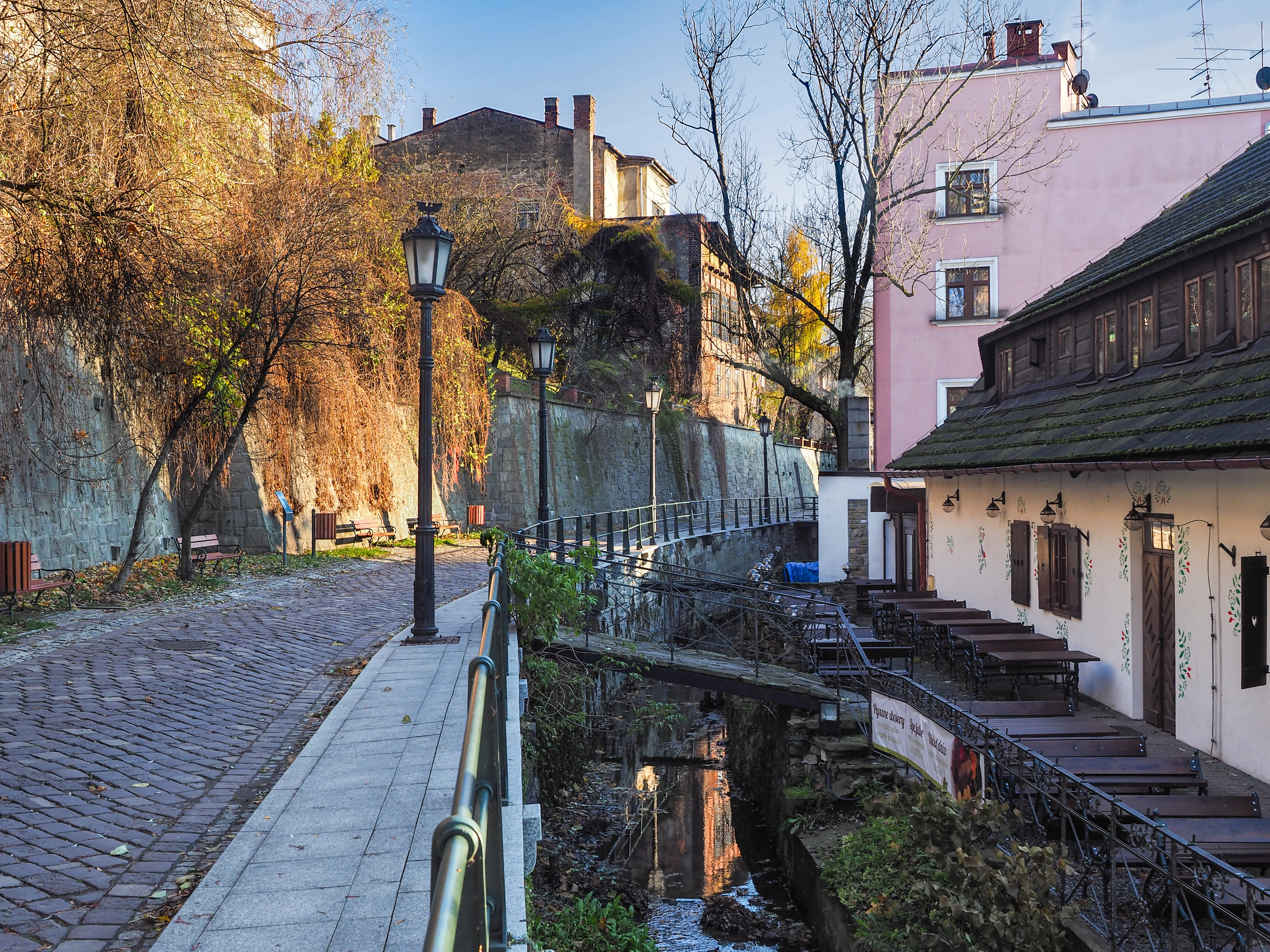
Przykopa Street, which has maintained its 18th and 19th-century appearance

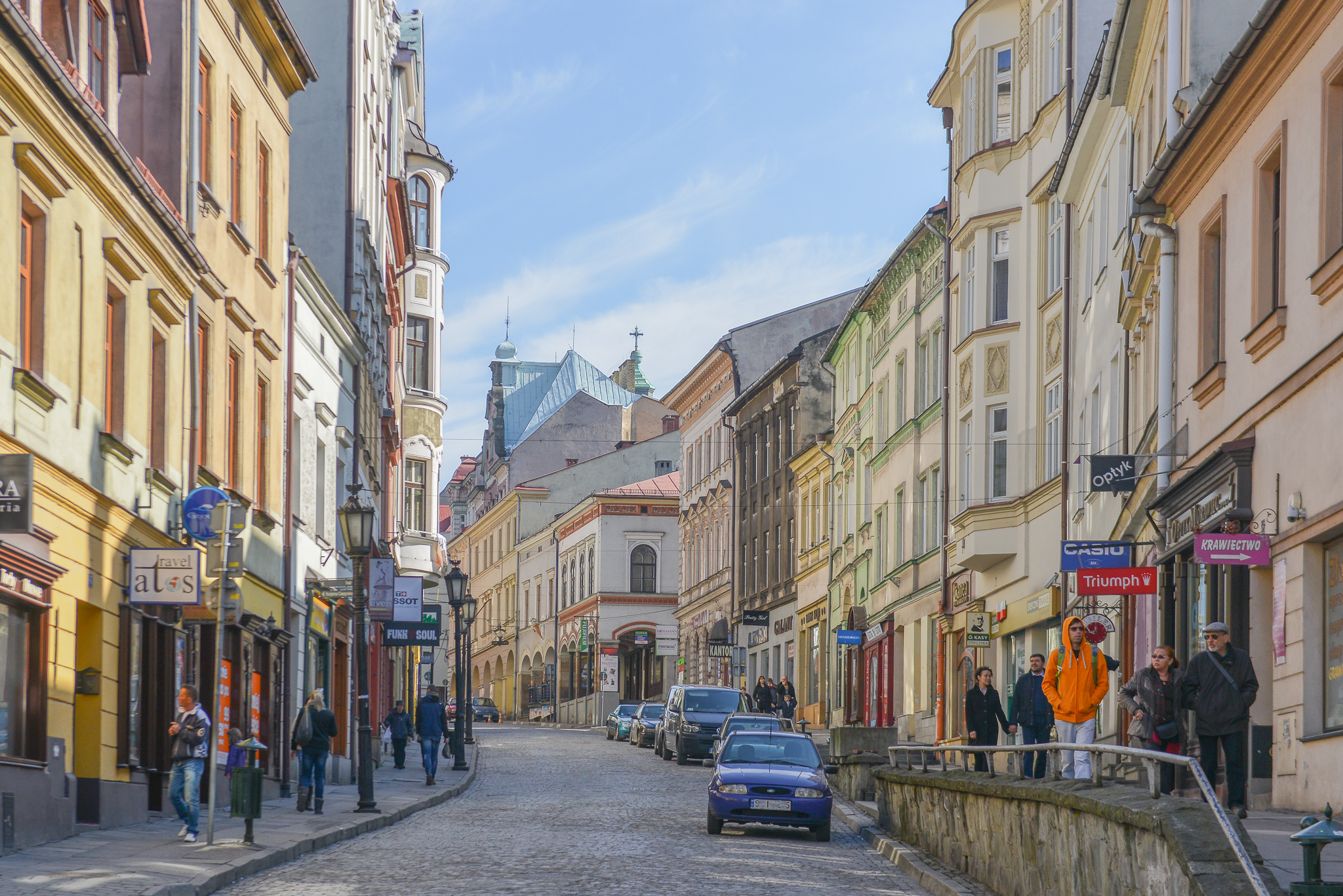
Głęboka Street, one of the main promenades in Cieszyn

- Romanesque St. Nicholas' Chapel (Kaplica św. Mikołaja, a rotunda from the 11th century), depicted on the current 20 złotych note.
- Remnants of the Piast dynasty castle
  - Piast Castle Tower (Wieża Piastowska, mostly 14th century)
  - Gothic St. Mary Magdalene Church (Kościół Marii Magdaleny, 13th century), burial site of the Cieszyn line of the Piast dynasty
- Old Town Square (Rynek)
  - bourgeoisie houses (15th–19th centuries)
  - Town Hall (Ratusz, early 19th century)
- Former minting house (18th century)
- Lutheran Church of Jesus (18th century)
- Museum of Cieszyn Silesia in the former Larisch family palace (Pałac Laryszów, Muzeum Śląska Cieszyńskiego, the first museum in Poland)
- Castle Brewery (Browar Zamkowy, 1846)
- Habsburg Palace in Cieszyn
- Bonifraters Monastery (18th century)
- The protestant Church of Jesus (Kościół Jezusowy), with a baroque tower and statues of the Four Evangelists above the altar that liven up the plain interior.
- Holy Cross Church

== Notable people ==
- Jiří Třanovský (1592–1637), theologian and composer
- Adam Christian Agricola (1593–1645), evangelical preacher
- Carl Friedrich Kotschy (1789–1856), botanist and theologian
- Jakub Skrobanek (c. 1835–1910), merchant, banker and mayor of Cieszyn
- Alfons Matter (1853-1947), entrepreneur, builder, social activist
- Andrzej Grodyński (1861-1925), lawyer, Silesian appeal court judge, Polish activist and delegate to Czech border talks (1920-21)
- Rudolf Ramek (1881–1941), Austrian politician, Chancellor of Austria
- Hermann Heller (1891–1933), jurist
- Viktor Ullmann (1898–1944), Jewish musician
- Stanisław Grodyński (1898-1971), soldier, officer, lawyer, multiple starost appointments during inter-war years, served in Polish Command at Monte Cassino (1944)
- Max Rostal (1905–1991), violinist and educator
- Herbert Czaja (1914–1997), German politician
- Richard Pipes (1923–2018), Polish-American historian
- Karol Semik (born 1953), teacher and educator
- Magdalena Gwizdoń (born 1979), biathlete
- Kajetan Kajetanowicz (born 1979), rally driver
- Ireneusz Jeleń (born 1981), footballer
- Tomisław Tajner (born 1983), ski jumper
- Jan Błachowicz (born 1983), mixed martial artist
- Piotr Żyła (born 1987), ski jumper
- Kacper Sztuka (born 2006), racing driver

== Twin towns – sister cities ==
Cieszyn is twinned with:

- Balchik, Bulgaria
- Cambrai, France
- Český Těšín, Czech Republic
- Genk, Belgium
- Puck, Poland
- Rožňava, Slovakia
- Teuva, Finland

== Gallery ==
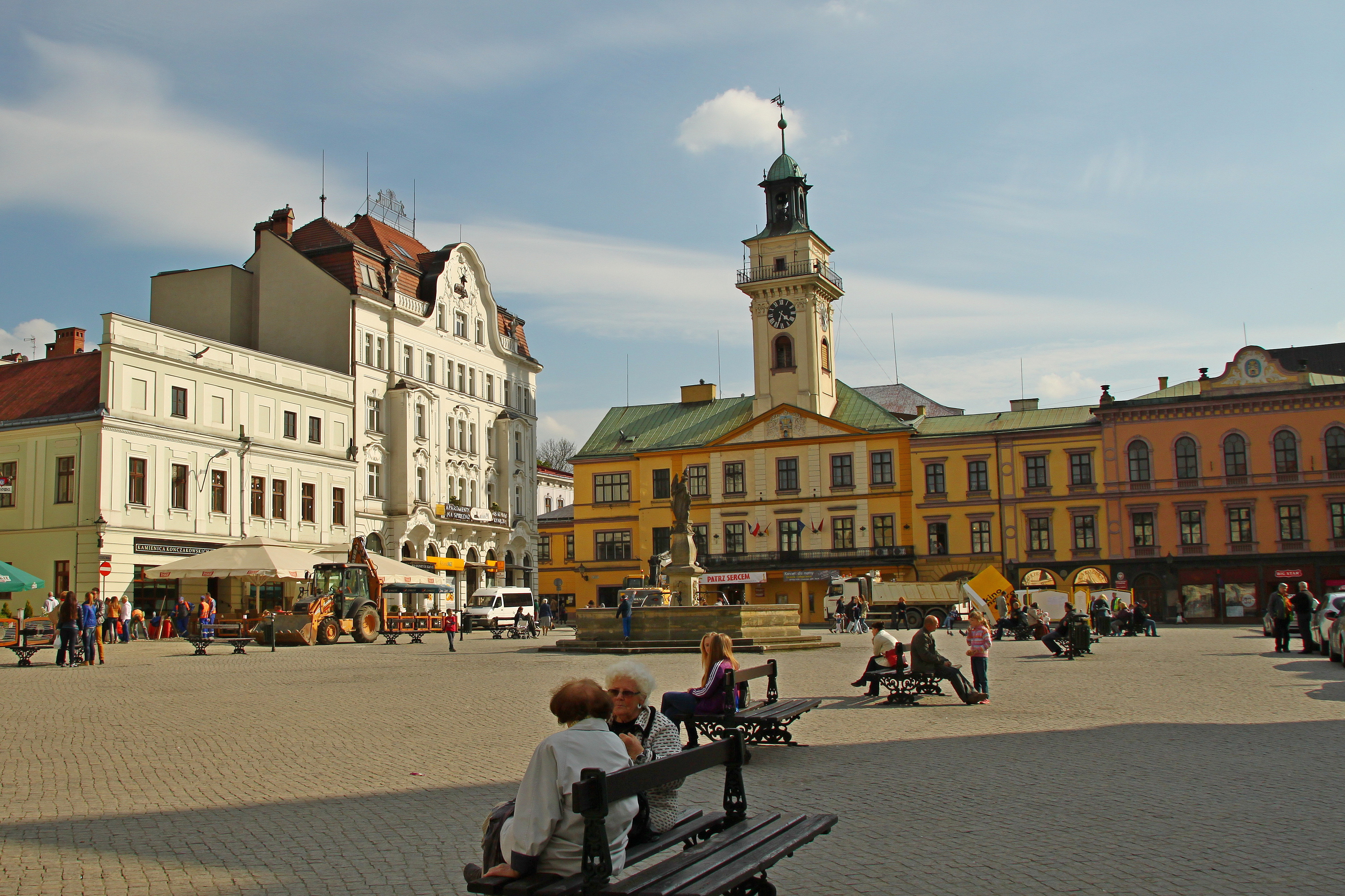
Town Hall at the Cieszyn Market Square

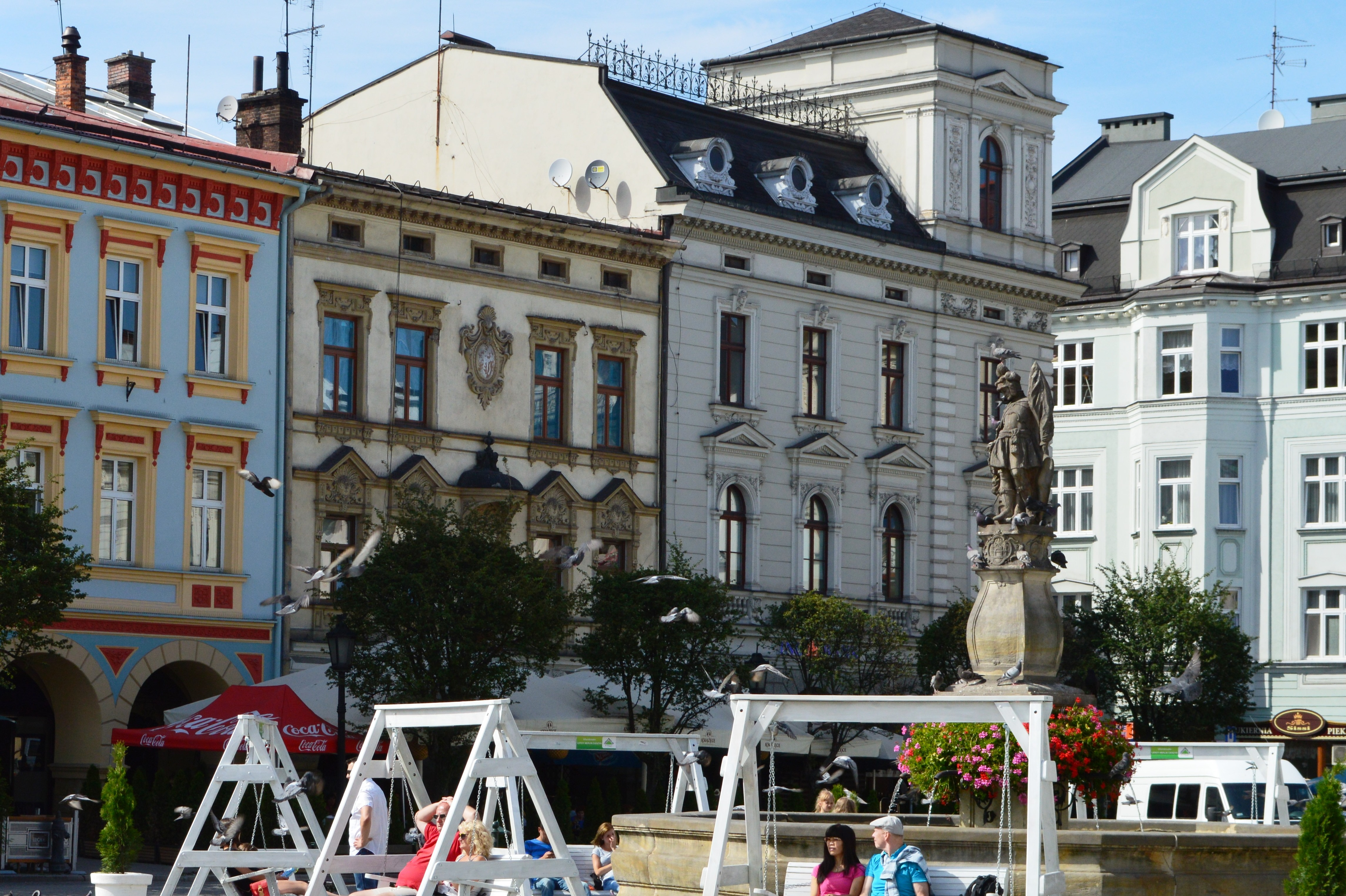
Townhouses in Cieszyn

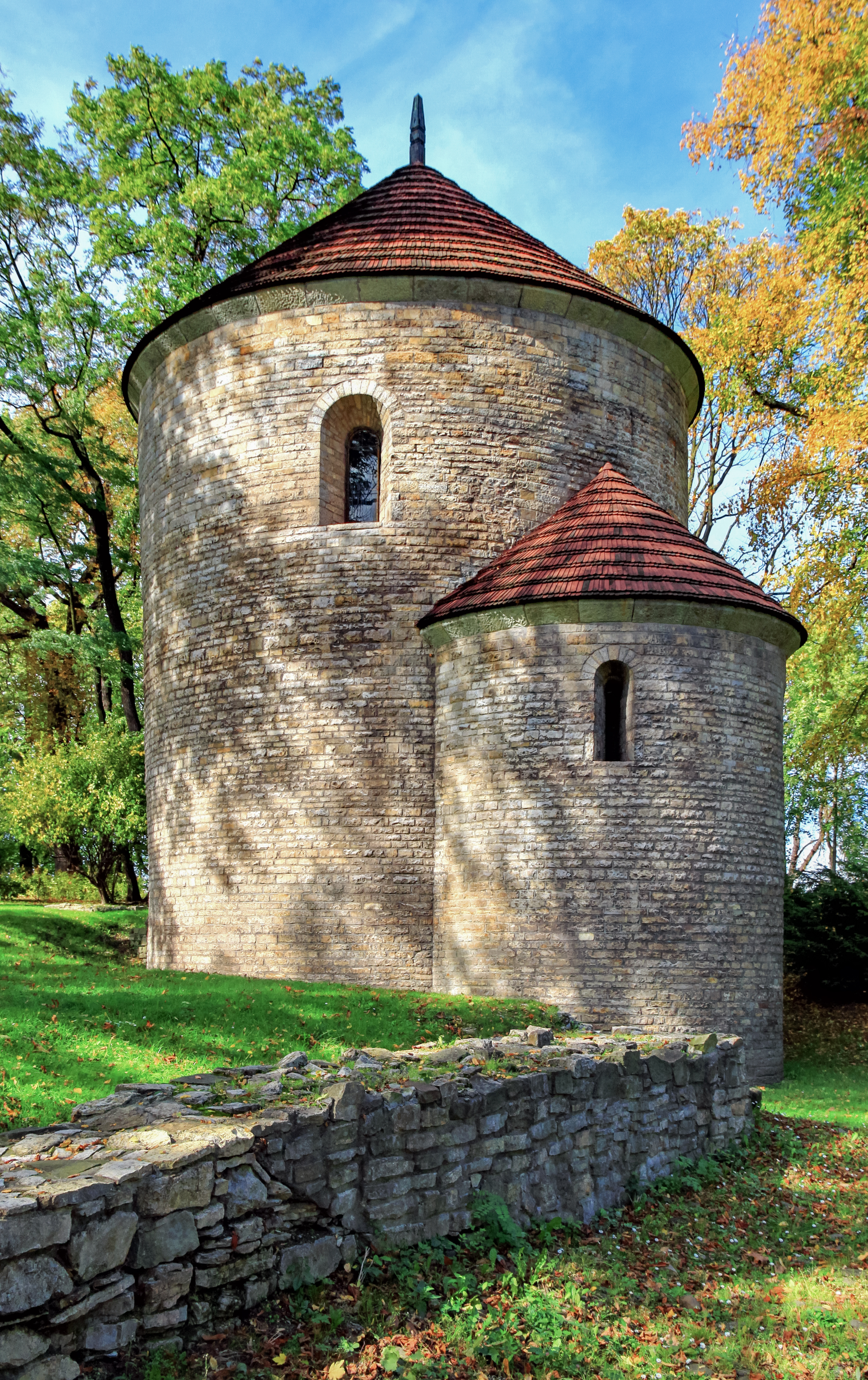
Rotunda from circa 1180 / St. Nicholas Church

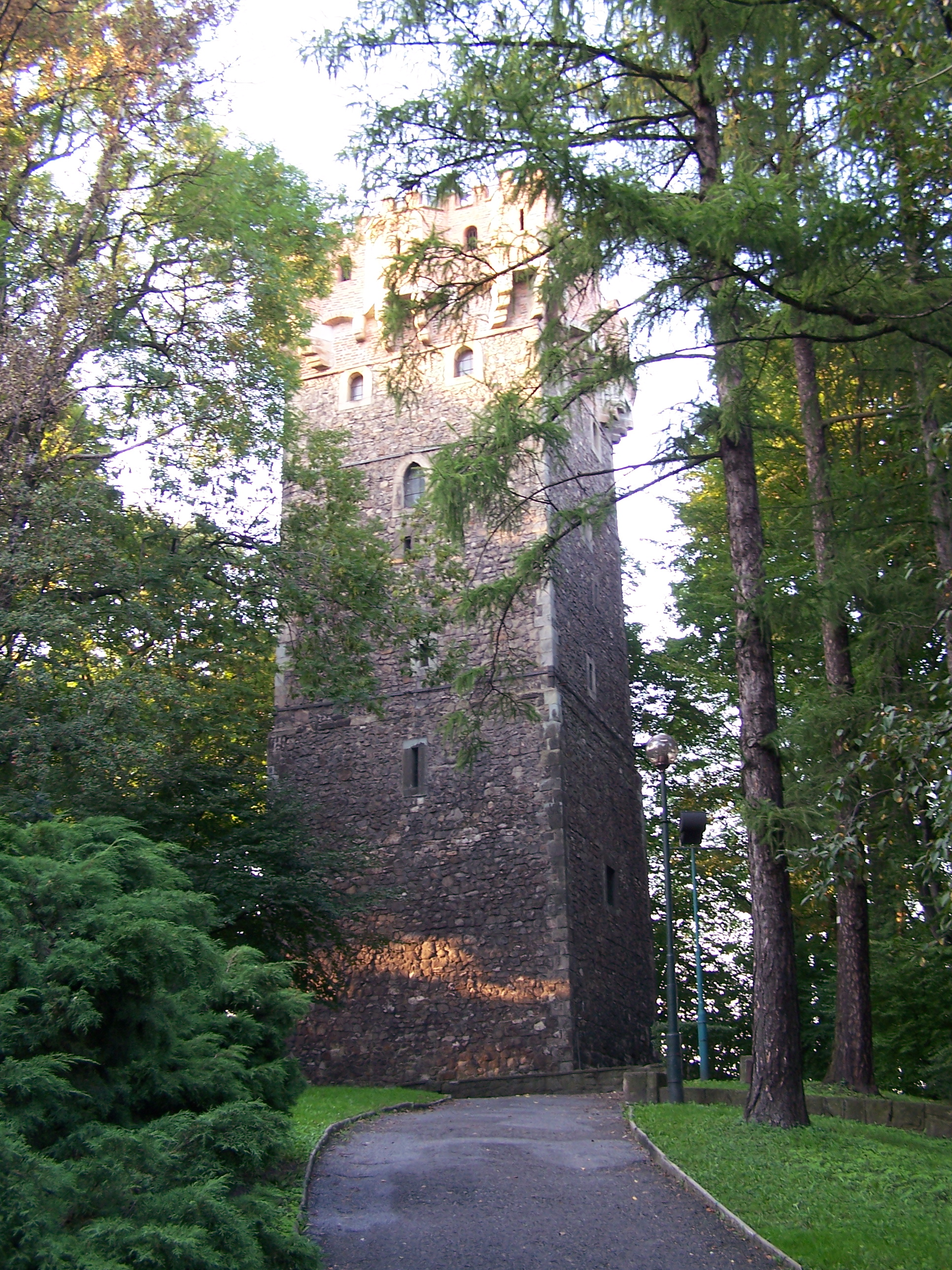
14th century Piast tower

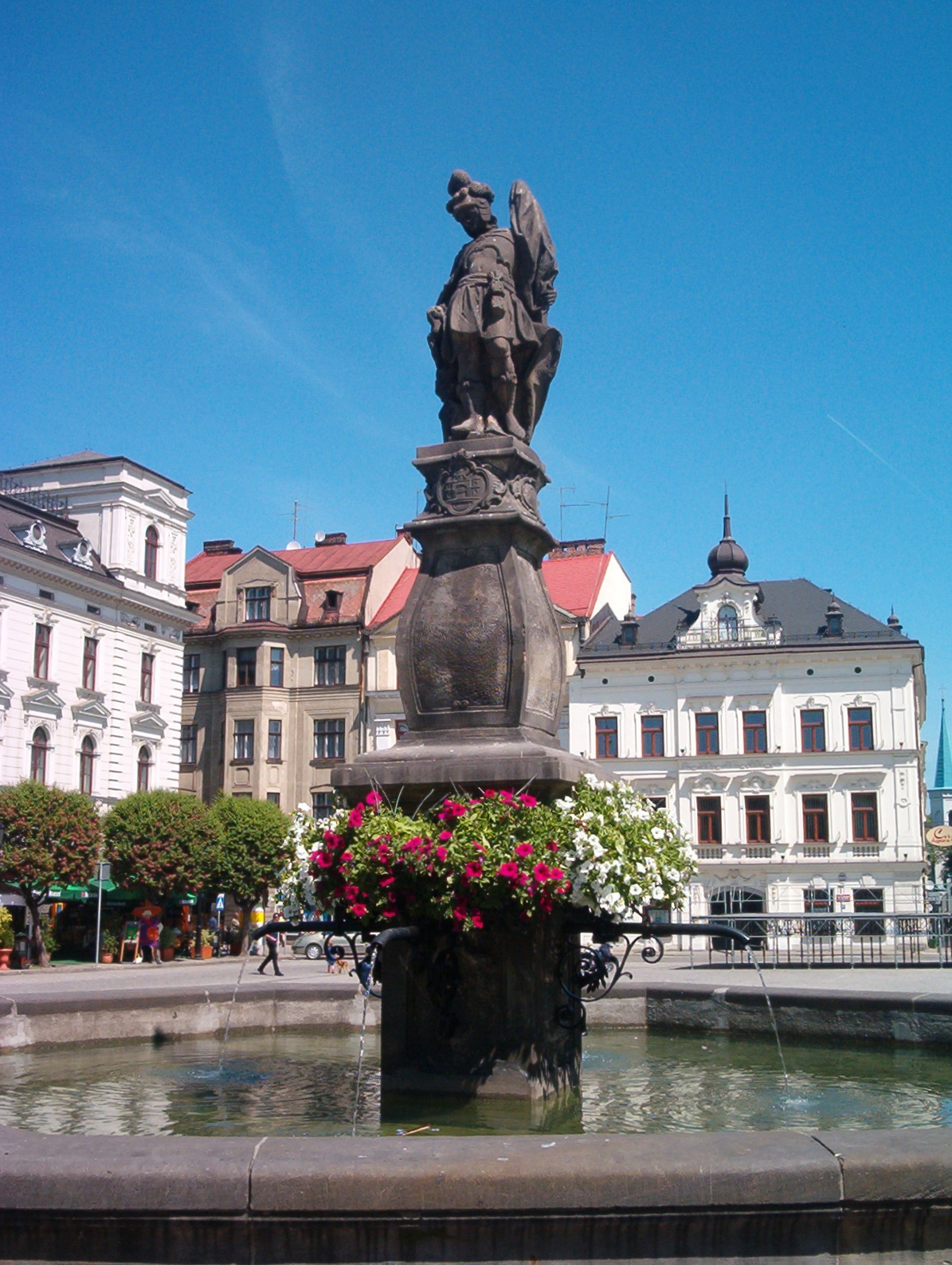
Statue of Saint Florian

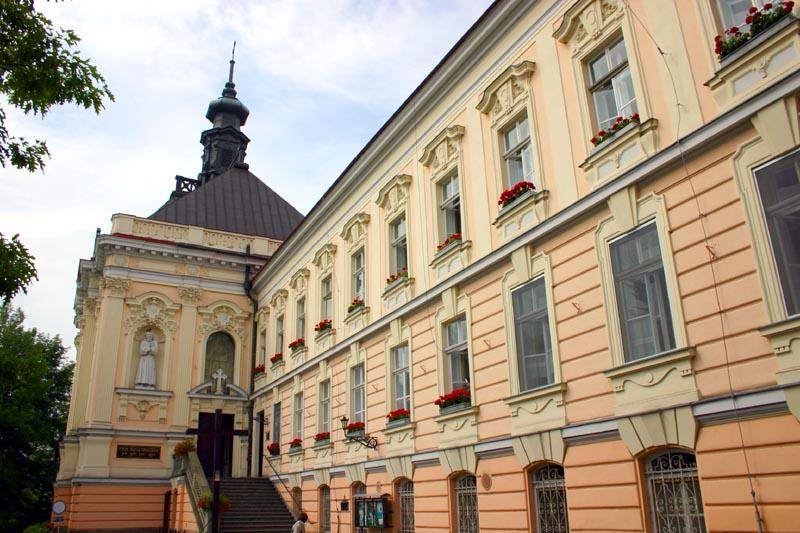
Monastery, church, and hospital of the Sisters of Saint Elizabeth

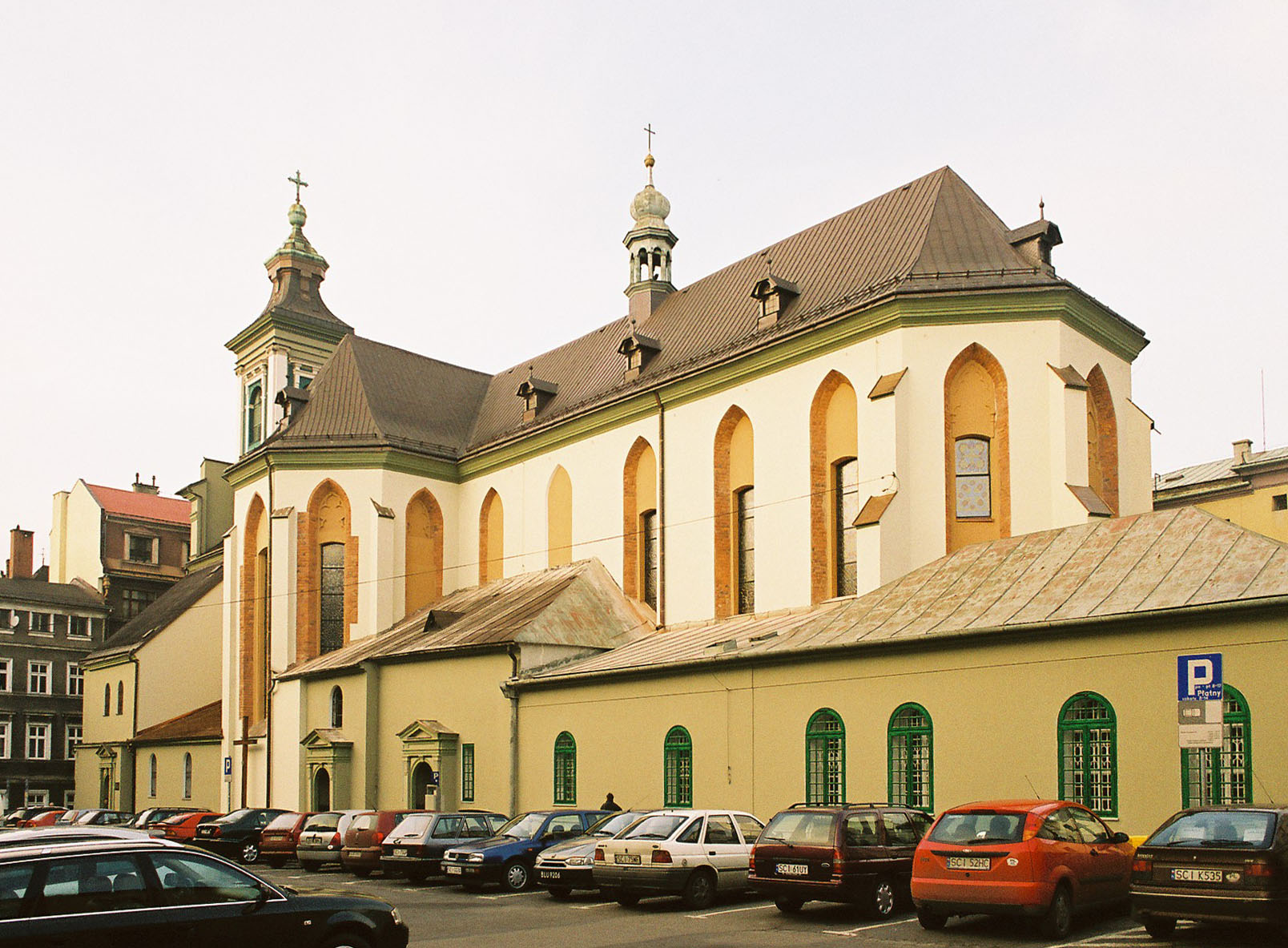
Mary Magdalene Dominican Church, begun in late 13th century

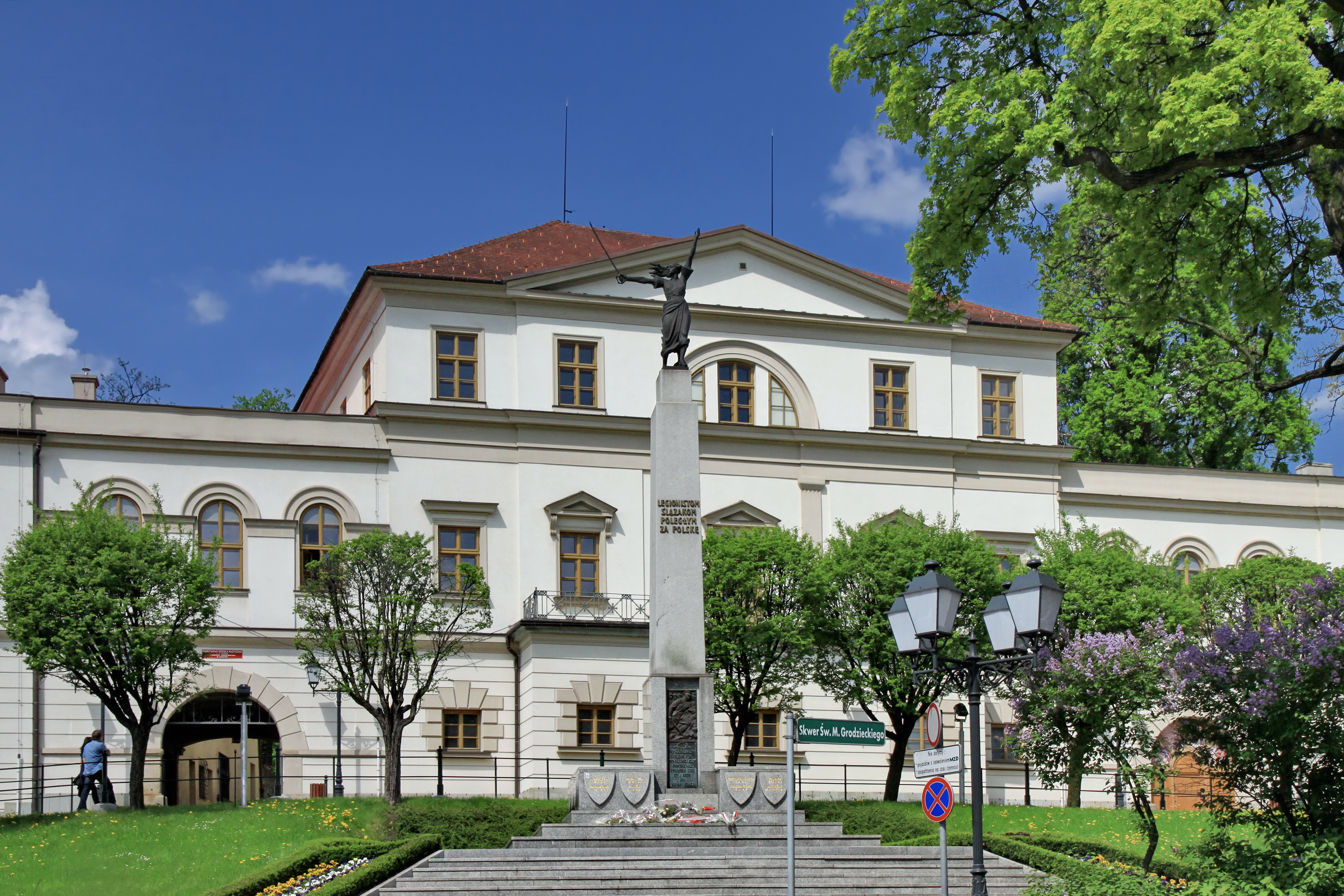
Hunting Palace of the Habsburgs and monument commemorating Silesian legionnaries fallen for Poland

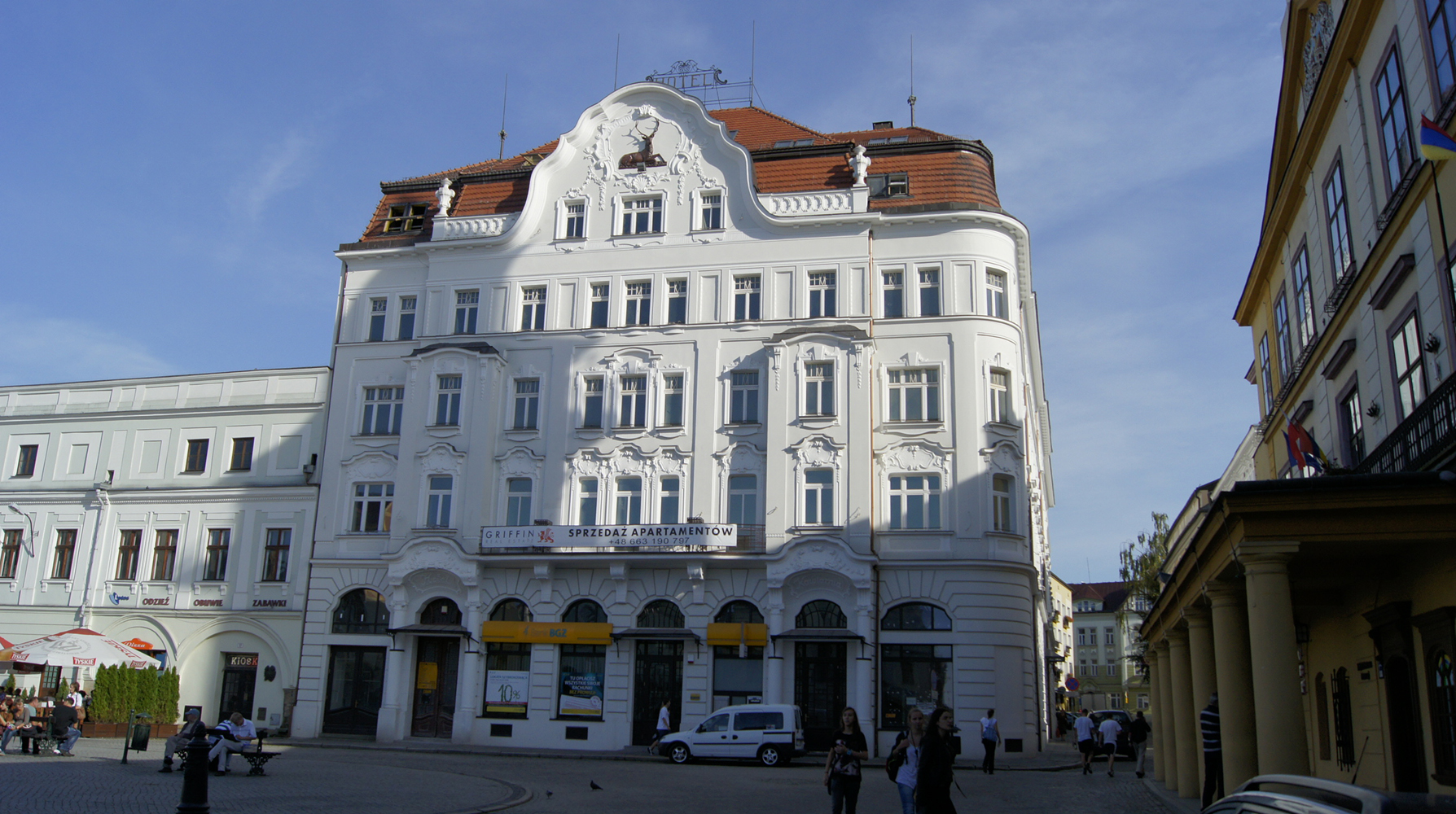
Hotel on the town square

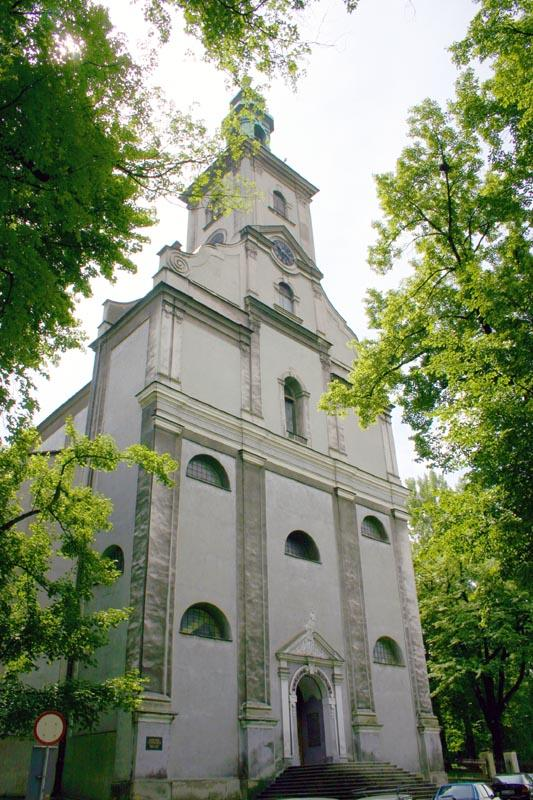
Evangelical Protestant Church of Jesus, begun in 1710

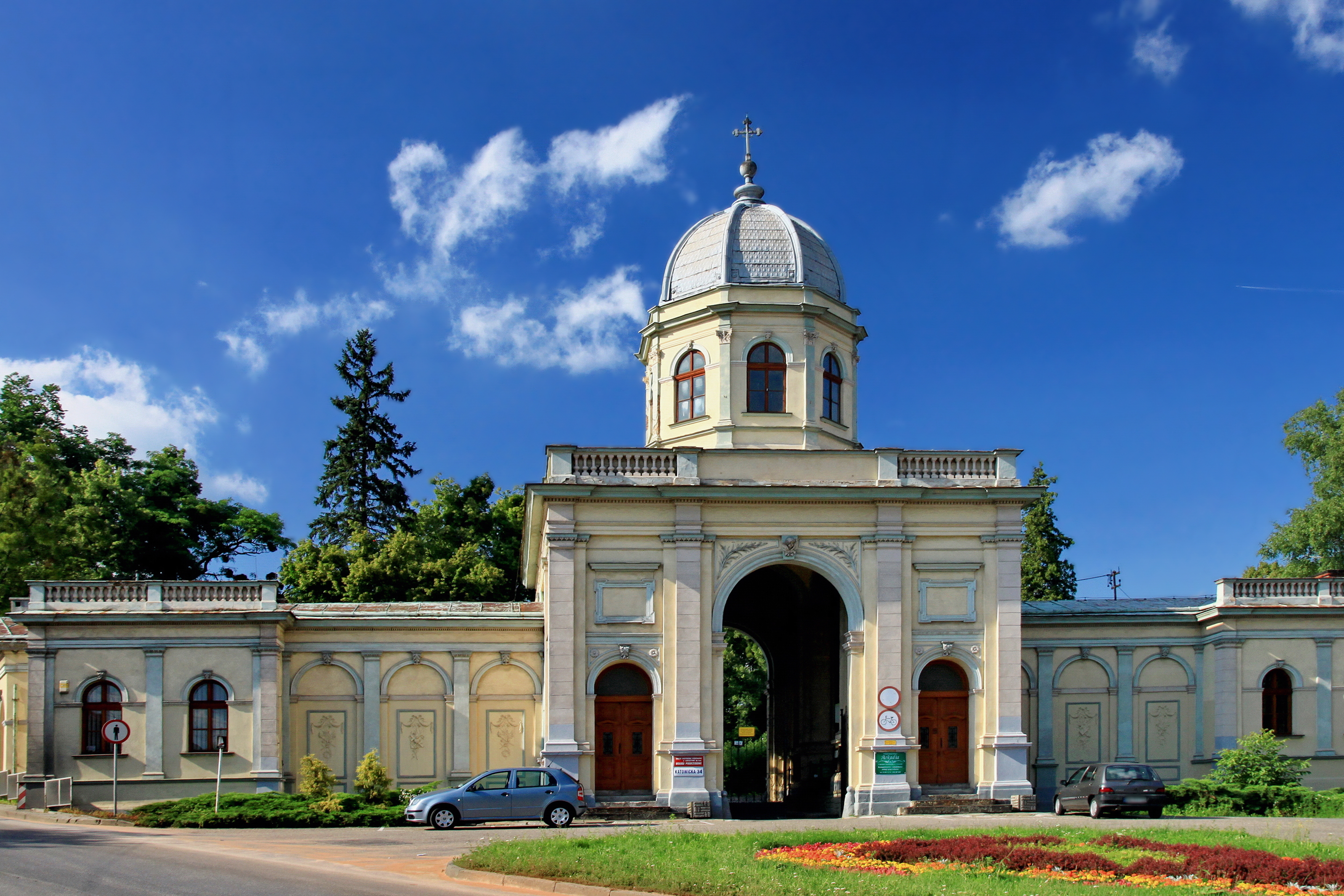
Communal Cemetery in Cieszyn

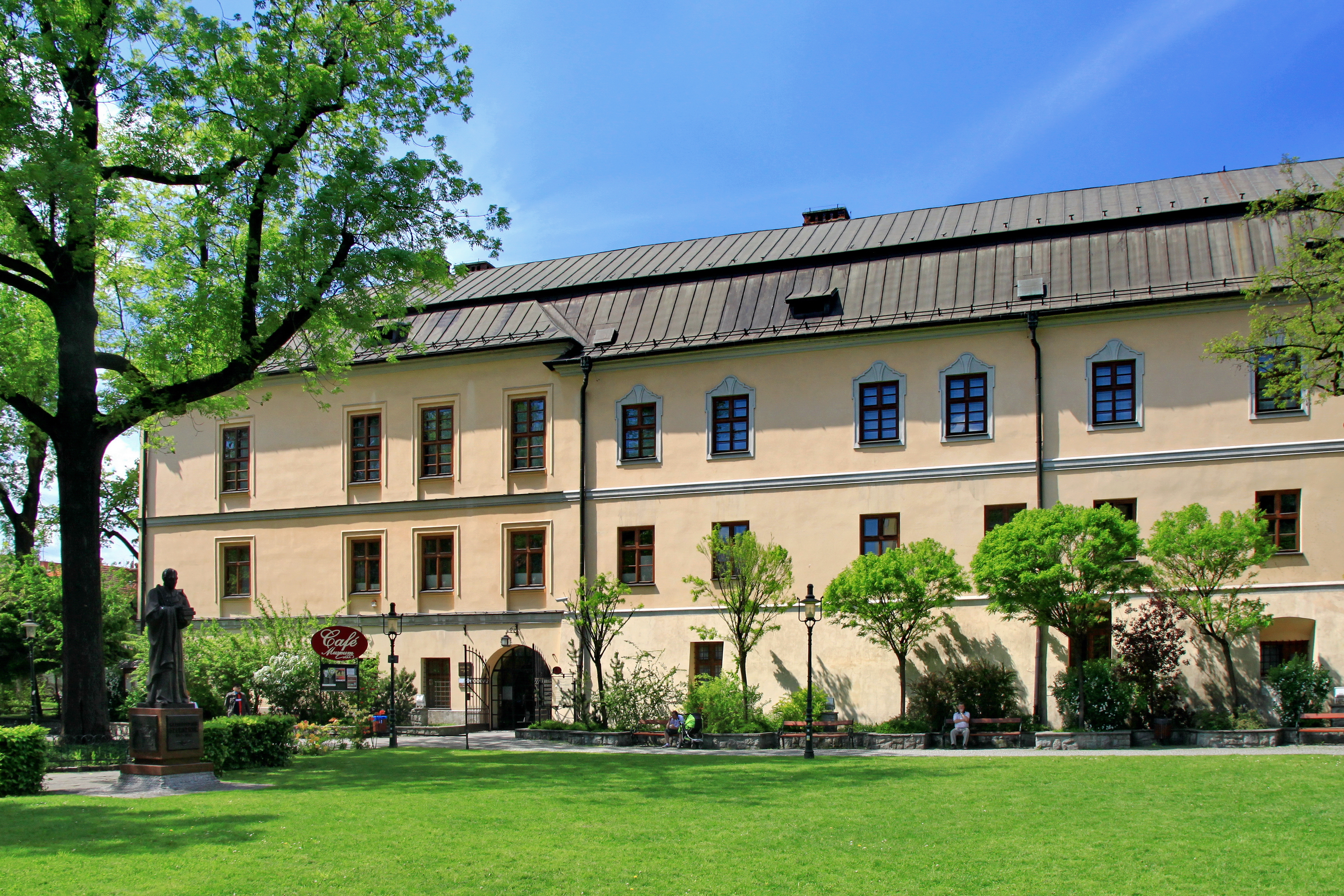
Museum of the Cieszyn Silesia
