= Marklowice, Cieszyn =

District of Cieszyn

Coordinates: 49°47′5.9″N 18°36′16.9″E

Marklowice
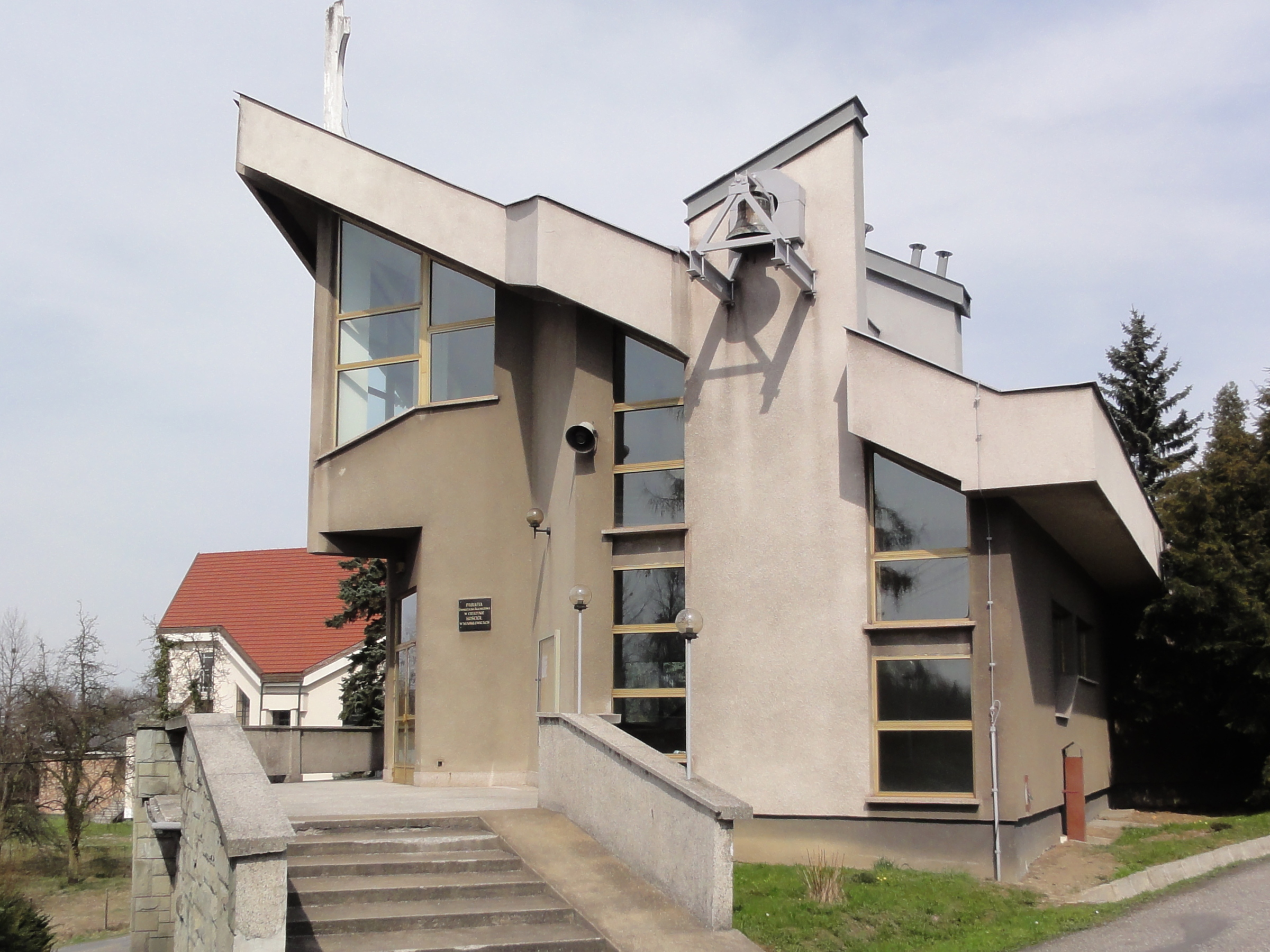
- The Evangelical church in the district

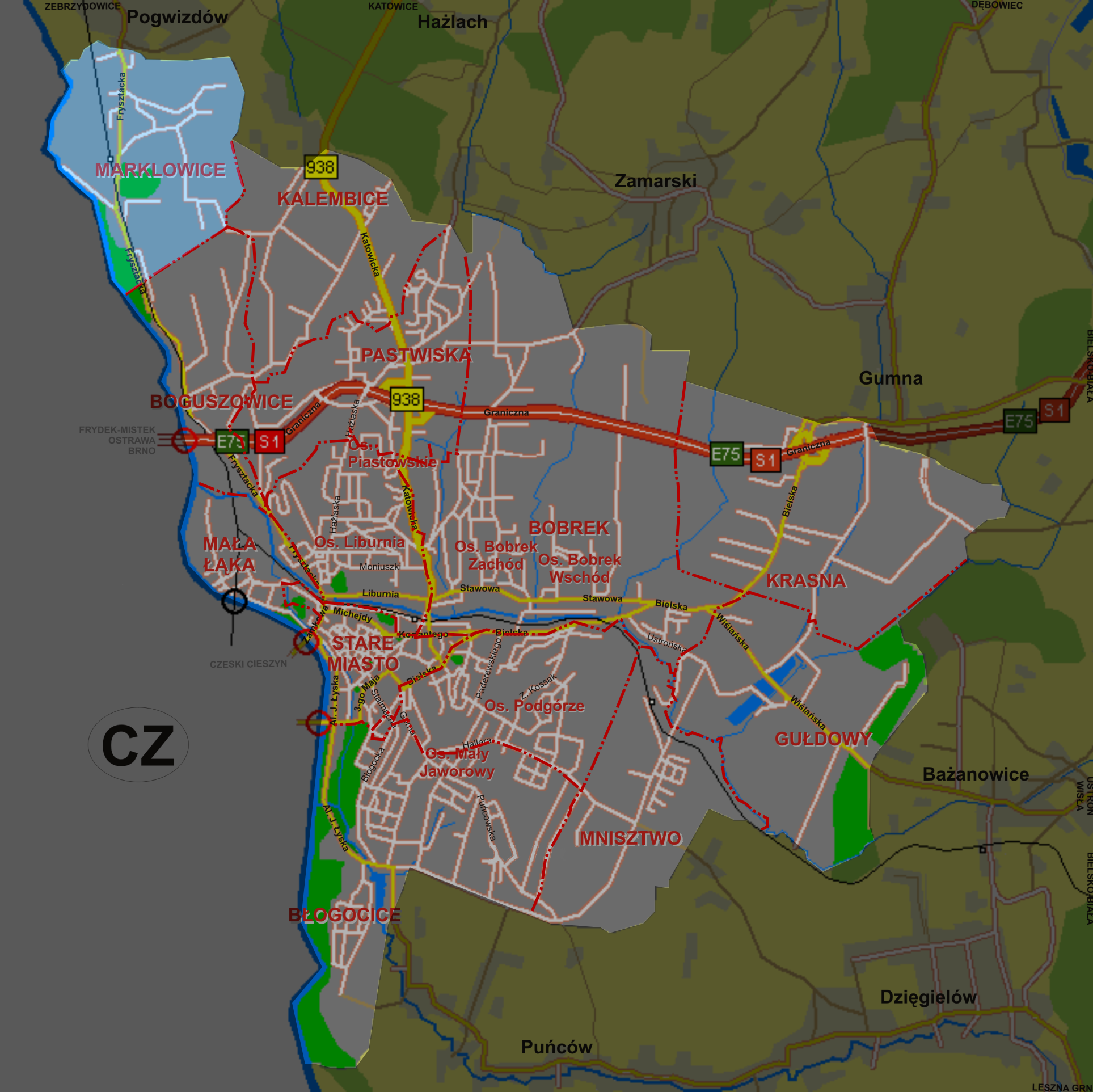
- Marklowice highlighted in blue on map of Cieszyn
- Country: Poland
- Voivodeship: Silesian
- County: Cieszyn
- Town: Cieszyn

Marklowice is a district of Cieszyn, Silesian Voivodeship, Poland. It was a separate municipality, but became administratively a part of Cieszyn in 1977.

== History ==
The village was first mentioned in 1523 as Marklowicze. Politically the village belonged then to the Duchy of Teschen, a fee of the Kingdom of Bohemia, which after 1526 became part of the Habsburg monarchy.

After World War I, fall of Austria-Hungary, Polish–Czechoslovak War and the division of Cieszyn Silesia in 1920, it became a part of Poland. It was then annexed by Nazi Germany at the beginning of World War II. After the war it was restored to Poland.

From 1960 to 1965 the Polifarb factory was built here, what contributed to the merger of the village with Cieszyn in 1977. So far it was the last separate municipality to merge with the town.
