= Habsburg Palace, Cieszyn =

Classicist palace in Cieszyn, Poland

Coordinates: 49°45′2.2″N 18°37′38.35″E

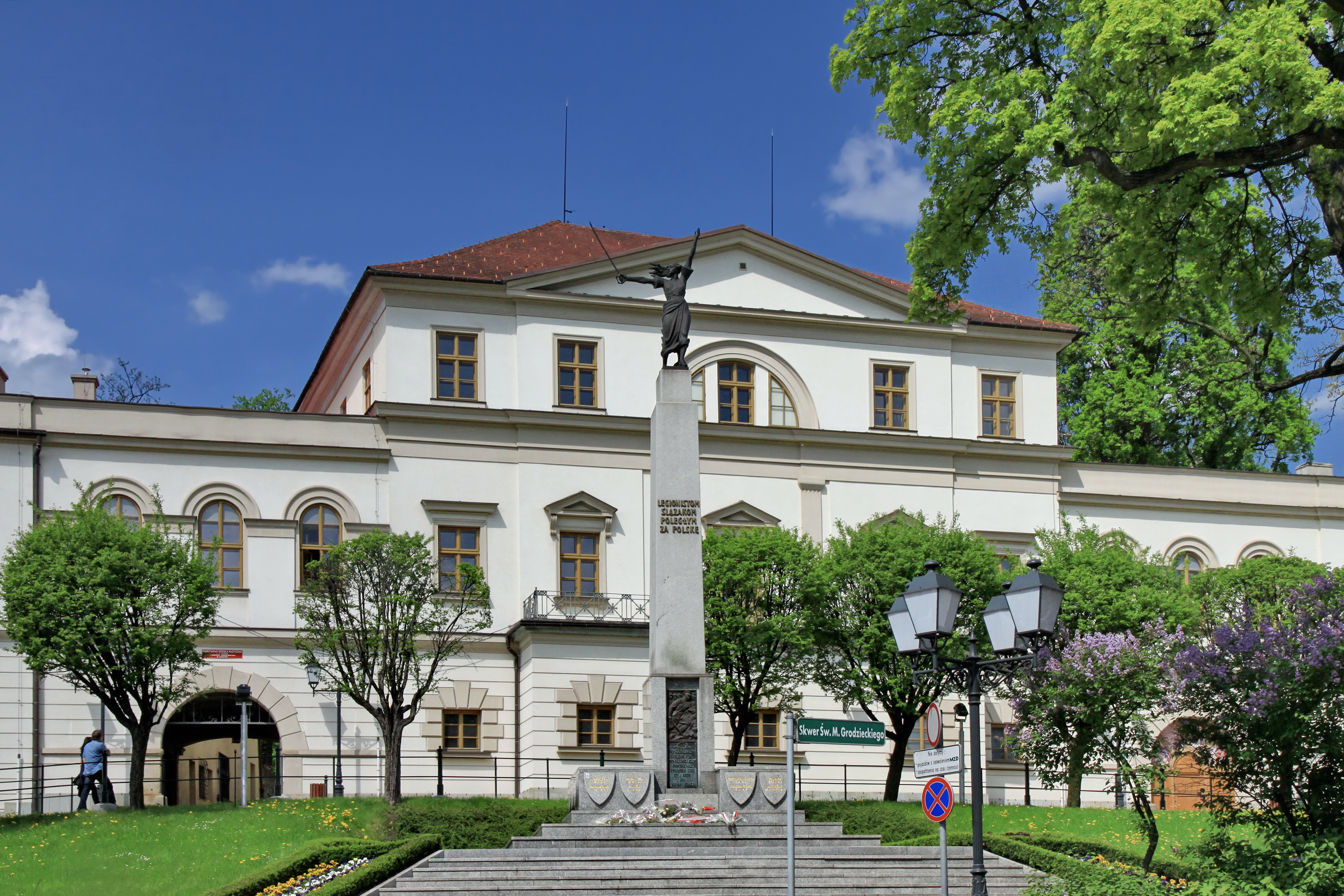
Habsburg Palace in Cieszyn

Habsburg Hunting Palace is a Classicist palace built in 1838–1840 in Cieszyn, Poland. It has been designed by Viennese architect Joseph Kornhäusel, constructed on the earthwork of the lower castle.

== History ==
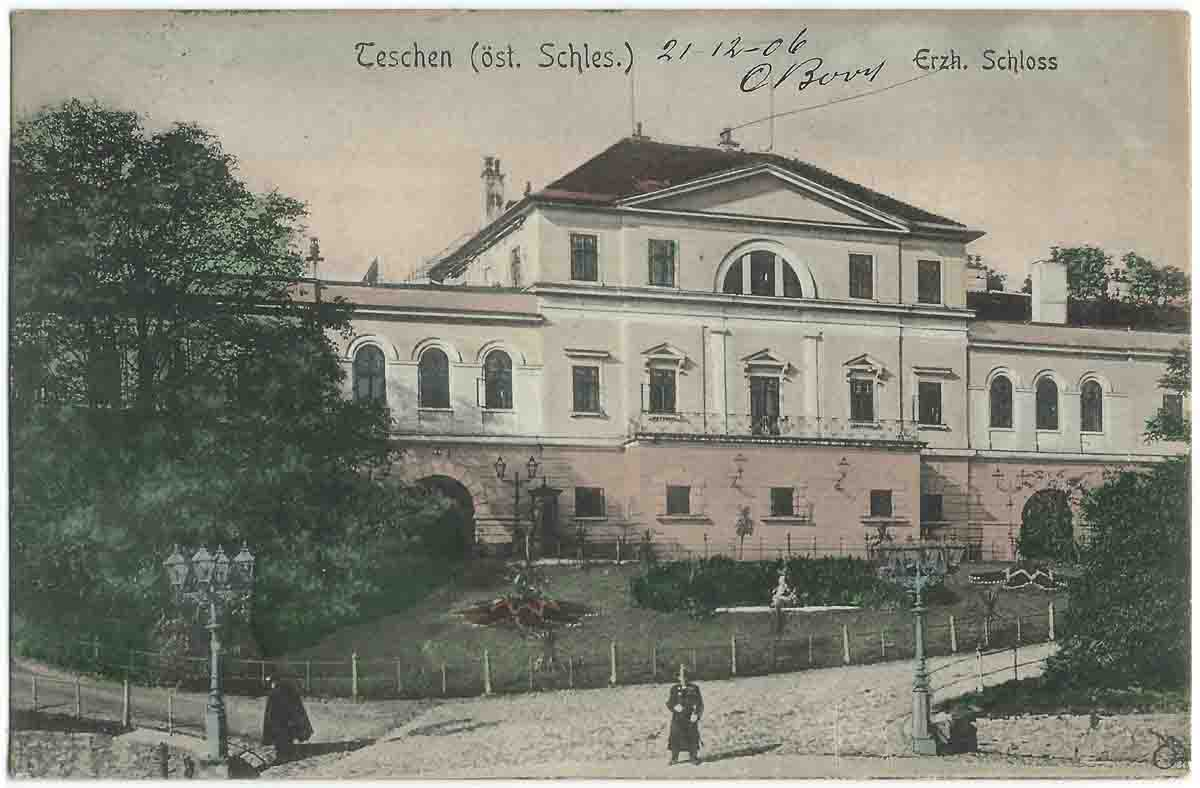
Habsburg Palace on the 1906 postcard

In 1838 Archduke Karl brought Joseph Kornhäusel, a representative of Viennese classicism, to Cieszyn. The upper and lower castles were destroyed during the Thirty Years' War. Karl Ludwig ordered Kornhäusel to rebuild the remains of the castle to make it his residence. To achieve the aim the ruins were demolished and the remains of the lower castle were used to build the so-called Hunting Palace between 1838 and 1840. Next to the palace a single-story classicist conservatory was built, which was demolished in 1966.

The palace did not perform its original function. It was rarely visited by the Habsburgs (who most often stayed in Vienna) and on everyday basis was the seat of the Chamber of Cieszyn. However, concerts and performances that took place in the conservatory that was located next to the palace became historical; a concert of Franz Liszt in June 1846 and Wagner performances of artists of the Viennese opera organised by the arch-duke Eugene Ferdinand at the end of the 1880s of the nineteenth century.

Occasional visits of the Habsburgs were always special events – one of the visitors was the emperor Francis Joseph the First who stayed in the Hunting Palace in 1880, 1890 and 1906. On the first floor of the palace there was a special suite consisting of a study, living room, reception room and a bedroom with a toilet, waiting for him. During the visits of Franz Joseph, the so-called Tent from Custoza was put up for him and his guests – a gift from the arch-duke Albrecht (the arch-duke took part in the victorious battle of Custoza).

When between 1914 and 1916 Cieszyn was the headquarters of the Austro-Hungarian Army (AOK – Armeeoberkommando), the archduke Frederick hosted his allies in the palace, among others the German emperor Wilhelm II, Bulgarian king Ferdinand and Marshal Hindenburg. The last visit of the archduke Ferdinand to the palace took place on 3 December 1916.

In 1918 the Hunting Palace became the seat of the National Council of the Duchy of Cieszyn, the first Polish authority in the area of Cieszyn Silesia. Since 1974 a part of the Hunting Palace has been the seat of the Ignacy Paderewski State School of Music. Since 2005, i.e. the time of renovation, the remaining part of the palace and a newly build conservatory (constructed at the site of the former) has served as the seat of Zamek Cieszyn (formerly: Śląski Zamek Sztuki i Przedsiębiorczości) – a cultural institution that is a design centre.

== Architecture ==
The Habsburg Palace was constructed as a hunting lodge. The palace, constructed on the plan of an inverted letter T, is located on the site of the lower castle on the eastern slope of a hill and its façade faces the city. The Habsburg residence is a two-story brick building. Its central part has three storeys. The central part of the palace is of a palladian structure of a serliana; an arch flanked at the sides by flat cornices and crowned by a triangle pediment. It is located between by two storeyed wings with symmetrically distributed vestibules. Builders used the remains of two fortified towers located in the south and north wings (so called bastei). In the 19th century side wings were added; the south one located perpendicularly and the north one parallel to the main part of the building.

The interior arrangement of the main part of the palace is based on a three bay plan, whereas the wings are based on a one bay plan with a corridor and a two bay plan. The interiors have a barrel vault with lunettes and a sail vault. There are also ceilings with coves.

The façade of the residence has thirteen axes, the three central ones of which have been emphasised by a protrusion and crowned by a triangular bridgehead. The one storey part has a projection with three axes and a balcony with a cast-iron balustrade. A storey of the building is made distinct by a central arch emphasised by pilasters that support entablature. The windows on the ground floor are square with dimpled frames, whereas the ones on the first floor are closed with triangular pediments on consoles and cornices on the side parts.

The side walls of the palace are multi-axis. A loggia located in the south fortified tower has four opened doric columns that support a triangular pediment.

In front of the palace there is a two-arm and symmetrical access road with the Monument to honour Silesian Legionnaires fallen for Poland, located between the arms of the road. The monument is designed by Jan Raszka and commemorates the fallen legionnaires of Silesia.

== Trivia ==
The Monument to honour Silesian Legionnaires fallen for Poland is also called The Silesian Woman and Nike of Cieszyn.

The walls of the north bastei are 2.1 metres thick.
