= Holy Cross Church, Cieszyn =

Baroque church in Cieszyn, Poland

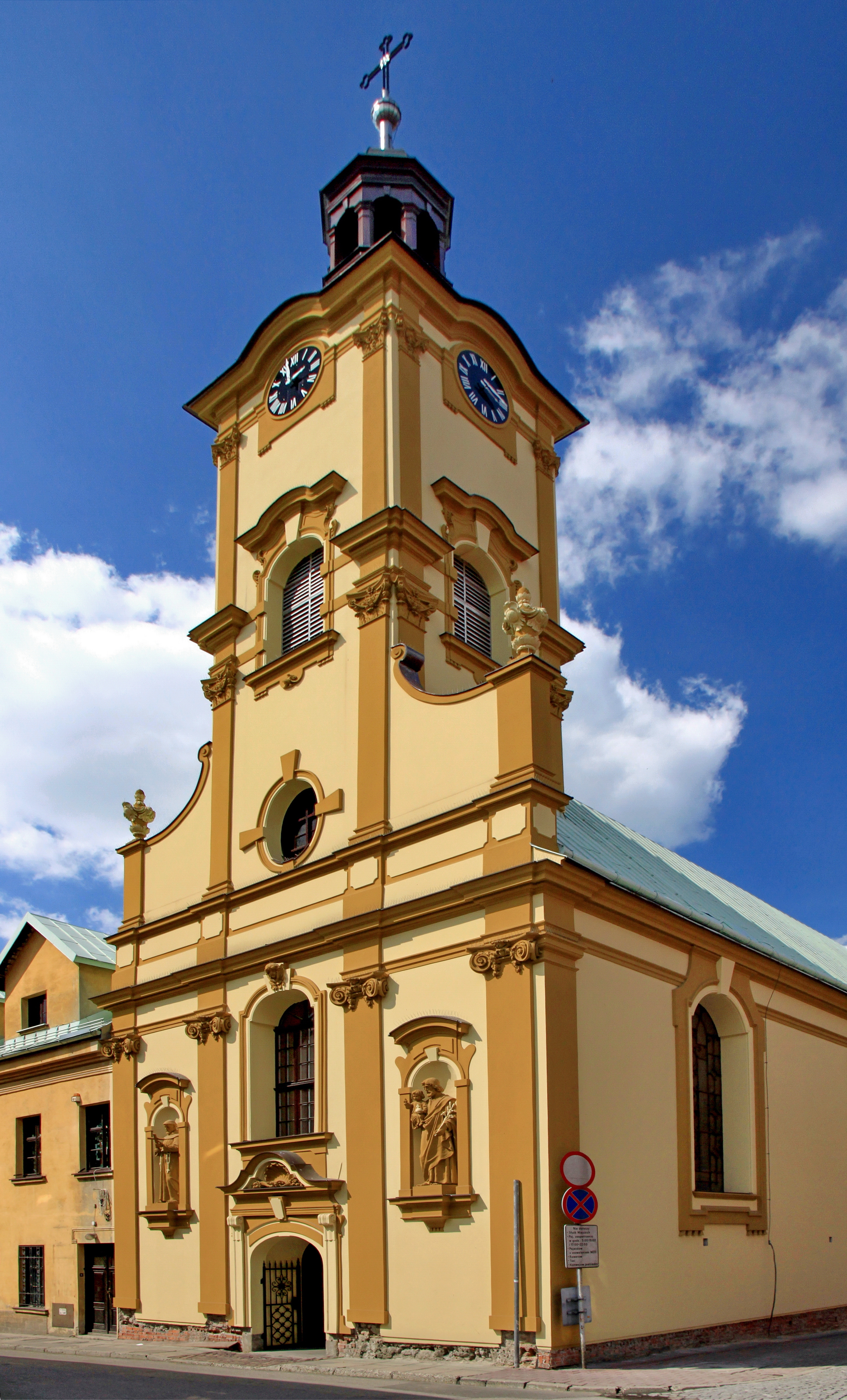
Holy Cross Church in Cieszyn

Holy Cross Church in Cieszyn is a Baroque church in Cieszyn, Poland, from the beginning of the 18th century. It is located in the city centre, on Szersznika street.

== History ==
Initially at the location of the church there was a chapel built in 1648, which was given to Jesuits after their arrival in Cieszyn in 1670. Franciscans found many supporters among the gentry of Cieszyn - one of them a starost Adam Wacław Paczyński built a sacristy and a pulpit and in 1712 he sponsored the construction of a monastery school (that was to be managed by Jesuits) for 16 poor children of the nobility who intended to study in Cieszyn. The chapel could house approx. 500 worshippers and in 1707, when Jesuit preaching became increasingly popular, it was converted into the Holy Cross Church. After the suppression of the Jesuit order in 1773 the church became a school church and was used mainly by pupils of Cieszyn grammar school. In 1791-92 father Leopold Szersznik supported extension of the church that was given, inter alia, a vaulting and a tower. After the fire in 1789, the Church was renovated in the baroque style. It was then when a new main altar was created in the Classicistic style with bas-relief showing the Crucifixion and the Last Supper. The church was renewed many times during the nineteenth and twentieth century and one major renovation took place in 1862 and involved alteration of the church tower.

In 1773 the Jesuit order was suppressed. The Jesuit residence in Cieszyn was sold, the grammar school was taken over by the state and the Holy Cross Church was converted into a grammar school church. Its supervisor became father Szersznik, who in 1782 vaulted the interior and built a tower with a helmet and an octagonal lantern. Also, it was he who managed the reconstruction of the church after the fire in 1789. In 1794 according to the plans of Andreas Kaspar Schweigl (currently without a superstructure). Most probably two side altars and a pulpit are of his design. A late baroque gallery was constructed as well.

Initially the church belonged to the parish of Saint Maria Magdalene up to 2005. Then it was leased to the order of St. Francis, which had a retreat centre in the neighbouring building of the former Jesuit monastery. Currently the monastery and the church belong to the Province of the Assumption of Virgin Mary of the Order of Minor Brothers in Katowice.

== Architecture ==
Holy Cross Church is built in a late Baroque style. It has one nave, three bays and is built on a rectangular plan. The nave of the church (with a tower in the middle) is closed by an apse behind which a sacristy, a former sacristy and a shed are located. On the ground floor there is a church porch opened to the nave by three arcades with a basket arch in stucco framework. The wall of the nave is divided by pillars with hollow corners embraced by Ionian pilasters and semi-pilasters. An old Baroque main altar, Baroque-classicistic pulpit and a Baroque music gallery survived until today. The altar part is oriented to the North and vaulted hemispherically with lunettes. The vaults of the church are of a sail shape and are separated by broad straps. There is a barrel vaulting with a segment arch in the sacristy, and in the former sacristy a barrel vaulting is enriched by lunettes. In the nave and the presbytery there is a nineteenth-century marble flooring with a two-colour theme. Pictures of Crucifixion (the main altar) and Virgin Mary (the side altar) are from the 18th and 19th century.

Late Baroque façade of the 18th century has three axes and has been divided by Ionian pilasters. On its axis there is a stone portal topped with a basket arch with a sinuous fronton. Over the portal one can see a window closed by a basket arch with a putta head in a keystone.

The façade is decorated by figures of Saint Francis of Assisi and St Joseph with Baby Jesus (located in the hemispherically vaulted niches), most probably due to the person of the emperor Francis Joseph I, listed on the renovation plague inside the church on the left hand side from the entrance. In the church there is also a wooden Baroque gallery, built after 1784 and a Baroque pulpit in the Baroque and classicistic style.

The upper level of the façade is separated from a gable and one-piece roof by a pedestal behind which a square tower with dials can be seen. In the corners of the tower composite pilasters were created. On the axis of the tower there is an oval window above which on four sides windows are placed closed by a semi-circular arch. The helmet of the tower is made of four pieces and has an octagonal lantern. In the side facade of the nave there is a big window closed by an overhung semi-circular arch with broad frames and keystones. The façade of the presbytery part is embraced by pilasters with windows in two climes.

== Holy Masses ==
Holy mass is celebrated on the following days:

Sundays and holy days of obligation: 10.00 A.M. and 7.00 P.M.

from Monday to Saturday: 9.00

For the youth: during a school year on Tuesdays at 7.00 P.M.
