= Karol Semik =

Polish teacher and educator

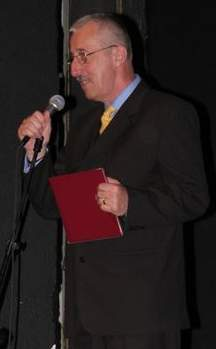
Karol Semik

Karol Semik (born 13 August 1953 in Cieszyn) is a Polish teacher and educator. Since 2008 the Superintendent.

The best graduate of AGH University of Science and Technology in Kraków in 1977. He was teaching assistant in Radom University of Technology.

1991-2007 the head teacher of the Lyceum No. 6 in Radom, one of the best lyceums in Poland. The postgraduate of University of Warsaw (1998) and University of Economics in Katowice (2003).

He became the Golden Cross of Merit, Medal of Commission of National Education and three times the Prize of Minister of National Education of the Republic of Poland (1994, 1999, 2000).

== Distinctions ==
1. Golden Cross of Merit (Złoty Krzyż Zasługi), 1995
2. Medal of Commission of National Education (Medal Komisji Edukacji Narodowej), 2001
3. Brązowy Medal za Zasługi dla Policji 2010
4. Long Service Medal (Złoty Medal za Długoletnią Służbę) 2010
