= The District Court and prison in Cieszyn =

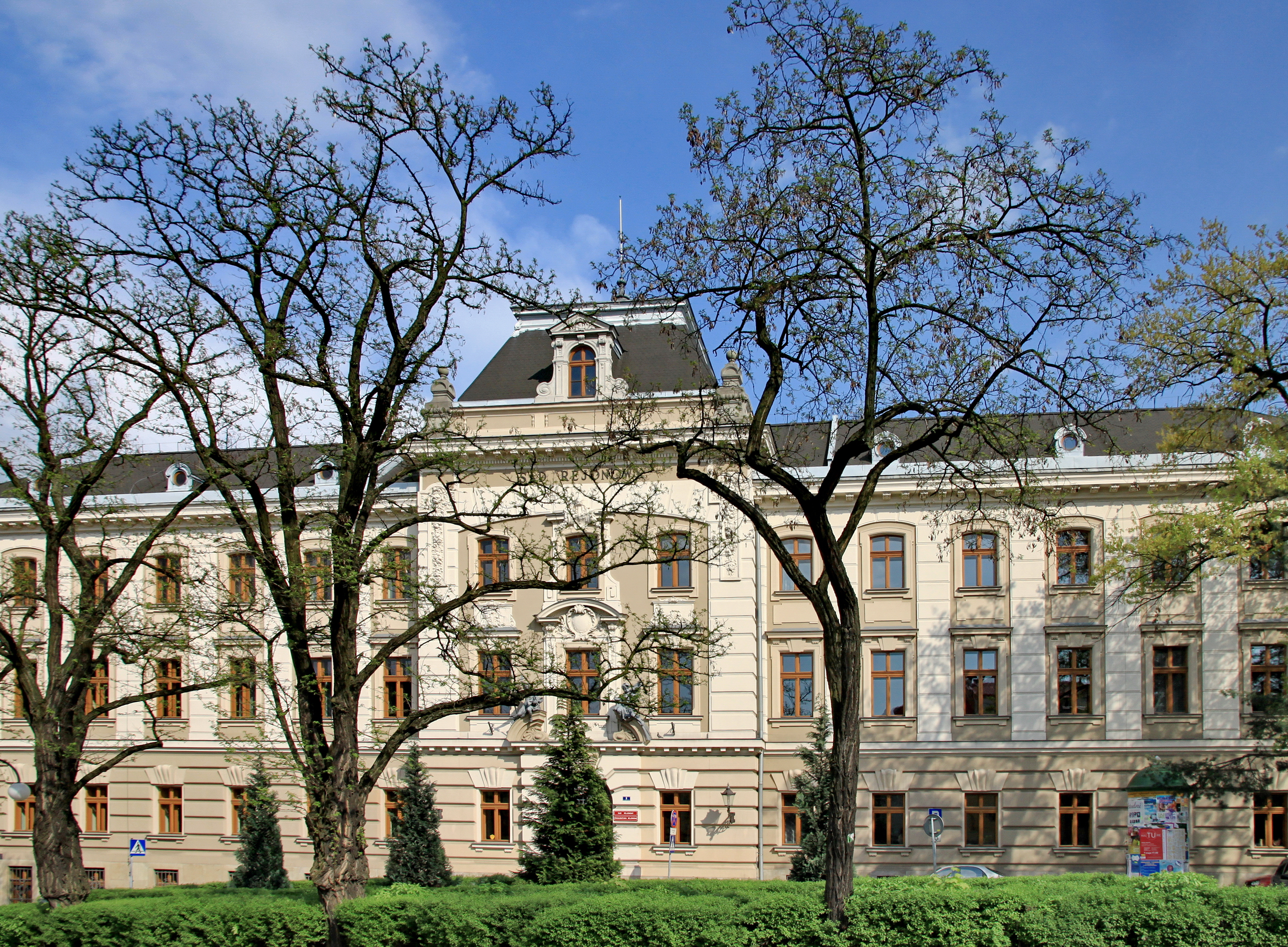
The main building of the District Court in Cieszyn

The district court and prison buildings of Cieszyn County in Poland are located in a complex of buildings in the city of Cieszyn.

The court building was constructed in 1905, the prison building in 1881. The buildings were registered as historic monuments in Poland under a registration number DAY-533/87 on 15.10.1987.

== Cieszyn district court building ==
=== History of court building ===
In 1901, court authorities in what was then the city of Cissy in the duchy of Cieszyn decided that they needed a new district court facility. The new court building was to be located at Garncarska street next to the existing prison building.

In 1901, Emanuel Harbich, the chairman of the regional court, commissioned Cieszyn architect Eugeniusz Fulda for the project. The building design was created by Rudolph Lang and Czesław Fulda. The court building was constructed on an almost square plan, 58 per 55 metres with an interior courtyard. Its cubature is 5647 m^{3}, the façade surface is 4467 m^{2}, and courtyard surface is 1200 m^{2}. The offices were outfitted by Viennese and local companies.

The new district court building opened on December 2, 1905, the 57th anniversary of enthronement of Emperor Franz Joseph I Habsburg. He visited the Court on September 2, 1906, planting an imperial oak in front of the building. The court building served as the Austrian Regional Court (Kreisgericht). In the past, there was a two-headed eagle and an inscription: "K. K. KREISGE-RICHT" - "Imperial-royal Regional Court" over a window on the second floor.

After World War I and the dissolution of the Austro-Hungarian Empire, Cieszyn was divided between the two new states of Poland and Czechoslovakia, with the district court building ending up in Poland. The court building currently houses the District Court in Cieszyn. In 2005, the building façades and the interior were restored.

=== Architecture of court building ===
The main façade of the district court building has a neo-baroque decor composed of rusticated belt plinth and windows. These are surmounted by a massive key. The windows on the first and second floors have classic bands with keystones and are located between vertical rusticated lisens. The facade is decorated by a central three-axes projection with an entrance gate with an axe and a bunch of fasces in the key (a symbol of justice) and intermittent bridgehead with sitting putti holding a scale and a sword (other attributes of justice). The court building has a tin gable roof with dormer windows, and the central projection is emphasised by a high mansard roof. The lobby and a triple staircase are decorated by classicistic arcades, marble columns and balustrades.

Opposite the building entrance, there is a two-metre-high (6.6 ft) statue made of a Canary marble - Iustitia, sculpted by a Viennese artist, Ernest Hegenbarth. It depicts the blindfolded goddess of justice Themis with a sword and an opened book in her hands. The lobby displays a commemorative plaque made of Swedish granite with an inscription in German: "Erbaut unter der Regierung Seiner Majestat des Kaisers Franz Joseph I. 1903-1905" ("Built under the reign of His Majesty the Emperor Francis Joseph I. 1903-1905"). There is another plaque from 1928 that commemorates Dr Feliks Bocheński, the organiser of the Polish judiciary in Silesia and the first Polish president of the District Court in Cieszyn.

The court building contains a representative court hearings hall. This is a two-story (9 metres high), large (15 per 9.5 metres) room with arcade windows on one of the longer walls and blind arcades in stucco decoration on the other walls. In one of the arcades there is a portrait of the emperor Francis Joseph I in his coronation attire by Aloysius Schwinger from Gratz. The hall is roofed by a mirror vault with semicircular lunettes and decorated by high wooden panelling, portals, a court grandstand and stair benches for the audience.

== Cieszyn prison building ==
=== Early history of prison building ===
In November 1858, Austro-Hungarian authorities drew up plans for construction of a prison in Cieszyn. Work on the new prison building began in March 1881. As with the court building, the prison building became part of Poland after World War I.

During World War II, the German occupation forces took over the prison. They used it as a punishment block and an investigation division from which prisoners were sent to other prisons and concentration camps. During this period, the prison held 12,000 inmates.

Smaller prison cells one could contain seven prisoners and several dozens in the bigger ones. Prison cells were heated by tiled stoves opened from the side of prison corridors. Large rooms and workshops were lightened by gas lamps. On the premises of the prison there were the following facilities: a pigsty, a carpentry workshop, a basket workshop, a noodle factory, garages and two chapels, one Catholic and one Protestant.

In the mid 1950's a pulmonary diseases hospital was opened in a part of the prison building.

=== Renovations of prison building ===
In the 1980's, the prison building underwent a total overhaul that included renovation of the sewage, water and electricity systems. Each prison cell was supplied with running hot water and hospital units were equipped with separate toilets with washbasins in shared prison cells. 1992 saw the separation of a part for the temporarily imprisoned. The penitentiary part had 155 rooms. The prisoners could use three common rooms and two libraries and the hospital units had their own baths. Since the renovation, the prison has been heated by the Cieszyn heating network.

From 2005 to 2007, the prison building (the residential part for the prisoners) underwent another general overhaul. Apart from a renovationz of the prison cells, a canteen was created. Also, the library, the radio broadcast center, and the chapel were renovated. In 2005, the Pulmonary Diseases Hospital was closed to increase the inmate capacity to 406.

In 2008, prisoners of the Penitential Unit in Cieszyn worked for the Municipal Roads Administration in Cieszyn, cleaning drainage ditches and general cleaning.

On 3 June 2009, a video installation was organised on the Cieszyn prison walls, entitled "On the walls of the prison of Cieszyn" by Jarosław Skutnik and Adam Molenda. This event was organised within the framework of the Alternative Off -stage organised along the 20th edition of the International Theatre Festival Without Borders.

In 2009, prisoners of the Penitential Unit cleaned up a Jewish cemetery in Cieszyn. The inmates re-erected matzevas and cleared brush.

On 23 October 2013, a performance of the play "Osadzony" took place in the Cieszyn prison. Directed by Bogusław Słupczyński, it was based on the novel by Daniel Smętek. The theatre project was sponsored by the University of Silesia Branch in Cieszyn and the Penitentiary Unit.

== Description of prison building ==
The prison building currently has 406 places for penal recidivists. There is a separate section for people being detained by the District Court and District Prosecutor's Office in Cieszyn; and the District Court and District Prosecutor's Office in Jastrzębie Zdrój.

All prison cells have separate lockable sanitary corners, and are equipped with speakers of the radio broadcast center and household intercoms for contact with the officer in charge and terminals for television signal reception.
