= Pastwiska, Cieszyn =

Coordinates: 49°46′11″N 18°38′15″E

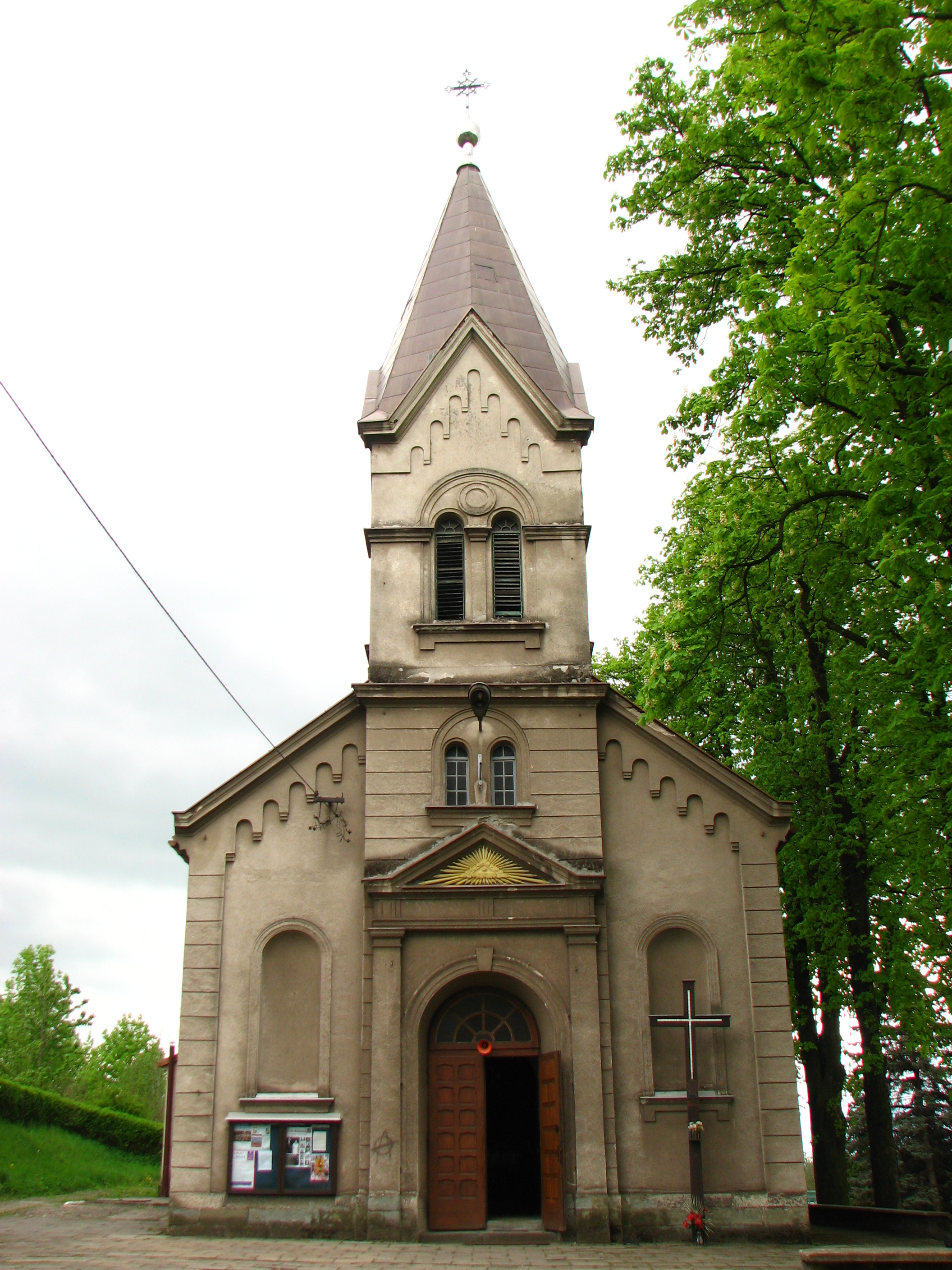
Church of the Providence of God

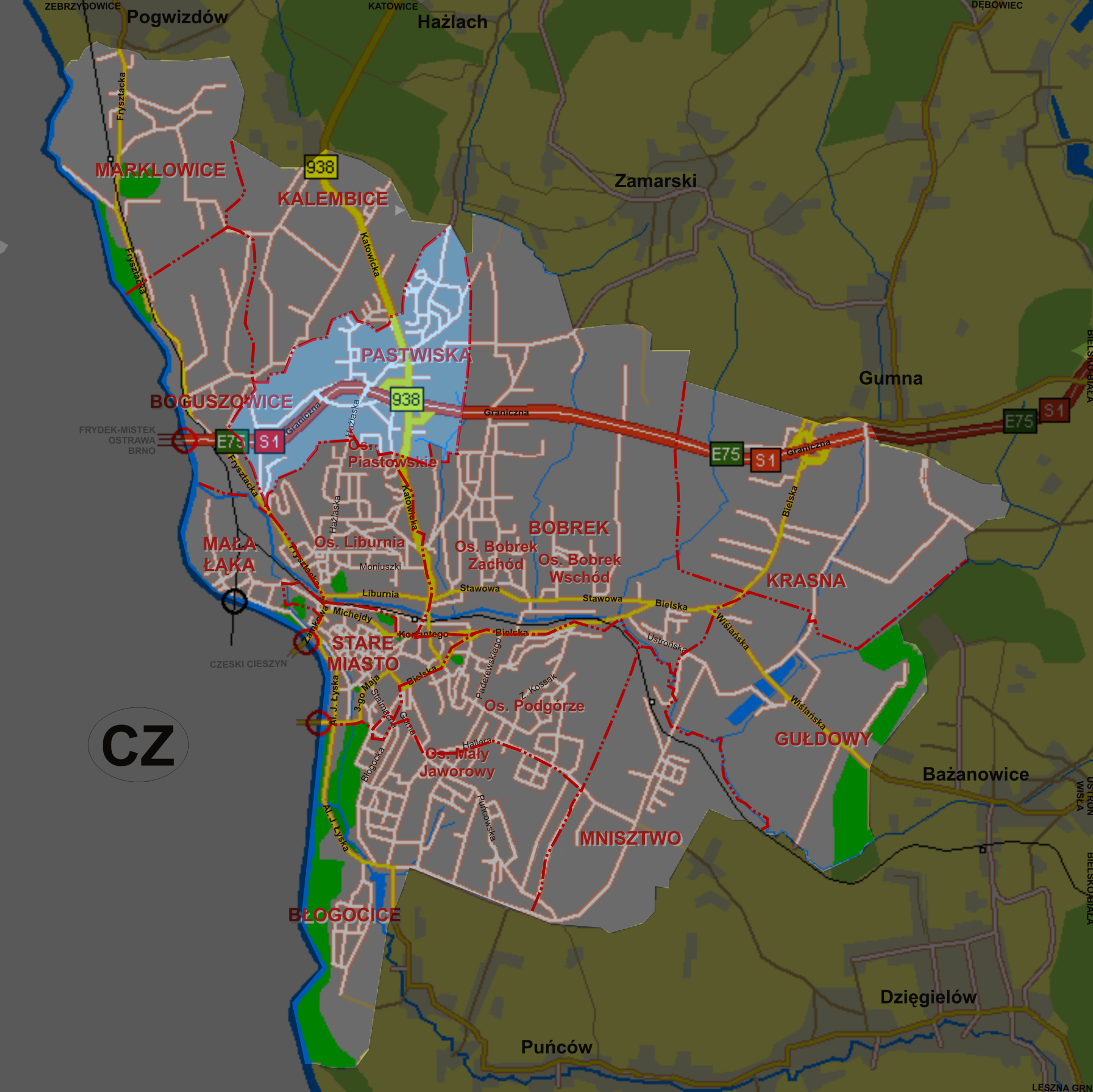
Pastwiska highlighted on map of Cieszyn

Pastwiska is a district of Cieszyn, Silesian Voivodeship, Poland. It was a separate municipality, but became administratively a part of Cieszyn in 1973. It lies in the Silesian Foothills in the historical region of Cieszyn Silesia.

The name of the village is cultural in origins and literally means pastures in Polish, clearly suggesting the origin of the name and a role it served to citizens of Cieszyn.

== History ==
The village was first mentioned in 1565 as Pastwysky, when a dukal folwark was located here. Politically it belonged then to the Duchy of Teschen, a fee of the Kingdom of Bohemia, which after 1526 became part of the Habsburg monarchy.

After Revolutions of 1848 in the Austrian Empire a modern municipal division was introduced in the re-established Austrian Silesia. The village as a municipality was subscribed to the political and legal district of Cieszyn. According to the censuses conducted in 1880, 1890, 1900 and 1910 the population of the municipality dropped from 880 in 1880 to 1,680 in 1910 with a growing majority being native Polish-speakers (from 87.4% in 1880 to 97.7% in 1910) accompanied by a small German-speaking minority (at most 104 or 11.9%, then dropping to 36 or 2.2% in 1910) and Czech-speaking people (at most 6 or 0.7% in 1880). In terms of religion in 1910 the majority were Roman Catholics (75.4%), followed by Protestants (22.4%) and Jews (21 or 2.2%). The village was also traditionally inhabited by Cieszyn Vlachs, speaking Cieszyn Silesian dialect.

After World War I, fall of Austria-Hungary, Polish–Czechoslovak War and the division of Cieszyn Silesia in 1920, it became a part of Poland. It was then annexed by Nazi Germany at the beginning of World War II. After the war it was restored to Poland.
