= List of flags of the German Empire =

Flags used by the German Empire and its constituent states

Below is the list of flags used by the German Empire, which includes all flags used by the German Empire (1871–1918), along with its kingdoms, duchies and principalities.

== National and merchant flags ==
Flag	Date	Use	Description
	1871–1918	Official national flag of the German Empire	The national flag combined the colors of Prussia (black and white) and the colors of Brandenburg (red and white). While this flag already functioned as the flag of the German Empire in practice, it wasn't until 1892 that it was officially designated as the national flag.
	1867–1903	Jack of the North German Confederation and the German Empire	By order of Wilhelm I on 4 July 1867, this flag was designated as the war flag (Kriegsflagge) and jack (Kriegsgösch) of the North German Confederation.
	1896–1918	Merchant flag of the German Empire with the Iron Cross	On 1 July 1896, a special flag was adopted for use in ships commanded by retired or reserve naval officers. This flag, designated as the Merchant Flag with Iron Cross (Handelsflagge mit eisernem Kreuz), is similar to the Jack of the North German Confederation, although the Iron Cross is now touching the hoist edge.

== Standards of the House of Hohenzollern ==
Flag	Date	Use	Description
	1871	Standard of the German Emperor	This standard was proposed by Wilhelm I and his son, Friedrich, on 3 August 1871. Friedrich insisted that the standard of the German Emperor continue using the background of the Prussian royal standard. The Iron Cross on a royal purple (red) background, and emblazoned with the words "Gott mit uns" (God with us), along with the year 1870. In each corner, two imperial crowns and two Prussian eagles. The central shield in a silver (white) version. This standard was only used for a little over two months, from 3 August until 15 October 1871.
	1871–1888	Standard of the German Emperor	This second standard was proposed by the supreme heraldist of the German Empire, Rudolf von Stillfried-Rattonitz, who argued that gold (yellow) was more precious of a color than royal purple (red). Wilhelm I conceded to his opinion, and ordered the background color of the standard to be changed to yellow. Aside from the new background color, each corner now has three imperial eagles and one imperial crown, while the central shield now has a yellow background.
	1888–1918	Standard of His Majesty the German Emperor	"The standard, 4 meters square, is made of golden-yellow silk and displays the Iron Cross, overlaid with the lesser coat of arms of His Majesty. In each angle of the cross appear an imperial crown and three black eagles with red talons and beaks. As soon as His Majesty boards a ship, the imperial standard is hoisted at the top of the mainmast, and all other command and distinguishing marks are removed." The shape of the imperial eagles and the central coat of arms has been changed compared to the previous version. The imperial crown also has a slightly different form.
	1871–1901	Standard of Her Majesty German Empress Victoria, Princess Royal	The Empress's standard, which resembled the Emperor's, omitted the large Iron Cross. Instead, a smaller version was placed in the upper inner corner. The International Nurses Cross rested upon this smaller cross. The flag was covered with 26 scattered imperial eagles. The Empress's crown, in its 1871 version, was placed on the escutcheon. The standard was designed in 1871 for Augusta of Saxe-Weimar-Eisenach, wife of Wilhelm I, and was also used by the second Empress, Victoria of Great Britain and Ireland, wife of Frederick III. After the deaths of the first two German Emperors, the standard continued to be used by both Empress Augusta—until her death in 1890—and Empress Frederick—until her death in 1901.
	1888–1918	Standard of Her Majesty the German Empress	A new standard was created for the wife of Wilhelm II. The red cross in the slimmer Iron Cross at the top-left corner was omitted, and a Prussian crown, the letter "W," and the year "1870" were added to the Iron Cross. The number of the redesigned imperial eagles was reduced to 16, and the Empress's old crown was replaced by the current model from 1888.
	1871–1888	Standard of His Imperial and Royal Highness the German Crown Prince	This standard was essentially the same as that of the German Emperor, however, the imperial crown was removed from the corners, so that three imperial eagles were visible in each corner. The central shield, on which the crown prince's crown was located, was bordered in red.
	1888–1918	Standard of His Imperial and Royal Highness the German Crown Prince	This version of the standard is similar to the previous version, however, there are now four imperial eagles in each corner.

== Ensigns and jacks used by the Kaiserliche Marine ==
Flag	Date	Use	Description
	1871–1892	War flag	From 2 March, 1886, the following additional persons were permitted to fly the German war flag on their private vessels at sea: The sovereigns of the German states (the federal states), the princes of the imperial house and other German royal houses, as well as the first mayors of the free Hanseatic cities.
	1892–1903	Reichskriegsflagge	"The white flag (3.75 m high, 6.25 m long) is divided into two shorter and two longer fields by a black cross, the arms of which are again accompanied by black lines. The first, upper field (1.6 m high, 2.4 m long) displays the imperial colors black-white-red and bears the Iron Cross in the center. At the intersection of the arms lies a circular, white medallion with the Prussian eagle."
	1903–1918	Reichskriegsflagge	Officially designated as the "Imperial war flag" (Reichskriegsflagge), this variant of the previous flag apparently had a wider cross.
	1903–1918	Naval jack	The jack displays the imperial colors black, white, and red and bears the Iron Cross in the center. It is "hoisted on holidays, festive occasions, inspections, etc."
	1871–1918	Pilot signal flag	The national flag surrounded by a white border, of which the width is one-fifths of the entire flag. The pilot signal flag is used by ships and merchant vessels to indicate that they require pilotage.
	1889–1918	Flag of the State Secretary in the Imperial Naval Office	The flag of an admiral with two crossed, clear yellow anchors in the bottom-left corner. Since this flag was not a command flag, flags of admirals, etc., were hoisted instead.
	1871–1889	Flag of the Chief of the Admiralty	Around the reduced cross of an admiral's flag are four red, anchors arranged crosswise.
	1889–1899	Flag of the Commanding Admiral	The imperial crown, lined in red and without ribbons, was placed on an admiral's cross. This flag replaced that of the Chief of the Admiralty.
	1899–1900	Flag of the Inspector General of the Navy	This flag replaced that of the Commanding Admiral.
	Around 1900	Flag of the Inspector General of the Navy	Apparently a temporary version used for a short time, which was quickly replaced by the subsequent one. This flag appears to have a thicker red border than the previous version used.
	1900–1918	Flag of the Inspector General of the Navy	This version of the flag replaced the first version of the flag, mainly due to visual improvements. It became apparent that the narrow red border on the first version of the flag was barely visible at great distances, making it indistinguishable from the admiral flag. The admiral's cross was likewise placed within the white square for aesthetic reasons.
	1908–1918	Flag of the Chief of the Naval Staff with the rank of Admiral	The admiral flag with, at the center, a disk of white in which is contained a rope circle and a downward pointing rope sword.
	1908–1918	Flag of the Chief of the Naval Staff with the rank of Vice Admiral	Like the previous one, except with the addition of a dot in the top-left corner.
	1908–1918	Flag of the Chief of the Naval Staff with the rank of Rear Admiral	Like the previous one, except with the addition of two "rank balls."
	1908–1918	Command flag of a Grand Admiral	Two Grand Admiral batons are placed on an Admiral's ensign. Above these is the Imperial Crown with ribbons. This highest rank in the Imperial Navy was created in 1900 at the specific request of the Naval Command to provide an equivalent to the Army Field Marshal. Kaiser Wilhelm II himself initially assumed this title in 1900. The first Grand Admiral from the Kriegsmarine to receive this flag was Hans von Koester in 1905.

=== Broad pennant of the German Emperor and Empress ===
Flag	Date	Use	Description
	1895–1918	Broad pennant of the German Emperor	In 1895, Wilhelm II introduced a special broad pennant (Breitwimpel), which can be sometimes hoisted in place of his personal standard. The broad pennant of the German Emperor was considered the highest command insignia of the Imperial Navy, which was only placed in place of the imperial standard by personal order of the Emperor.
	1908–1918	Broad pennant of the German Empress	Depiction of the Empress's crown from 1888. The broad pennant was only raised on the Empress's orders. On ships, it was hoisted at the mainmast; on boats, at the bow. When the Empress's broad pennant was flying, parades, boarding, salutes, marching, and flag displays were omitted. The guard did not assemble; however, the crew on deck had to be summoned by the bugle signal "Attention!"

=== Command flags of admirals ===
Flag	Date	Use	Description
	1867–1918	Command flag of an admiral	The admiral's cross on a white field.
	1867–1918	Command flag of a vice admiralmand flag of a vice admiral	The admiral's cross on a white field, with one rank ball on the top-left corner.
	1867–1918	Command flag of a rear admiral	The admiral's cross on a white field, with two rank balls, each on the top-left and bottom-left corners.
	1904–1918	Command flag of a vice admiral of the second squadron of the active battle fleet	Until 1904, all flags were flown with black rank balls. Flag officers of the 1st Squadron retained black balls in their command flags even after 1904.
	1904–1918	Command flag of a rear admiral of the second squadron of the active battle fleet	Like the previous one, but with two rank balls.

=== Naval pennants ===
Flag	Date	Use	Description
	1871–1918	Commodore pennant	Hoisted when at least two ironclads were under the command of a commodore and captain. The pennant was to be hoisted at the mainmast. On ships of lesser strength, the pennant had to be hoisted at the foremast.
	1871–1918	Commodore pennant (for ships of lesser strength)	Hoisted by a captain at sea and commodore when commanding ships of lesser power and there was no possibility of hoisting the pennant on the foremast.
	1871–1918	Commodore pennant for a deputy commodore of the second squadron	Like the previous pennant, but belonging to the second squadron of the active battle fleet
	1871–1918	Seniority pennant	Equivalent to the commodore's pennant. It was hoisted by the most senior officer of equal rank on ships at anchor or in port when no superior officer was present. In this case, the pennant had to be hoisted on the yardarm of the aft mast.
	1871–1918	Flotilla pennant	Hoisted by naval officers entrusted with the command of a flotilla, unless they were entitled to display a rank insignia.
	1871–1918	Division pennant	Hoisted by naval officers entrusted with the command of a division, unless they were entitled to display a rank insignia.
	1871–1918	Commander pennant	A black-white-red burgee pennant. Hoisted by commanders of naval groups who were not entitled to display a rank insignia or other pennant.

== Flag of the Commander-in-Chief of the Armed Forces in China ==
By order of Wilhelm II on 21 August, 1900, a special command insignia was issued to the German intervention force in China during the Boxer Rebellion. German Field Marshal Alfred von Waldersee was appointed as the Commander-in-Chief of this force. The command insignia was also sometimes used as a square standard. After the German contingent returned in September 1901, the flag was displayed in a museum in Berlin.

Flag	Date	Use	Description
	1900–1901	Flag of the Commander-in-Chief of the Armed Forces in China	The naval jack with crossed marshal's batons protruding from beneath the Iron Cross.

== Other naval jacks and ensigns of the German Empire ==
The naval jacks previously mentioned were only used on warships and ships flying a service flag. They were only hoisted by ships at anchor, and even then only on special, precisely defined occasions. Merchant ships could fly any jack.

Flag	Date	Use	Description
	1871–1892	Ensign of other royal vessels	The war flag with a clear blue anchor in the inner lower corner. Its exact designation was: "Flag of the other government vehicles belonging to the Commerce department."
	1871–1892	Ensign of customs administration vessels	Like the previous one, but with the additional red letters "KZ" between which the anchor was located.
	1871–1892	Ensign of pilot vessels	The war flag with two crossed blue anchors in the bottom-left corner.
	1871–1892	Ensign of hired transport vessels	The German war flag with four red crosswise-arranged anchors in the inner, lower corner.
	1871–1892	Jack of other royal vessels	The national flag, charged with a blue anchor positioned centrally.
	1871–1892	Jack of customs administration vessels	Like the previous one, but with the additional red letters "KZ" between which the anchor was located.
	1871–1892	Jack of pilot vessels	The national flag, charged with two crossed blue anchors positioned centrally.
	1871–1892	Jack of hired transport vessels	The national flag, charged with four red crosswise-arranged anchors positioned centrally.
	1892–1918	Flag of the Imperial Postal Service	In 1892, new service flags were introduced, which replaced the former naval jacks and ensigns.
	1893–1918	Imperial service flag at sea	The national flag, defaced with a crowned yellow anchor, placed on a white circle positioned centrally. This flag replaced the jacks and ensigns previously used by the Imperial Navy. In certain coastal states and Hanseatic cities, the flag is charged with insignia of that state or city, along with its abbreviated purpose as red letters.
	1893–1918	Imperial service flag on land	The national flag, defaced with the imperial crown with ribbons, placed on a white circle positioned centrally.
	1892–1919	Service flag of the German Foreign Office	It is a black-white-red flag with a white circular cut-out in the black and red stripe. In the white central disk an Imperial Eagle with the Imperial Crown. This flag was also used by the Imperial Colonial Office.

== Flags for sailing and yacht clubs ==
Several sailing and yacht clubs were permitted to fly special flags. Wilhelm II himself was a member of the Imperial Yacht Club in Kiel. In total, six sailing and yacht clubs were allowed to sail their special flags, which were usually variants of the national flag emblazoned with their own symbols.

Flag	Date	Use	Description
	1893–1918	Flag of the Imperial Yacht Club in Kiel	The imperial service flag at sea with the following modifications: a medallion in the shape of an ellipse surrounded by a rope wreath turned to the right. On the shaft of the anchor lies a yellow shield with the imperial German eagle, which bears a Hohenzollern shield on its breast.
	1906–1918	Flag of the Sailing Club "Rhe" in Königsberg	The Prussian eagle placed on a shield, which itself is placed on a shield with the Teutonic Order cross.
	1911–1918	Flag of the Grand Ducal Mecklenburg Yacht Club in Rostock	The imperial flag with the Mecklenburg naval ensign as its canton. In the center, a golden coat of arms with the black Rostock griffin. Above the shield is a golden Wendish crown.
	1913–1918	Flag of the Royal Württemberg Yacht Club in Friedrichshafen	The coat of arms of the Counts of Württemberg placed on a shield, with the royal crown above it.
	1914–1918	Flag of the Imperial Motor Yacht Club Berlin-Charlottenburg	A cogwheel and a coat of arms with the imperial German eagle are placed on an anchor. Above it is the imperial crown without ribbons, all surrounded by a wreath of rope.
	1914–1918	Flag of the German Sailing Association in Hamburg	The German eagle placed on a coat of arms.

== Other special flags ==
=== Armorial banners ===
In 1905, Wilhelm II designated two heraldic flags to indicate to the public whether he was aboard a ship or available to receive visitors. These were known as the Blue Armorial Banner ("His Majesty is not receiving") and the Yellow Armorial Banner ("His Majesty is not aboard"). The heraldic flags were hoisted halfway up the mainmast and were always displayed alongside the Imperial Standard and the Grand Admiral's Flag.

Flag	Date	Use	Description
	1905–1918	"His majesty is not aboard."	Coat of arms of the Burgraviate of Nuremberg, as well as the flag used under the Raabs. Used to indicate that the Emperor is not aboard a ship.
	1905–1918	"His majesty is not receiving."	Shield of the Archchamberlain of the Holy Roman Empire. Used to indicate that the Emperor is not available to receive visitors.

=== Special masthead flags ===
Wilhelm II permitted two ships of the Imperial Navy to fly a special masthead flag, which could be hoisted on special occasions. These were the ironclad SMS Brandenburg and the battleship SMS Preußen.

Flag	Date	Use	Description
	1893–1918	Masthead flag of the ironclad SMS Brandenburg	The former ensign of the Brandenburg Navy.
	1906–1918	Masthead flag of the battleship SMS Preußen	During Kiel Week on 21 June 1906, Preußen received this flag as a gift from the provinces of East Prussia and West Prussia.

=== Church pennant ===
The church pennant was flown on board ships of the Imperial Navy when church services were held. For this purpose, the stern flag was flown at half-mast, while the church pennant was hoisted above the stern flag.

Flag	Date	Use	Description
	1871–1918	Church pennant	Appears to be an elongated pennant featuring the Cross of St. George on a white field.

== Army flags ==
Flag	Date	Use	Description
	1871–1918	Flag for the General Staff and the High Command.	The flag appears to contain a quarterly-divided square in the center with colors black and white, and surrounded by a red border.
	1871–1918	Flag for the staff of a general command	A diagonally-divided flag with colors black, white, and red.
	1871–1918	Flag for the staff of a division	The national flag as a pennant.

== Colonial flags ==
Flag	Date	Use	Description
	1892–1918	Service flag of the Imperial Colonial Office	The national flag with the Reichsadler in a circular, white center field. The flag was also the service flag of the German Foreign Office.
	1893–1918	Pilot flag of the protectorates	The service flag of the Imperial Colonial Office, along with the red letters "LV." There is a yellow anchor in the middle of the red letters.
	1893–1918	Service flag of the customs office in the protectorates	The service flag of the Imperial Colonial Office, along with the red letters "ZV." There is a yellow anchor in the middle of the red letters.
	1871–1892	Ensign of mail ships	The German war flag with a golden horn in the inner, bottom corner.
	1871–1892	Jack of mail ships	Until 1892, mail ships sailed with their own jack. In the center white stripe a golden horn.
	1891–1918	Flag of the Governor of German East Africa	The imperial eagle, without crown or chain, was placed in the white central stripe. Governors of other colonies did not fly their own flag. This command flag was only used at sea: on ships of the Imperial Navy or the governor's vessel at the stern, and on boats at the bow. Government vessels under the governor's command were to fly the service flag of the other government vessels belonging to the trade sector. (This continued until November 8, 1892, when this service flag was abolished and replaced by the service flag of the Imperial Colonial Office (possibly with the additional letters "LV" or "ZV"). Specifically for German East Africa, a Supreme Order decreed on August 21, 1893, that from that date onward, all government authorities were to fly the Imperial War Flag.
	1898–1918	Flag of the Governor of the Kiautschou Bay Leased Territory	Essentially identical to the flag of the Governor of German East Africa. Basically the same regulations applied as with the previous flag; only the salute rules differed slightly.
	1878–1894	Flag of the Ralik Chain	In 1878, Captain Bartholemäus von Werner designed this flag, which is essentially the national flag of Germany with two additional stripes, one white and one black. The flag had apparently been well-received with the locals.

=== Flags of the German colonial companies ===
Flag	Date	Use	Description
	1885–1895	Flag of the German East Africa Company	A lesser known flag, this flag was used from 1885 up until 1895. It is unclear if the stars were supposed to be five-pointed or four-pointed.
	1895–1918	Flag of the German East Africa Company	Otherwise known as Carl Peter's Flag, named after Carl Peter, who was the founder of the Society for German Colonization, and personally designed this flag.
	1904	Flag of the German East Africa Railway Company	The flag of the German East Africa Railway Company was a diagonally-divided flag with colors black, white, and red, along with a roundel with a circular winged track on it, along with the initials of the company "OAEG."
	1896–1918	Flag of the German West Africa Company	This flag was used for the German West Africa Company, which operated in Kamerun and Togoland.
	1885–1899	Flag of the German New Guinea Company	The flag contains a white field with the canton showing the imperial colors, and an heraldic lion holding a red Bourbon lily on the fly.
	c. 1880	Flag of Hernsheim & Co.	Hernsheim & Co. used a red flag with the initials of the company in white.
	c. 1887	Flag of the Jaluit Company	Initially, the Jaluit Atoll Company used a red flag with the initials of the company in white.
	c. 1890	Flag of the Jaluit Company	The Jaluit Company later used this flag, which depicts a white field with a globe with the imperial colors, which apparently symbolized the world under German control.

=== Proposed colonial flags ===
In 1913, it was considered that the colonies of the German Empire would receive their own flags and coats of arms. The first drafts were made in 1914, but were never implemented due to the outbreak of World War I.

Flag	Date	Use	Description
	1914	Proposed flag for German East Africa	These flags were first proposed in 1914. However, they were never actually implemented due to the outbreak of World War I. The coats of arms all show the imperial eagle, but not on the flag itself.
	1914	Proposed flag for Kamerun	These flags were first proposed in 1914. However, they were never actually implemented due to the outbreak of World War I. The coats of arms all show the imperial eagle, but not on the flag itself.
	1914	Proposed flag for German New Guinea	These flags were first proposed in 1914. However, they were never actually implemented due to the outbreak of World War I. The coats of arms all show the imperial eagle, but not on the flag itself.
	1914	Proposed flag for German Samoa	These flags were first proposed in 1914. However, they were never actually implemented due to the outbreak of World War I. The coats of arms all show the imperial eagle, but not on the flag itself.
	1914	Proposed flag for German South West Africa	These flags were first proposed in 1914. However, they were never actually implemented due to the outbreak of World War I. The coats of arms all show the imperial eagle, but not on the flag itself.
	1914	Proposed flag for Togoland	These flags were first proposed in 1914. However, they were never actually implemented due to the outbreak of World War I. The coats of arms all show the imperial eagle, but not on the flag itself.

=== Likely incorrect flag of the German West Africa Company or German colonies in West Africa ===
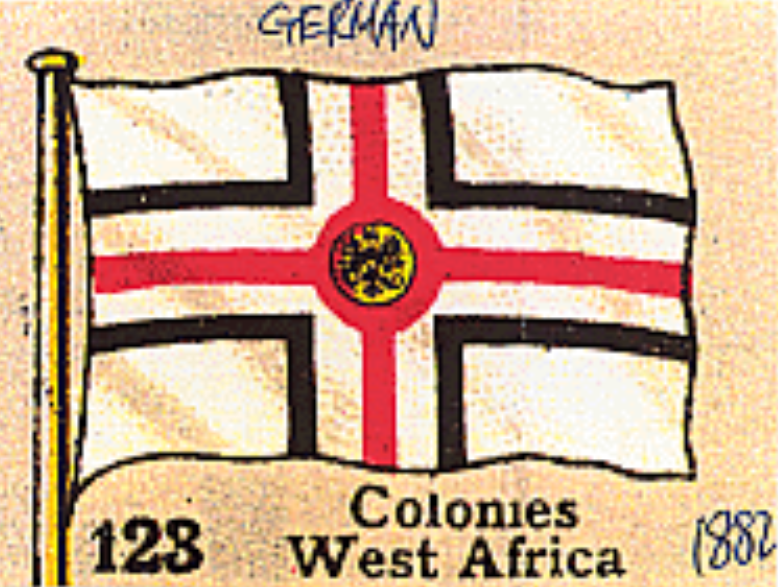
The depiction of the likely incorrect flag.

In an obscure and unidentified 1882 source, there was a flag was likely supposed to represent the German West Africa Company or German colonies in West Africa, based on the text "Colonies West Africa." However, no other evidence exists that suggests that this was a flag that was ever used by the German West Africa Company.

Flag	Date	Use	Description
	1882(?)	Unknown	The flag has a white field with a black firmbriated white cross with a red cross within. In the center is a black German eagle drawn in a red-bordered yellow circle.

Since the flag bears resemblance to that of the German West Africa Company, except without letters, it is possible that this flag may have been a draft or proposal when the company name or initials were yet to be decided.

== Flags of the Imperial Territory of Alsace-Lorraine ==
Following the end of the Franco-Prussian War, the territories of Alsace and the Lorraine department of Moselle were annexed by the newly-formed German Empire. These territories were incorporated into the Imperial Territory of Alsace-Lorraine (Reichsland Elsaß-Lothringen). During the time that it was part of the German Empire, Alsace-Lorraine officially used the German national flag, as well as a separate flag for state institutions of Alsace-Lorraine. The red-white flag, while unofficial, was popular in Alsace, and was frequently used for decorative displays and on postcards. However, it was also sometimes used as a symbol of protest against German annexation.

Flag	Date	Use	Description
	1870–1918	Flag for the Imperial Territory of Alsace-Lorraine	The German national flag.
	1892–1918	Service flag for state institutions of Alsace-Lorraine	The official flag of the German Foreign Office and the Imperial Colonial Office, featuring the crowned coat of arms of Alsace-Lorraine in the upper corner.
	1912/1918	Proposed flag in 1912. Flag of the Republic of Alsace-Lorraine	Flag for the Reichsland, adopted by the Landtag on 25 June, 1912, but not officially introduced by the government. Flag of the Republic of Alsace-Lorraine from 11/12 until 21 November 1918.

== Decorative flags ==
Decorative flags were very popular in the German Empire. The most popular of these flags was the Reichsadlerflagge, which combined the black, white, and red colors with the imperial eagle. However, depictions of the emperor, the imperial family, and complex combinations of these elements were also used instead. In all cases, these were unofficial flags that could be used by any individual. They were purely decorative flags without any official function.

Flag	Date	Use	Description
	1871–1918	Reichsadlerflagge	The national flag with a broader white central stripe and an imperial eagle positioned near the hoist within it. This flag appears to be the most popular variant of the Reichsadlerflagge. One was apparently found in the German embassy in Ottawa, Canada, while a vertical variant of the flag appears to have been used as decoration for lamp posts on occasions.
	1871–1918	Reichsadlerflagge (Variation 1)	Similar to the previous version, although the upper and lower stripes were replaced with narrow versions of the national flag.
	1871–1918	Reichsadlerflagge (Variation 2)	Similar to the previous version, although the imperial eagle is now positioned centrally and widened. This specific depiction appears to depict the imperial eagle with a gold (dark yellowish) tint.
	1871–1918	Decorative flag	This specific decorative flag has a depiction of Wilhelm II in a crowned oval frame, two imperial flags on the left and right along with a laurel wreath, and the words "Mit Gott für Kaiser und Reich!" (With God for Emperor and Realm!).

== Regional flags ==
The various German monarchies and governments continued to exist after the unification of Germany, now as constituent states of the German Empire. Their flags and symbols continued to be used alongside the German flags and symbols.

=== Kingdoms ===
Flag	Date	Use	Description
	since 1878	Flag of the Kingdom of Bavaria	This flag was adopted as the official flag in 1878. The colors were taken from the coat of arms and the lozenged flag of the House of Wittelsbach.
	1803–1892	Flag of the Kingdom of Prussia	The imperial eagle on a white field.
	1892–1918	Flag of the Kingdom of Prussia	The imperial eagle on a white field, with two narrow black stripes at the top and bottom.
	1892–1918	Civil ensign of the Kingdom of Prussia	Swallowtail variant of the flag of Prussia used from 1892 to 1918.
	1894–1918	Service flag for state vessels and buildings of the Navy	The imperial service flag for use at sea, along with the imperial eagle on a white square in the top-left corner.
	1894–1918	Flag of the customs administration of Prussia	Similar to the above flag, but with the red letters "ZV" on both sides of the anchor.
	1894–1918	Pilot flag of Prussia	Similar to the above flag, but with the red letters "LV" on both sides of the anchor.
	1894–1918	Service flag of the fishery inspection service in Prussia	Similar to the above flag, but with the red letters "FA" on both sides of the anchor.
	1906–1918	Prussian war and service flag	A swallowtail variant of the flag of Prussia used from 1892 to 1918, however, the black bars are now removed, and there is an Iron Cross in the top-left corner. This flag was also used as a special masthead flag by the battleship SMS Preußen.
	Unknown	Service flag for inland waterways in Prussia	Similar to the above flag, but with a silver, anchor in the bottom-left corner.
	1815–1918	Flag of the Kingdom of Saxony	The white-green bicolor flag of Saxony was adopted via a royal decree in 1815, which already had some tradition in Saxony.
	1896–1918 (unofficial flag before 1896)	Flag of the Kingdom of Württemberg	A horizontal black-red bicolor. The colors of the flag appears to have come from Württemberg's coat of arms.

=== Grand duchies and duchies ===
Flag	Date	Use	Description
	1871–1891	Civil ensign of the Grand Duchy of Baden	A horizonal red-yellow bicolor flag.
	1891–1918	Civil ensign of the Grand Duchy of Baden	A horizontal yellow-red-yellow triband flag. This flag replaced the previous version because it better represented elements of the coat of arms of Baden, and also to better distinguish its flag from other bicolor flags with the same colors.
	1839–1903	Flag of the Grand Duchy of Hesse	A horizontal red-white-red triband flag, along with the uncrowned lesser coat of arms of Hesse. The flag proportions are 4:5.
	1855–1918	Flag of Mecklenburg for use at sea.	A horizontal tricolor flag with colors blue, white, and red.
	1863–1918	Flag of the Grand Duchy of Mecklenburg-Schwerin and the Grand Duchy of Mecklenburg-Strelitz	A horizontal tricolor flag with colors blue, yellow, and red.
	1774–1918	Flag of the Grand Duchy of Oldenburg	A red Scandinavian cross on a blue field.
	1813–1897	Flag of the Grand Duchy of Saxe-Weimar-Eisenach	A horizontal tricolor flag with colors black, green, and yellow.
	1897–1920	Flag of the Grand Duchy of Saxe-Weimar-Eisenach	This flag was similar to the previous flag. However, the colors had been rearranged to black, yellow, and green.
	1863–1918	Flag of the Duchy of Anhalt	A horizontal tricolor flag with colors red, green, and white.
	1830–1918	Flag of the Duchy of Brunswick	A horizontal bicolor flag with colors blue and yellow.
	1893–1918	Flag of the Duchy of Saxe-Altenburg	A horizontal bicolor flag with colors green and white, along with the crowned, lesser coat of arms of Saxe-Altenburg in the center.
	1909–1918	Ducal standard of the Duchy of Saxe-Altenburg	The flag had five white stripes and five green stripes, along with the coat of arms of Saxony as the canton.
	1830–1918	Flag of the Duchy of Saxe-Coburg-Gotha	A horizontal bicolor flag with colors green and white.
	1880–1918	Flag of the Duchy of Saxe-Coburg-Gotha	Flag of the authorities until at least 1918 (but never officially designated). This is a variant of the flag with four stripes and colors green, white, green, and white.

=== Principalities ===
Flag	Date	Use	Description
	c. 1858– c. 1880	Flag of the Principality of Lippe	Essentially identical to the flag of the Grand Duchy of Baden used from 1871 until 1891. Also used to be a civil flag preceding 1880.
	c. 1815–1935	Flag of the Principality of Lippe	Similar to the previous flag, but with the colors rearranged.
	c. 1820–1918	Flag of the Principality of Reuss-Greiz	Essentially identical to the modern-day flag of Germany, except for the flag proportions.
	c. 1820–1918	Flag of the Principality of Reuss-Gera	A vertical tricolor flag with colors black, red, and gold.
	c. 1830–1918	Flag of the Principality of Waldeck and Pyrmont	Essentially identical to the modern-day flag of Germany.
	(?)–c. 1880	Flag of the Principality of Schaumburg-Lippe	A horizontal bicolor flag with colors gold and red. Essentially identical to the flag of the Principality of Lippe used from 1880 until 1918.
	1813–1897	Flag of the Principality of Schaumburg-Lippe	A horizontal tricolor flag with colors white, red, and blue.
	c. 1815–1918	Flag of the Principality of Schwarzburg-Rudolstadt	A horizontal bicolor flag with colors blue and white.
	c. 1815–1918	Flag of the Principality of Schwarzburg-Sondershausen	Essentially identical to the previous flag.

== Flags of the cities within the Hanseatic League ==
Flag	Date	Use	Description
	1891–1918	State flag of the Free Hanseatic City of Bremen	A flag with sixteen stripes, eight red and eight white, and defaced with the flag version of the Bremen coat of arms.
	1891–1892	Service flag for state vessels and buildings of the Navy for use in Bremen	A flag with eight stripes, four red and four white, and defaced with the lesser coat of arms of Bremen, as well as a clear blue anchor on a white canton.
	1895–1918	Service flag for state vessels and buildings of the Navy for use in Bremen	The imperial service flag, but with the lesser coat of arms of Bremen in the canton.
	1895–1918	Service flag of the customs administration for use in Bremen	Similar to the previous version, but with the red letters "ZV."
	1895–1918	Pilot flag of Bremen	Similar to the previous version, but with the red letters "LV."
	since 1897	Flag of the Free Hanseatic City of Hamburg	The flag contains a red field, along with a white castle with three towers positioned near the hoist, and two starts, each on the two outer towers of the castle. There were apparently no exact specifications on how the castle should be displayed.
	1893–1918	Admirality flag of the Free Hanseatic City of Hamburg	Similar to the previous flag, but with a blue anchor behind the castle. The flag was mainly used by maritime authorities, hoisted on ships as a jack, or flown on buildings of maritime authorities.
	1894–1918	Service flag for state vessels and buildings of the Navy for use in Hamburg	The imperial service flag, but with the admirality flag of Hamburg as the canton.
	1890–1918	Flag of the Free Hanseatic City of Lübeck	A white-red bicolor defaced with a black, uncrowned double-headed eagle, with the breast shield being that of the lesser coat of arms of Lübeck.
	1895–1918	Service flag for state vessels and buildings of the Navy for use in Lübeck	The imperial service flag, but with the black, uncrowned double-headed eagle used in the flag of Lübeck.
	1895–1918	Service flag of the customs administration for use in Lübeck	Similar to the previous version, but with the red letters "ZV."
	1895–1918	Pilot flag of Lübeck	Similar to the previous version, but with the red letters "LV."
	1895–1918	Service flag of the fishery inspection service in Lübeck	Similar to the previous version, but with the red letters "FA."
	1880–1918	Service flag for inland waterways in Lübeck	The flag of Lübeck, along with a gold, anchor in the bottom left corner. The anchor appears to be orientated slightly to the hoist.

== Flags of the Prussian provinces ==
Flag	Date	Use	Description
	1882–1918	Flag of the Province of Brandenburg	A red and white horizontal bicolor flag. The colors were also derived from the "Marconian Eagle," the coat of arms of the former Margraviate of Brandenburg.
	1882–1918	Flag of the Province of East Prussia	The colors of Prussia, black and white, on a bicolor flag.
	1882–1918	Flag of the Province of West Prussia	A black-white-black horizontal triband flag.
	1848–1918	Flag of the Province of Hohenzollern	A white-black horizontal bicolor flag. The colors of the flag were derived from the coat of arms of the House of Hohenzollern.
	1882–1918	Flag of the Province of Pomerania	A blue-white horizontal bicolor flag.
	1882–1918	Flag of the Province of Silesia	A white-yellow horizontal bicolor flag.
	1886–1918	Flag of the Province of Posen	A white-black-white horizontal triband. This replaced the flag previously used (a red-white bicolor), because the previous flag was considered too Polish by the Prussian authorities.
	1882–1918	Flag of Rhenish Prussia	A green-white horizontal bicolor flag. The colors were derived from the coat of arms of the Rhineland, which is a white wavy line on a green background (representing the Rhine River). A variant of this flag, one with the coat of arms of Rhineland, was sometimes used by the Landschaftsverband Rheinland in Cologne.
	1882–1918	Flag of the Province of Westphalia	A white-red horizontal bicolor flag. The colors were derived from Westphalia's coat of arms, a white horse on a red background.
	1882–1918	Flag of Prussian Saxony	A black-gold horizontal bicolor flag. The colors were derived from the coat of arms and the traditional colors of Saxony. The flag is not to be confused with that of the Austrian Empire.
	1882–1918	Flag of the Province of Hanover	While the symbols of the former Kingdom of Hanover were very popular among Hanoverians (such as the Hanoverian coat of arms and the yellow-white flag with the Hanoverian arms), the Prussian government abstained from using these symbols. As a compromise, the Prussians allowed Hanover to use the standalone yellow-white flag.
	c. 1866–1918	Flag of the Province of Hesse-Nassau	A red-white-blue horizontal tricolor flag. This flag combined the colors of the city of Frankfurt and the Electorate of Hesse-Kassel.
	1867–1918	Flag of the Province of Schleswig-Holstein	A blue-white-red horizontal tricolor flag. Before the German Empire, it was first flown in 1843, but was banned by Danish authorities in 1845 due to being viewed as a symbol of rebellion against Denmark. While the flag didn't become an official symbol against after annexation by Prussia in 1867, it continued to be used, and essentially became the de-facto official flag of Schleswig-Holstein.

=== Proposed flags for the Provinces of Prussia ===
Flag	Date	Use	Description
	1882	Proposed flag for Prussian Saxony	A green-yellow-black horizontal tricolor flag. This was the first proposal for a flag of Prussian Saxony, but was not ratified by the provincial parliament.
	1882–1884	Proposed flag for Prussian Saxony	A black-white-green horizontal tricolor flag. The flag was apparently a compromise with both Prussian and Saxon colors. The flag was not ratified by the King of Prussia.
