= Wójcin =

Wójcin may refer to:

- Wójcin, Mogilno County in Kuyavian-Pomeranian Voivodeship (north-central Poland)
- Wójcin, Lower Silesian Voivodeship (south-west Poland)
- Wójcin, Radziejów County in Kuyavian-Pomeranian Voivodeship (north-central Poland)
- Wójcin, Żnin County in Kuyavian-Pomeranian Voivodeship (north-central Poland)
- Wójcin, Opoczno County in Łódź Voivodeship (central Poland)
- Wójcin, Wieruszów County in Łódź Voivodeship (central Poland)
- Wójcin, West Pomeranian Voivodeship (north-west Poland)
