= Kowalskie =

Kowalskie may refer to the following places in Poland:

- Kowalskie, Lower Silesian Voivodeship (south-west Poland)
- Kowalskie, Greater Poland Voivodeship (west-central Poland)
