= Brochocinek =

Brochocinek may refer to the following places in Poland:

- Brochocinek, Lower Silesian Voivodeship (south-west Poland)
- Brochocinek, Masovian Voivodeship (east-central Poland)
