= Anita Novinsky =

Brazilian historian (1922–2021)

- Born: Anita Waingort; November 22, 1922; Stachów, Poland
- Died: July 20, 2021 (aged 98); São Paulo, Brazil
- Citizenship: Brazilian, Polish
- Education: University of São Paulo
- Known for: History of Brasil, History of Portugal, Portuguese Inquisition
- Spouse: Mauricio Novinsky
- Scientific career
- Fields: History
- Workplaces: University of São Paulo

Anita Waingort Novinsky (22 November 1922 – 20 July 2021) was a Brazilian historian, who specialized in the Portuguese Inquisition in Brazil, and the history of Jewish presence in Brazil, notably, the customs of the Crypto-Jews of the country and the renaissance of the awareness of their Jewish roots, 200 years after the end of the Inquisition in Brazil. She was the author of several books on this subject, an associate professor and the founder and chairperson of the Museum of Tolerance at the University of São Paulo.

== Personal life ==
Novinsky was born in Stachów, Poland, and migrated to Brazil with her family when she was one year old. She later became a Brazilian citizen and held Brazilian and Polish citizenship.

She earned a degree in philosophy from the University of São Paulo in 1956, with a specialization in psychology from the University of São Paulo in 1958, her Ph.D. in Social History from the University of São Paulo in 1970 and a specialization in Racism in the Iberian World from Ecole des Hautes Études en Sciences Sociales in 1977. She taught as an associate professor at the University of São Paulo. Her specialization was the study of New Christians, those Portuguese and Spanish Jews also known as conversos or marranos who converted or were forced to convert to Christianity during the Middle Ages, but continued to practice Judaism in secret and pretended to be fervently Catholic in public. She was the author of several books in this area.

Novinsky founded and served as chairperson of the Museum of Tolerance at the University of Sao Paulo.

She died in São Paulo on July 20, 2021.

== Career ==
Novinsky obtained a degree in Philosophy from the University of São Paulo in 1956, pursuing a specialization in Psychology two years later. In 1970, she received a Ph.D. in Social History from the University of São Paulo, a specialization on racism in Ibero-America in 1977 from the École des hautes études en sciences sociales in France, and a post-doc title from the Université Paris 1 Panthéon-Sorbonne in 1983. She was a professor emeritus of her alma mater, the University of São Paulo.

She was the founder of the Laboratory for Intolerance Studies of the University of São Paulo. The Federal Rural University of Pernambuco has a class named after her. Apart from having been the director of Religious and Social Science Studies at the École pratique des hautes études in Paris, Novinsky was a visiting professor at The State University of New Jersey, University of Texas at Austin and Brown University.

=== Authority on the Inquisition ===
Novinsky is considered one of the leading authorities when it comes to the Portuguese Inquisition. In 2013, the National Council for Scientific and Technological Development honored her with the distinction of Pioneer of Science in Brazil as a recognition of her research.

The documentary film The Hidden Star of the Sertão, about communities of crypto-Jews in the Brazilian north-east, is based extensively in her research, including an interview with the researcher herself.

== Works ==
- Cristãos-novos na Bahia: 1624-1654. Perspectiva, Ed da Universidade de São Paulo, 1972.
- Bens confiscados a Cristãos-novos no Brasil, século XVIII. Editora Imprensa Nacional - Casa da Moeda, 1978, Lisboa
- Inquisição. Cristãos Novos na Bahia, 11ª edición. Editorial Perspectiva, São Paulo, 2007.
- Gabinete de Investigação: uma “caça aos judeus” sem precedentes. Brasil-Holanda, séculos XVII e XVIII. Editora Humanitas, São Paulo, 2007.
- O Santo Ofício da Inquisição no Maranhão. A Inquisição de 1731. Editorial Universidad Estatal de Maranhão, São Luiz, Maranhão, 2006.
- The Myth of the Marrano Names. Revue des Études Juives, 2006.
- Inquisição: Prisioneiros do Brasil. Editorial Expressão e Cultura, Río de Janeiro, 2002.
- Ibéria Judaica. Roteiros da Memória. Editorial Expressão, Río de Janeiro y EDUSP, São Paulo, 1996.
- Inquisição. Ensaios sobre Mentalidades, Heresias e Arte. Editorial Expressão e Cultura, Río de Janeiro, 1992
- Inquisição. Rol dos Culpados. Editorial Expressão e Cultura, Río de Janeiro, 1992
- O olhar Judaico em Machado de Assis. Editorial Expressão e Cultura, Río de Janeiro, 1990.
- Inquisição: Inventários de bens confiscados a cristãos novos no Brasil Editorial Imprensa Nacional. Casa de la Moneda, Lisboa, 1978.
- Padre Antônio Vieira, a Inquisição e os Judeus
- Os judeus que construíram o Brasil, 2016.
