= The Hidden Star of the Sertão =

A Estrela Oculta do Sertão
- Directed by: Elaine Eiger; Luize Valente
- Production company: Fototema
- Release date: 2005
- Running time: 85 minutes
- Country: Brazil
- Language: Portuguese

The Hidden Star of the Sertão (in Portuguese, A Estrela Oculta do Sertão) is a 2005 Brazilian documentary directed by photographer Elaine Eiger and the journalist Luize Valente. The central theme of the documentary is the crypto-jewish practices maintained by some families in the semi-arid northeast of Brazil (the Sertão) together with the search for their religious identity for many converts from the moment they have become aware of their origins.

The documentary presents interviews and part of the research work of the historian of the University of São Paulo, Anita Novinsky, who is considered a leading authority on the subject of the Inquisition in Brazil, the genealogist Paulo Valadares, and the anthropologist of the Collège de France, Nathan Wachtel.

== Synopsis ==
The idea of the directors to make the documentary arose in 2000, after reading a newspaper article about a town with less than 800 inhabitants in the extreme west of the Brazilian state of Rio Grande do Norte, called Venha-Ver. According to the report, an American rabbi who had been to the village previously found that the townspeople maintained uniquely Jewish customs like lighting candles on Friday night, the circumcision of their baby sons on the eight day after the infant's birth, and slaughtering chickens in a way very similar to shechita, despite claiming to be Catholic. Many of these customs were already so old that they even fell into disuse for centuries within Judaism. Certain Jewish customs, in particular, are maintained, which end up revealing their true origin: they are descendants of the so-called cristãos-Novos (Marranos), Jews forced to convert to Christianity during the Inquisition in Portugal, thanks to a decree of King Manuel, established in 1497.

During the Dutch invasion of Brazil in the 17th century, the Dutch crown, which was at the forefront of the movement for the reform of Catholicism, had adopted a policy to accommodate religious persecution in many parts of Europe. Most of the Jewish immigrants who settle in the country lived in misery. With the capture of the port of Recife by the Netherlands, these groups were attracted by the opportunity to advance in the richest Portuguese captaincy of the time, and the ships chartered by Jews arrived almost every month in Recife, later passing inland, after the resumption of Portuguese rule. The documentary is divided into two parts: the first, shows various characters as specialists in Jewish culture, families who returned to practice Judaism and Catholic families that keep certain Jewish customs, especially in various towns in the states of Paraíba and Rio Grande do Norte.

== Awards ==
The film received the Best Documentary Award at the São Paulo International Jewish Film Festival.
