= Czerwieniec =

Czerwieniec may refer to the following places in Poland:

- Czerwieniec, Lower Silesian Voivodeship (south-west Poland)
- Czerwieniec, Pomeranian Voivodeship (north Poland)
