= Edwardów, Lower Silesian Voivodeship =

Edwardów
- Village
- Location within Poland
- Coordinates: 50°47′25″N 16°58′13″E
- Country: Poland
- Voivodeship: Lower Silesian
- County: Strzelin
- Gmina: Kondratowice

Edwardów [ɛdˈvarduf] is a village in the administrative district of Gmina Kondratowice, within Strzelin County, Lower Silesian Voivodeship, in south-western Poland.
