= Sadowice, Strzelin County =

Sadowice
- Village
- Location within Poland
- Coordinates: 50°43′52″N 16°58′23″E
- Country: Poland
- Voivodeship: Lower Silesian
- County: Strzelin
- Gmina: Kondratowice

Sadowice [sadɔˈvit͡sɛ] is a village in the administrative district of Gmina Kondratowice, within Strzelin County, Lower Silesian Voivodeship, in south-western Poland.
