= Manfred Geisler =

German footballer

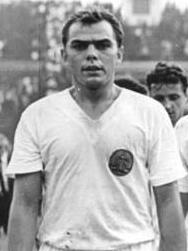
- Geisler in 1966

Personal information
- Date of birth: 3 March 1941 (age 85)
- Place of birth: Prauß, German Reich
- Position: Defender

Senior career*
Years	Team	Apps	(Gls)
1959–1976	SC Rotation / SC /: 1. FC Lokomotive Leipzig	348	(63)
1976–1978	BSG Chemie Leipzig	22	(4)

International career
1965–1967	East Germany	15	(1)
Medal record
Men's football
Representing Germany
Olympic Games
Bronze medal – third place	1964 Tokyo	Team competition
- * Club domestic league appearances and goals

Manfred Geisler (born 3 March 1941 in Prauß) is a German former football player who competed in the 1964 Summer Olympics.

== Club career ==
In the East German top-flight he scored 45 goals in 318 matches.

== International career ==
Geisler won 15 caps for the East German national team.
