= Strachów, Strzelin County =

Strachów
- Village
- Location within Poland
- Coordinates: 50°44′N 16°53′E
- Country: Poland
- Voivodeship: Lower Silesian
- County: Strzelin
- Gmina: Kondratowice

Strachów [ˈstraxuf] is a village in the administrative district of Gmina Kondratowice, within Strzelin County, Lower Silesian Voivodeship, in south-western Poland.
