= Kondratowice =

- Village
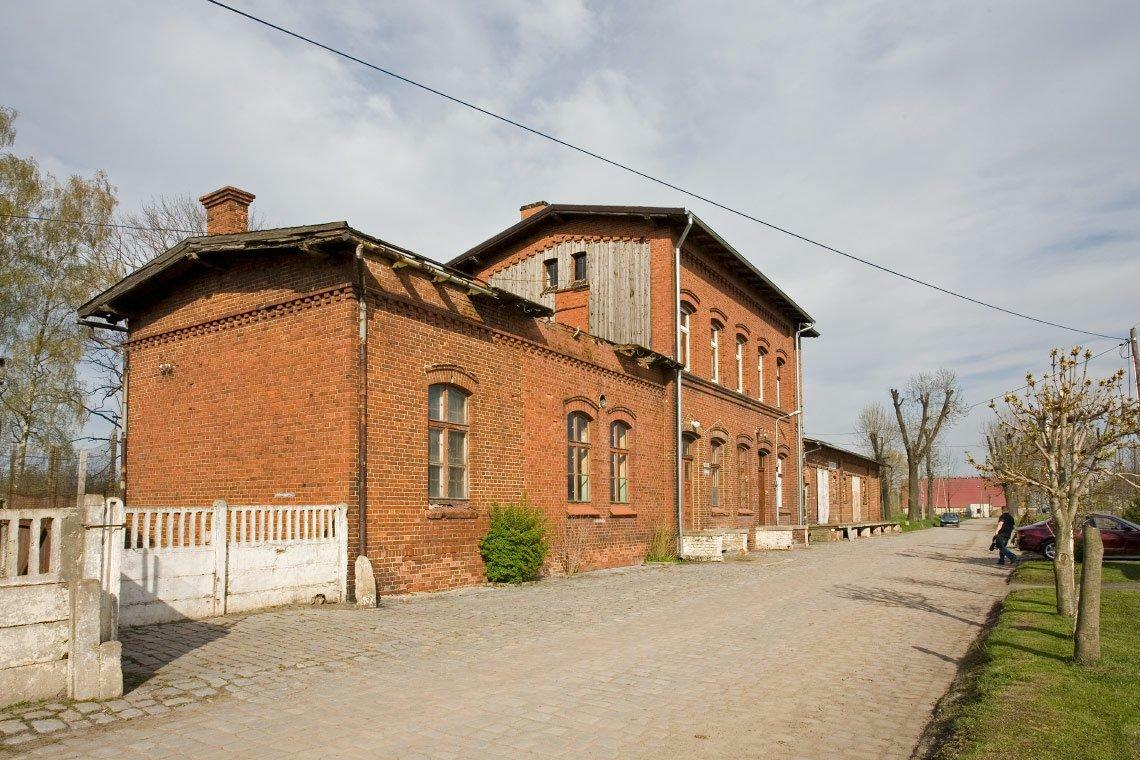
- Train station

- Location within Poland
- Coordinates: 50°46′26″N 16°56′07″E
- Country: Poland
- Voivodeship: Lower Silesian
- County: Strzelin
- Gmina: Kondratowice

Population
  - Total: 820

Kondratowice [kɔndratɔˈvit͡sɛ] is a village in Strzelin County, Lower Silesian Voivodeship, in south-western Poland. It is the seat of the administrative district (gmina) called Gmina Kondratowice.
