= Lipowa, Lower Silesian Voivodeship =

Lipowa
- Village
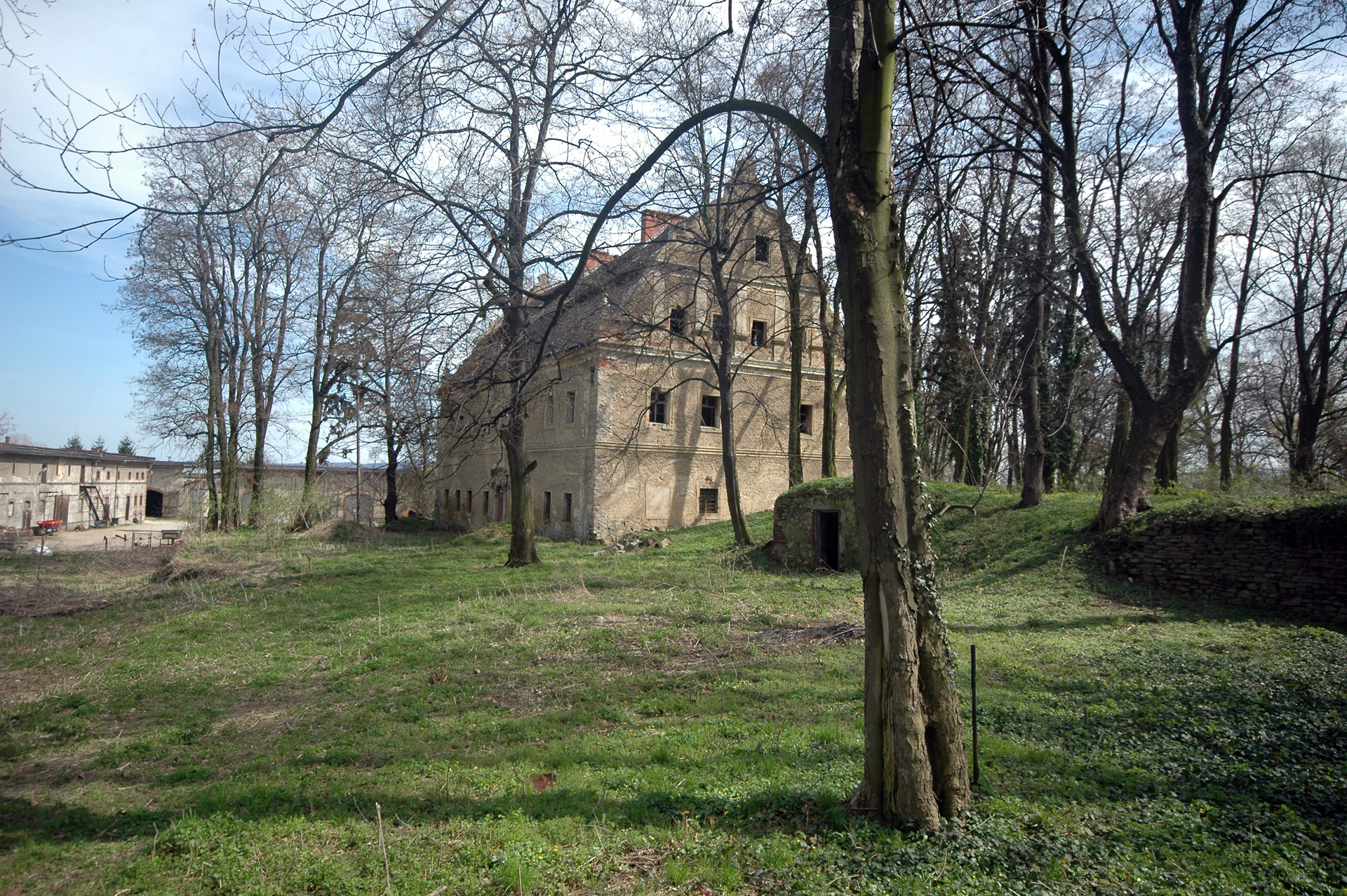
- Palace

- Location within Poland
- Coordinates: 50°44′N 17°0′E
- Country: Poland
- Voivodeship: Lower Silesian
- County: Strzelin
- Gmina: Kondratowice

Lipowa [liˈpɔva] is a village in the administrative district of Gmina Kondratowice, within Strzelin County, Lower Silesian Voivodeship, in south-western Poland.
