= Skała, Strzelin County =

Skała
- Village
- Location within Poland
- Coordinates: 50°44′40″N 16°59′17″E
- Country: Poland
- Voivodeship: Lower Silesian
- County: Strzelin
- Gmina: Kondratowice

Skała [ˈskawa] (German: Skalitz) is a village in the administrative district of Gmina Kondratowice, within Strzelin County, Lower Silesian Voivodeship, in south-western Poland.
