= Komorowice, Strzelin County =

Komorowice
- Village
- Location within Poland
- Coordinates: 50°43′02″N 16°59′07″E
- Country: Poland
- Voivodeship: Lower Silesian
- County: Strzelin
- Gmina: Kondratowice
- Elevation: 210 m (690 ft)

Komorowice [kɔmɔrɔˈvit͡sɛ] is a village in the administrative district of Gmina Kondratowice, within Strzelin County, Lower Silesian Voivodeship, in south-western Poland.
