= Zarzyca =

- Village
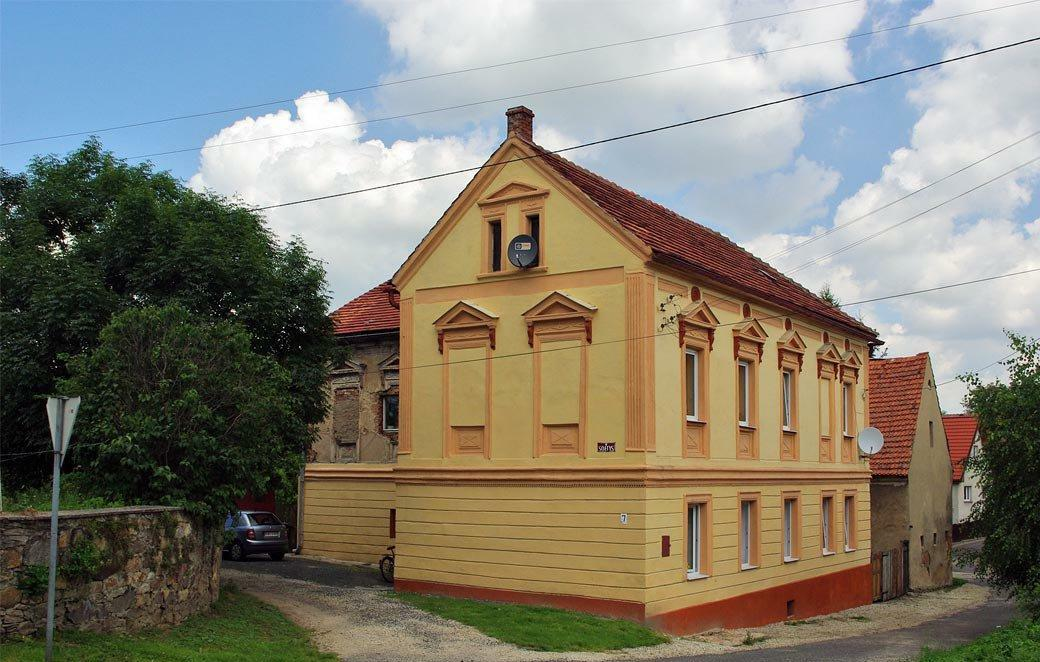

- Location within Poland
- Coordinates: 50°43′N 16°57′E
- Country: Poland
- Voivodeship: Lower Silesian
- County: Strzelin
- Gmina: Kondratowice

Zarzyca [zaˈʐɨt͡sa] is a village in the administrative district of Gmina Kondratowice, within Strzelin County, Lower Silesian Voivodeship, in south-western Poland.
