= Grzegorzów, Strzelin County =

Grzegorzów
- Village
- Location within Poland
- Coordinates: 50°49′03″N 16°57′55″E
- Country: Poland
- Voivodeship: Lower Silesian
- County: Strzelin
- Gmina: Kondratowice

Grzegorzów [ɡʐɛˈɡɔʐuf] is a village in the administrative district of Gmina Kondratowice, within Strzelin County, Lower Silesian Voivodeship, in south-western Poland.
