= Janowiczki, Lower Silesian Voivodeship =

Janowiczki
- Village
- Location within Poland
- Coordinates: 50°44′17″N 16°56′37″E
- Country: Poland
- Voivodeship: Lower Silesian
- County: Strzelin
- Gmina: Kondratowice

Janowiczki [janɔˈvit͡ʂki] is a village in the administrative district of Gmina Kondratowice, within Strzelin County, Lower Silesian Voivodeship, in south-western Poland.
