= Karczyn, Lower Silesian Voivodeship =

Karczyn
- Village
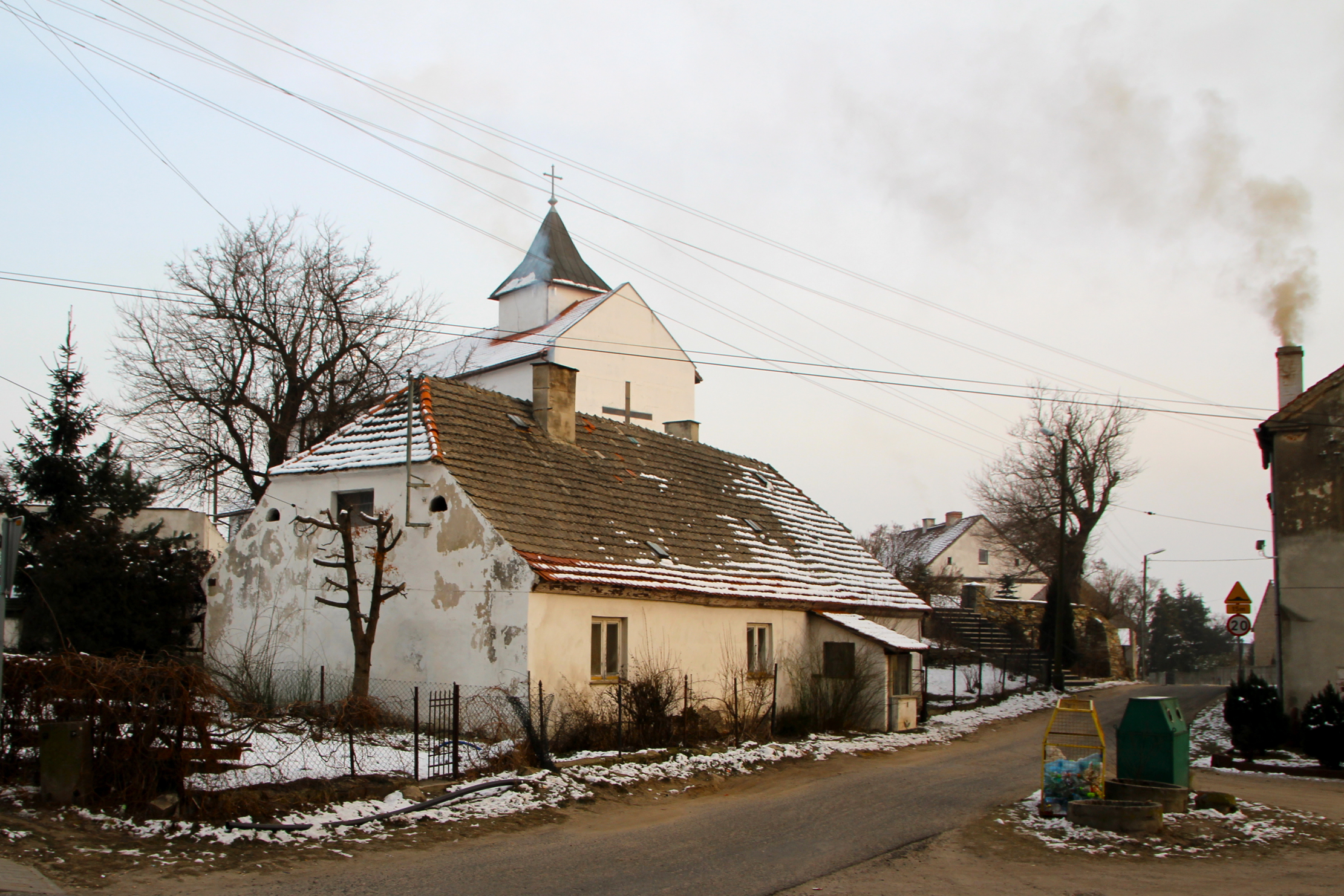

- Location within Poland
- Coordinates: 50°47′59″N 16°56′07″E
- Country: Poland
- Voivodeship: Lower Silesian
- County: Strzelin
- Gmina: Kondratowice

Karczyn [ˈkart͡ʂɨn] is a village in the administrative district of Gmina Kondratowice, within Strzelin County, Lower Silesian Voivodeship, in south-western Poland.
