= Gmina Kondratowice =

Gmina Kondratowice Kondratowice Commune
- Gmina
- Coat of arms
- Interactive map of Gmina Kondratowice
- Coordinates (Kondratowice): 50°46′26″N 16°56′07″E
- Country: Poland
- Voivodeship: Lower Silesian
- County: Strzelin
- Seat: Kondratowice
- Sołectwos: Błotnica, Czerwieniec, Gołostowice, Górka Sobocka, Grzegorzów, Janowiczki, Karczyn, Komorowice, Kondratowice, Księginice Wielkie, Lipowa, Maleszów, Podgaj, Prusy, Rakowice, Strachów, Zarzyca, Żelowice

Area
  - Total: 98.14 km^{2} (37.89 sq mi)

Population (2019-06-30)
  - Total: 4,292
  - Density: 43.73/km^{2} (113.3/sq mi)
- Website: http://kondratowice.pl

Gmina Kondratowice is a rural gmina (administrative district) in Strzelin County, Lower Silesian Voivodeship, in south-western Poland. Its seat is the village of Kondratowice, which lies approximately 10 kilometres (6 mi) west of Strzelin, and 40 kilometres (25 mi) south of the regional capital Wrocław.

The gmina covers an area of 98.14 square kilometres (37.9 sq mi), and as of 2019 its total population is 4,292.

== Neighbouring gminas ==
Gmina Kondratowice is bordered by the gminas of Borów, Ciepłowody, Jordanów Śląski, Łagiewniki, Niemcza and Strzelin.

== Villages ==
The gmina contains the villages of Białobrzezie, Błotnica, Brochocinek, Czerwieniec, Edwardów, Gołostowice, Górka Sobocka, Grzegorzów, Janowiczki, Jezierzyce Małe, Karczyn, Komorowice, Kondratowice, Kowalskie, Księginice Wielkie, Lipowa, Maleszów, Podgaj, Prusy, Rakowice, Sadowice, Skała, Stachów, Strachów, Wójcin, Zarzyca and Żelowice.

== Twin towns – sister cities ==
Gmina Kondratowice is twinned with:

- Častolovice, Czech Republic
- Jablonné nad Orlicí, Czech Republic
