= Johann Adam Steinmetz =

German pastor (1689–1762)

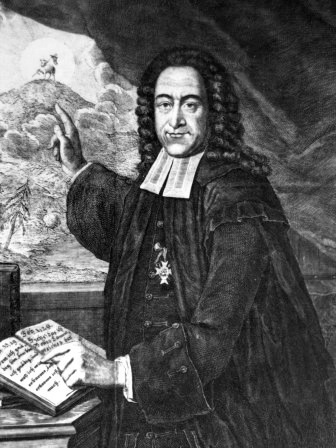
Johann Adam Steinmetz

Johann Adam Steinmetz (24 September 1689 in Großkniegnitz – 10 July 1762 in Prester, Magdeburg) was a German Lutheran pastor, Pietist, educator and one of the most significant revivalists in 18th century Europe.

After studies he worked as a pastor in Töppliwoda and later (1720–1730) he served a congregation in Teschen. “Jesus Church” in Teschen was of unique importance – it was visited by crowds from the Upper Silesia and by many secret Protestants from northern Moravia; services were held in Polish, German and Czech.

Remnants of the Bohemian Brethren visited Steinmetz and he mentored and counseled them, thus preparing the revival among them. Steinmetz's role in the renewal of the Moravian Church is praised in Zinzendorf's Memoirs and he is considered to be the leader of the revival in Moravia according to an inscription in the Deaths Register of Bethlehem.

Pastor Steinmetz was a patron of a Lutheran school in Teschen. Due to his versatile service in the pietistic spirit, Steinmetz was hated by the Catholic clergy and Emperor Charles VI finally expelled him from all Habsburg lands in 1730. He went to Neustadt an der Aisch and later to the area around town Magdeburg, where he led excellent school in the former monastery Berga.

Steinmetz was in touch with Wesley and the American revivalists. He translated works of Jonathan Edwards and Philip Doddridge into German.

== Literature ==
- Veronika Albrecht-Birkner: Steinmetz, Johann Adam. Religion in Geschichte und Gegenwart, Band 7. 4. Aufl. Tübingen, Mohr Siebeck, 2004, S. 1703–1704.
- Claus Bernet (2003). "Johann Adam Steinmetz". In Bautz, Traugott (ed.). Biographisch-Bibliographisches Kirchenlexikon (BBKL) (in German). Vol. 22. Nordhausen: Bautz. cols. 1307–1322. ISBN 3-88309-133-2.
