= Górka Sobocka =

- Village
- Location within Poland
- Coordinates: 50°44′50″N 16°57′31″E
- Country: Poland
- Voivodeship: Lower Silesian
- County: Strzelin
- Gmina: Kondratowice

Górka Sobocka [ˈɡurka sɔˈbɔt͡ska] is a village in the administrative district of Gmina Kondratowice, within Strzelin County, Lower Silesian Voivodeship, in south-western Poland.
