= Jezierzyce Małe =

- Village
- Location within Poland
- Coordinates: 50°49′40″N 16°55′30″E
- Country: Poland
- Voivodeship: Lower Silesian
- County: Strzelin
- Gmina: Kondratowice

Jezierzyce Małe [jɛʑɛˈʐɨt͡sɛ ˈmawɛ] is a village in the administrative district of Gmina Kondratowice, within Strzelin County, Lower Silesian Voivodeship, in south-western Poland.
