= Prusy, Lower Silesian Voivodeship =

Prusy
- Village
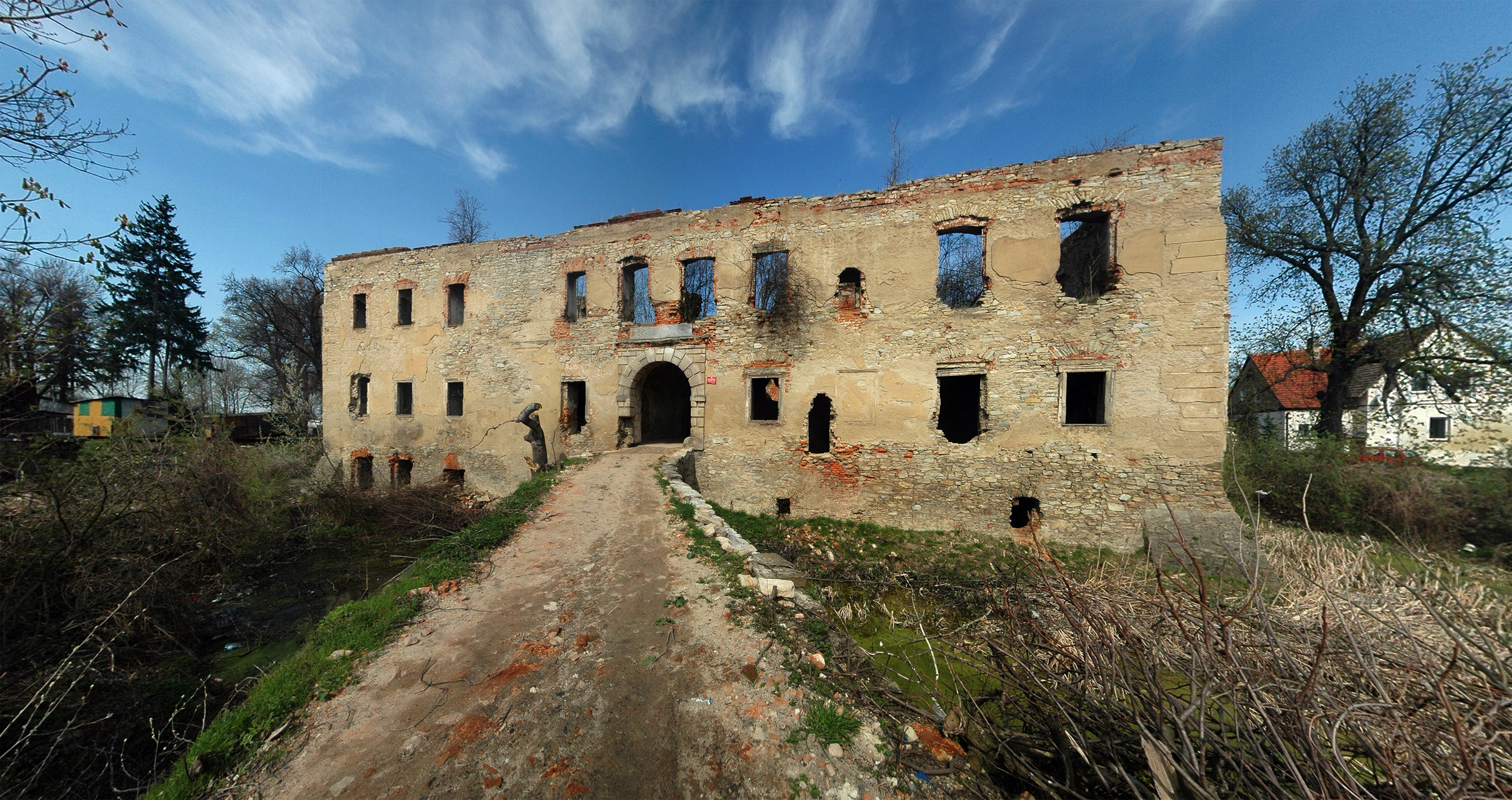
- Ruins of the manor

- Location within Poland
- Coordinates: 50°45′N 16°56′E
- Country: Poland
- Voivodeship: Lower Silesian
- County: Strzelin
- Gmina: Kondratowice

Prusy [ˈprusɨ] is a village in the administrative district of Gmina Kondratowice, within Strzelin County, Lower Silesian Voivodeship, in south-western Poland.

== People ==
- Manfred Geisler, German footballer
