= Podgaj, Lower Silesian Voivodeship =

Podgaj
- Village
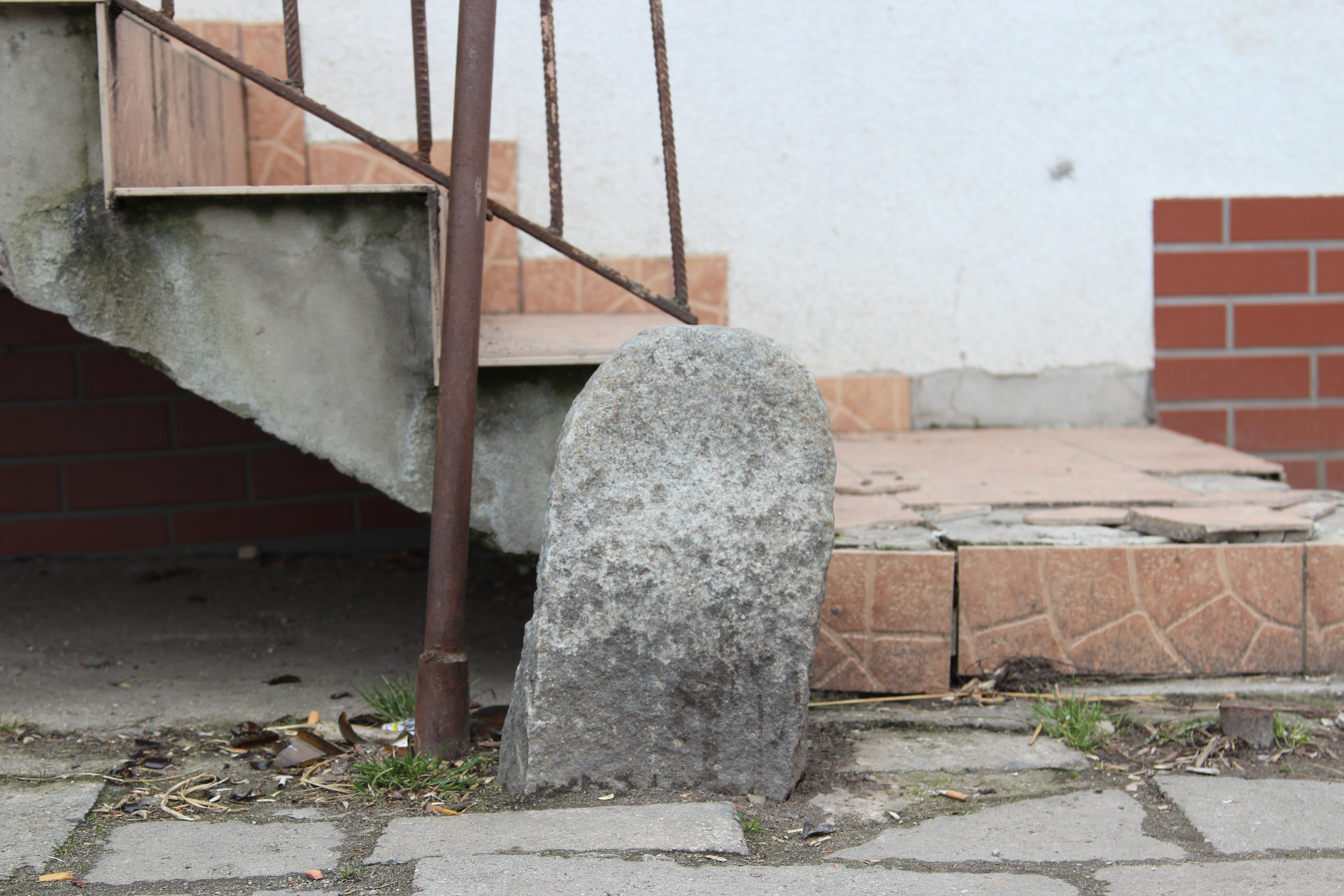
- Stone cross

- Location within Poland
- Coordinates: 50°49′21″N 16°56′29″E
- Country: Poland
- Voivodeship: Lower Silesian
- County: Strzelin
- Gmina: Kondratowice
- Population: 170

Podgaj [ˈpɔdɡai̯] is a village in the administrative district of Gmina Kondratowice, within Strzelin County, Lower Silesian Voivodeship, in south-western Poland.
