= Rakowice, Strzelin County =

Rakowice
- Village
- Location within Poland
- Coordinates: 50°45′34″N 16°55′07″E
- Country: Poland
- Voivodeship: Lower Silesian
- County: Strzelin
- Gmina: Kondratowice

Rakowice [rakɔˈvit͡sɛ] is a village in the administrative district of Gmina Kondratowice, within Strzelin County, Lower Silesian Voivodeship, in south-western Poland.
