= Jesus Church, Cieszyn =

Church in Cieszyn, Poland

Jesus Church
- Kościół Jezusowy
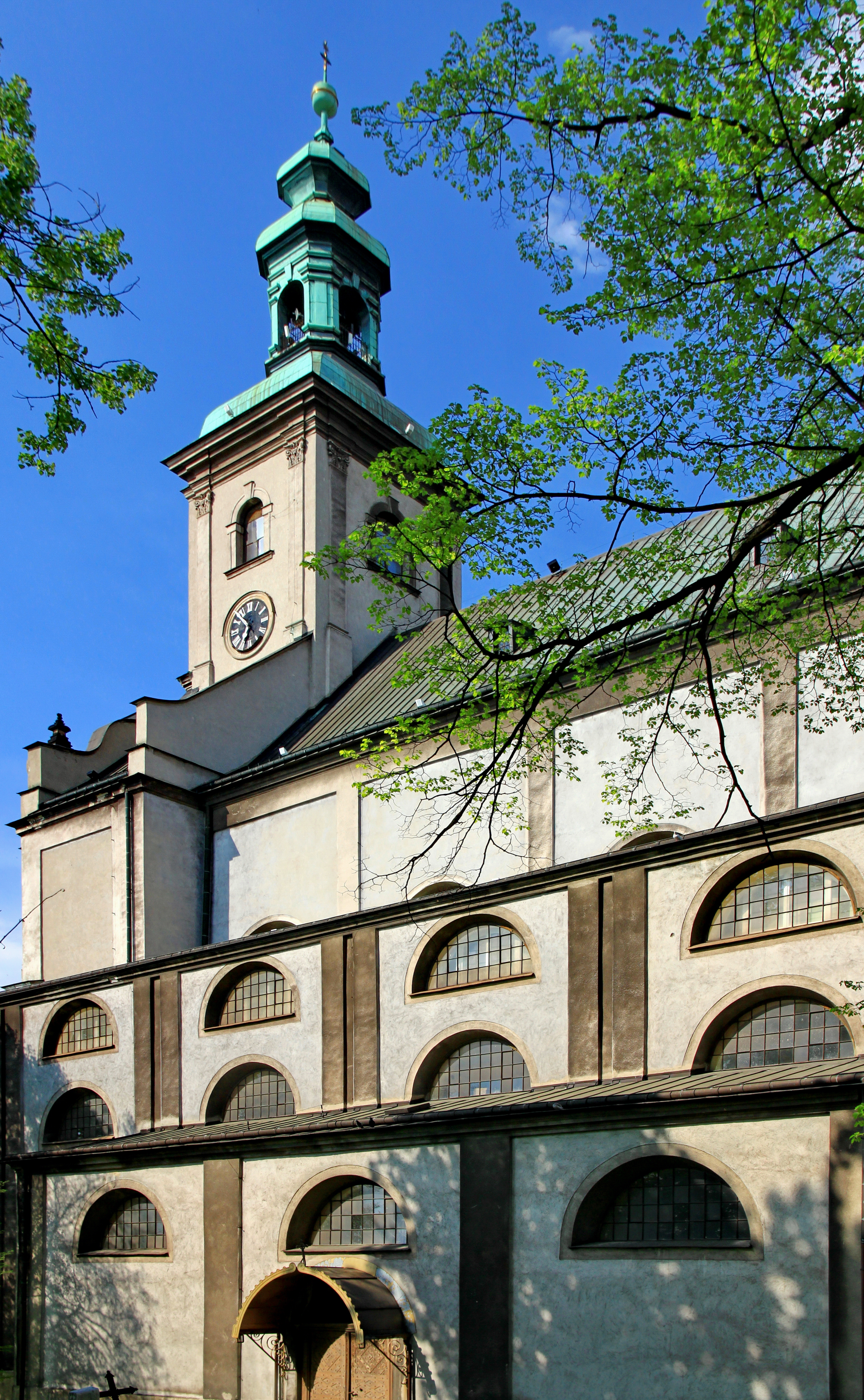
- Jesus Church

Religion
- Affiliation: Lutheran
- District: Diocese of Cieszyn
- Ecclesiastical or organizational status: Active

Location
- Location: Cieszyn, Poland
- Interactive map of Jesus Church
- Coordinates: 49.744902°N 18.636749°E

Architecture
- Architect: Jan Haüsrucker
- Type: Church
- Style: Baroque
- Completed: 1750

Specifications
- Capacity: 3,500
- Length: 54 m
- Width: 38 m
- Height (max): 72 m (236 ft)
- Materials: Bricks

Jesus Church (Polish: Kościół Jezusowy) or Grace Church is a Lutheran Church located in Cieszyn, Poland. It is one of the largest and most important Protestant churches in Poland.

The construction of the Lutheran basilica was made possible with the assistance of Sweden's Charles XII, who forced Austrian Emperor Joseph I to provide right for Protestants. Late Austrian Baroque in style, Jesus Church was constructed between 1709 1710 and between 1750 the bell tower was built . In the first two decades of the church's existence, it was a significant center of pietism.

The church has a capacity of 6000 people (sitting on benches) and a lot of standing places if necessary. The Church also houses the Protestant Museum altogether with Tschammer Library which has about 23 000 books in its collection.

On 12 October 2008, President of Poland Lech Kaczyński visited Lutheran Jesus Church in Cieszyn, becoming the first Polish president who had visited a Protestant place of worship in Poland.

== See also ==
- Evangelical-Augsburg Church in Poland
- Johann Adam Steinmetz
- Holy Trinity Church, Warsaw
