= Księginice Wielkie =

- Village
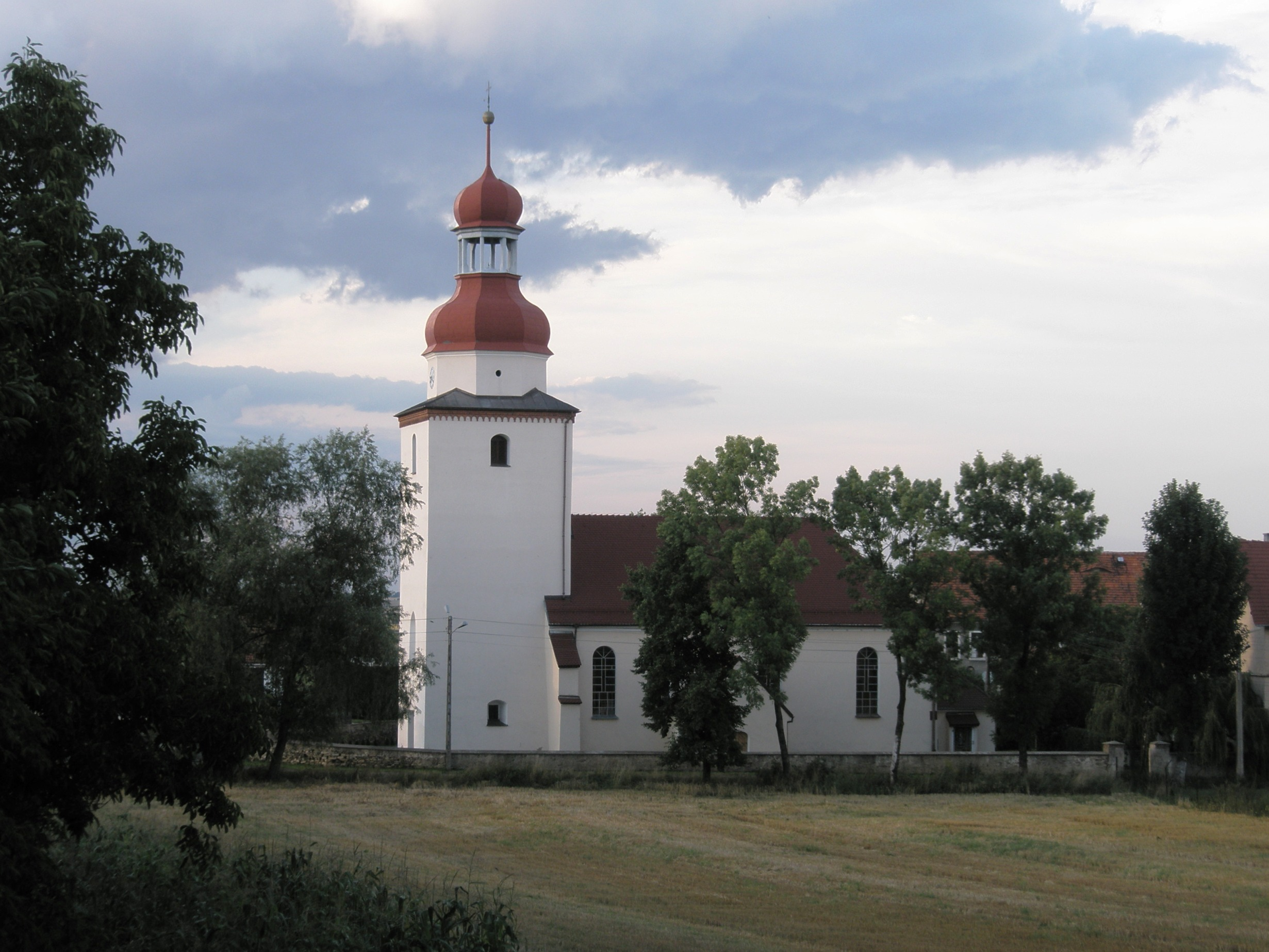
- Catholic church

- Location within Poland
- Coordinates: 50°45′33″N 16°54′01″E
- Country: Poland
- Voivodeship: Lower Silesian
- County: Strzelin
- Gmina: Kondratowice
- Population (2006): 590

Księginice Wielkie [kɕɛnɡiˈnit͡sɛ ˈvjɛlkʲɛ] is a village in the administrative district of Gmina Kondratowice, within Strzelin County, Lower Silesian Voivodeship, in south-western Poland.

== History ==
After the region had been placed under Polish rule, Germans wered ordered to show up for eviction at 5 am on April 17, 1946.

== People ==
- Johann Adam Steinmetz
