= Wójcin, Lower Silesian Voivodeship =

Wójcin
- Village
- Location within Poland
- Coordinates: 50°43′09″N 16°55′23″E
- Country: Poland
- Voivodeship: Lower Silesian
- County: Strzelin
- Gmina: Kondratowice
- Time zone: UTC+1 (CET)
  - Summer (DST): UTC+2 (CEST)
- Vehicle registration: DST

Wójcin [ˈvui̯t͡ɕin] is a settlement, part of the village of Błotnica, in the administrative district of Gmina Kondratowice, within Strzelin County, Lower Silesian Voivodeship, in south-western Poland.
