= Rudolf von Stillfried-Rattonitz =

Rudolf von Stillfried-Rattoniz
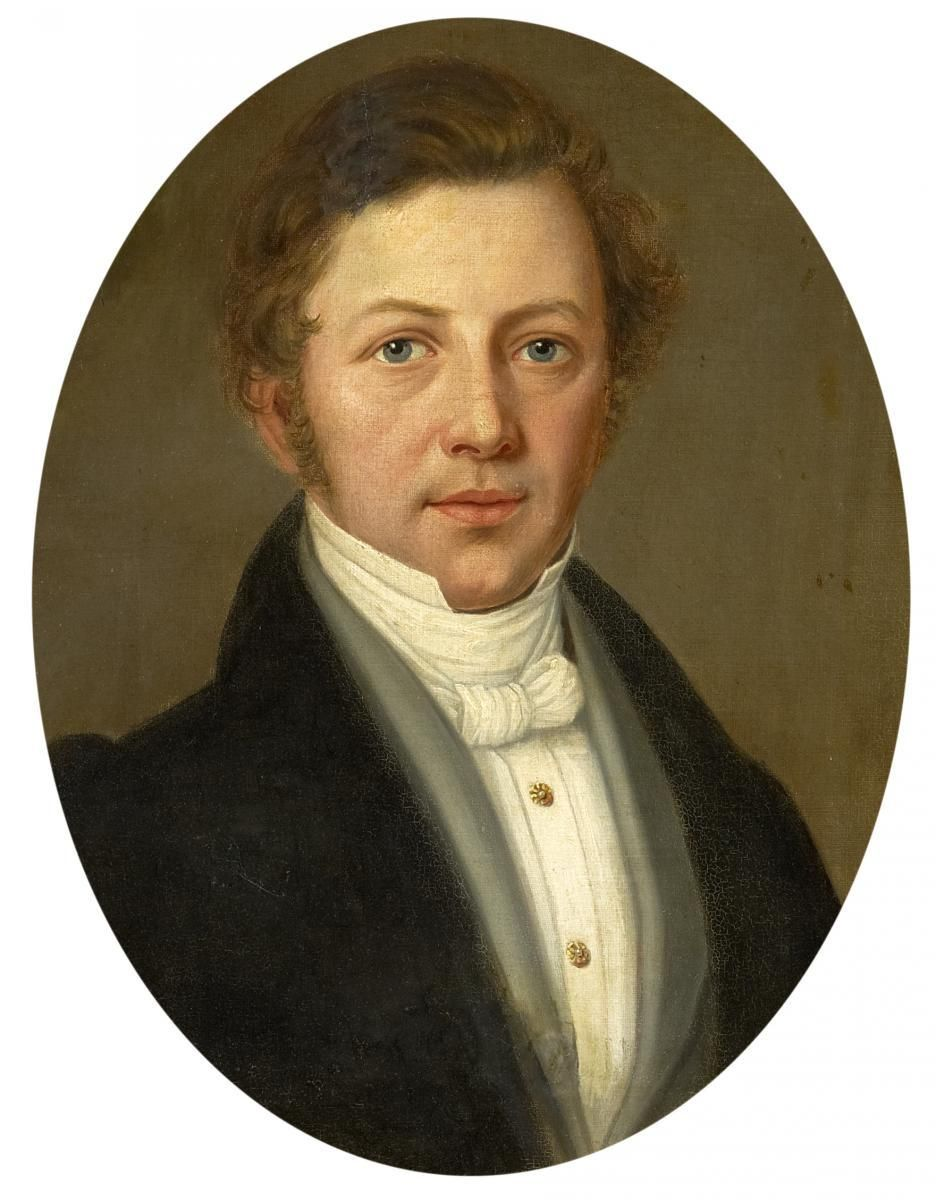
- Born: 14 August 1804; Hirschberg, Prussia
- Died: 4 August 1882 (aged 77); Silbitz, Silesia, Prussia
- Education: University of Breslau
- Occupations: Historian, heraldist
- Title: Count of Alcantra
- Parents: Karl Maria Ignaz von Stillfried-Rattonitz; Theresia von Rottenberg-Endersdorf

Rudolf Maria Bernhard von Stillfried-Rattonitz (14 August 1804 – 9 August 1882) was a German historian and heraldist, the Prussian Master of Ceremonies from 1843 until 1853, the Prussian Chief Master of Ceremonies since 1853, and the Count of Alcántara from 1858.

== Life and career ==
Stillfried was born in Hirschberg, Prussia, and came from the Bohemian noble family of Stillfried-Rattonitz. After attending the Matthias Gymnasium in Breslau, he went to the Liegnitz Knights' Academy in 1819, and later attended a Catholic school in Koblenz. In 1824, he entered the University of Breslau to study law, although he later abandoned his university studies in 1830.

Stillfried was appointed Master of Ceremonies by Frederick William IV in 1843. He was also commissioned with writing multiple texts on the history of the Prussian royal house, including the Antiquities and Art Monuments of the House of Hohenzollern and the Monumenta Zollerana. From 1853, he held the office of Chief Master of Ceremonies.

In 1859, Stillfried was appointed as Minister-Commissioner to accompany Stefanie von Hohenzollern and her brother Leopold to Lisbon, where Stefanie married to King Peter V of Portugal. Stillfried was later given the title of Count of Alcántara.

In 1861, Stillfried organized the coronation ceremonies of Wilhelm I, and became a Prussian count in the same year. In 1879, he was made a knight of the Order of the Black Eagle.

== Notable works ==
=== Monumenta Zollerana ===
The Monumenta Zollerana was a book on the history of the House of Hohenzollern, written by Stillfried and Traugott Märcker in 1843. In the 1830s, Stillfried had been tasked with researching the history of the House of Hohenzollern, along with acquiring the various documents, charters, and sources relating to the House of Hohenzollern. This resulted in the Monumenta Zollerana, which contains the many documents and charters of the House of Hohenzollern.

=== Standard of the German Emperor ===
Originally, the standard of the German Emperor had royal purple (red) field, on the advice of the then Crown Prince Frederick III. Stillfried argued that yellow was more precious of a color than royal purple, and as such, the standard of the German Emperor should have a yellow field. German Emperor Wilhelm I conceded to his opinion, and a new version of the standard was adopted, now with a yellow background.

The original Standard of the German Emperor with a royal purple (red) background, used for around two months.

The Standard of the German Emperor used from 1871 until 1888, now with a golden (yellow) background.
