= Kowalskie, Lower Silesian Voivodeship =

Kowalskie
- Village
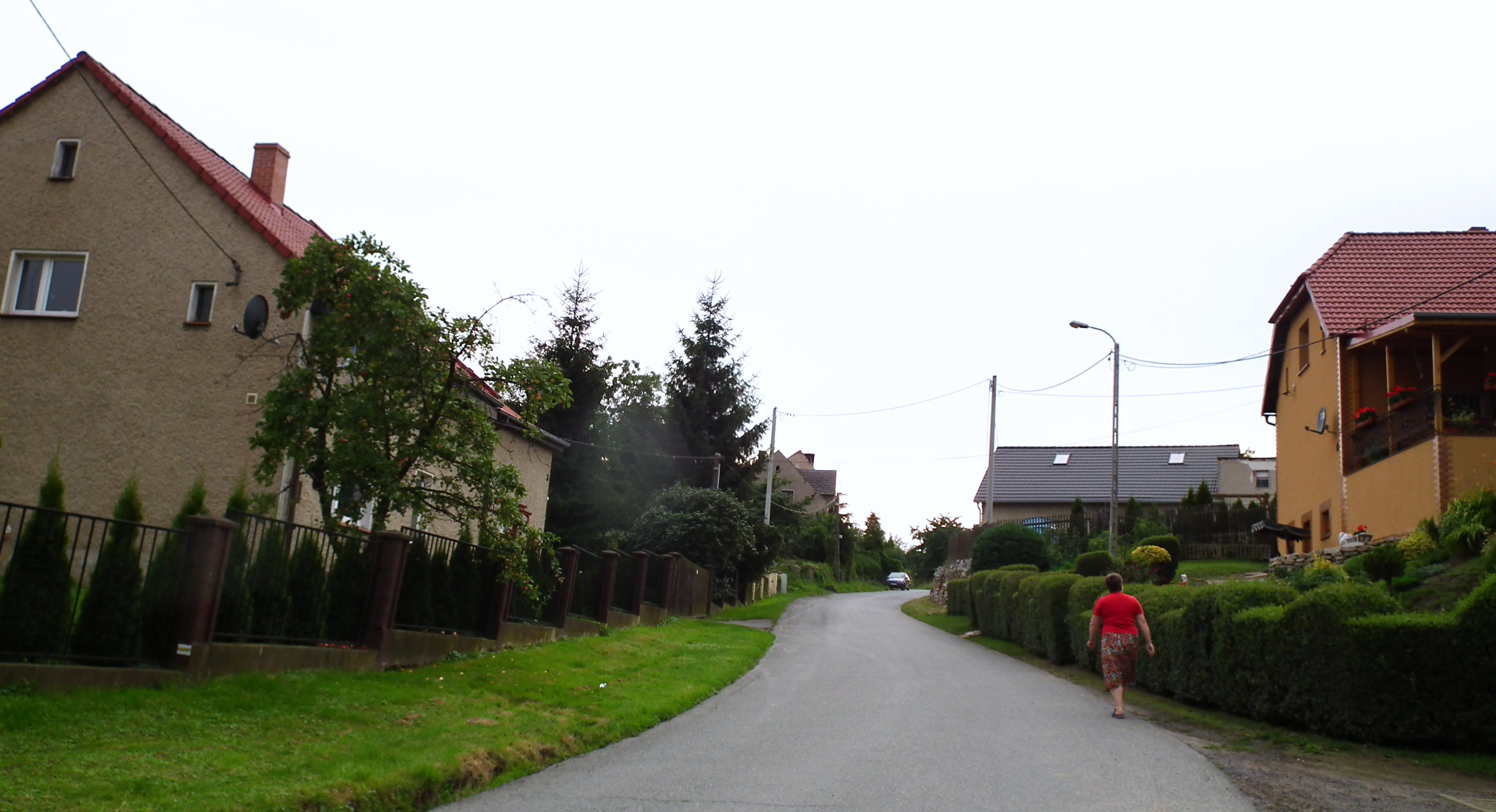
- Wayside houses in Kowalskie

- Location within Poland
- Coordinates: 50°43′50″N 16°54′59″E
- Country: Poland
- Voivodeship: Lower Silesian
- County: Strzelin
- Gmina: Kondratowice

Kowalskie [kɔˈvalskʲɛ] is a village in the administrative district of Gmina Kondratowice, within Strzelin County, Lower Silesian Voivodeship, in south-western Poland.
