= Błotnica, Strzelin County =

Błotnica
- Village
- Location within Poland
- Coordinates: 50°42′43″N 16°54′30″E
- Country: Poland
- Voivodeship: Lower Silesian
- County: Strzelin
- Gmina: Kondratowice

Błotnica [bwɔtˈnit͡sa] is a village in the administrative district of Gmina Kondratowice, within Strzelin County, Lower Silesian Voivodeship, in south-western Poland.
