= Czerwieniec, Lower Silesian Voivodeship =

Wioska Cupka
- Village
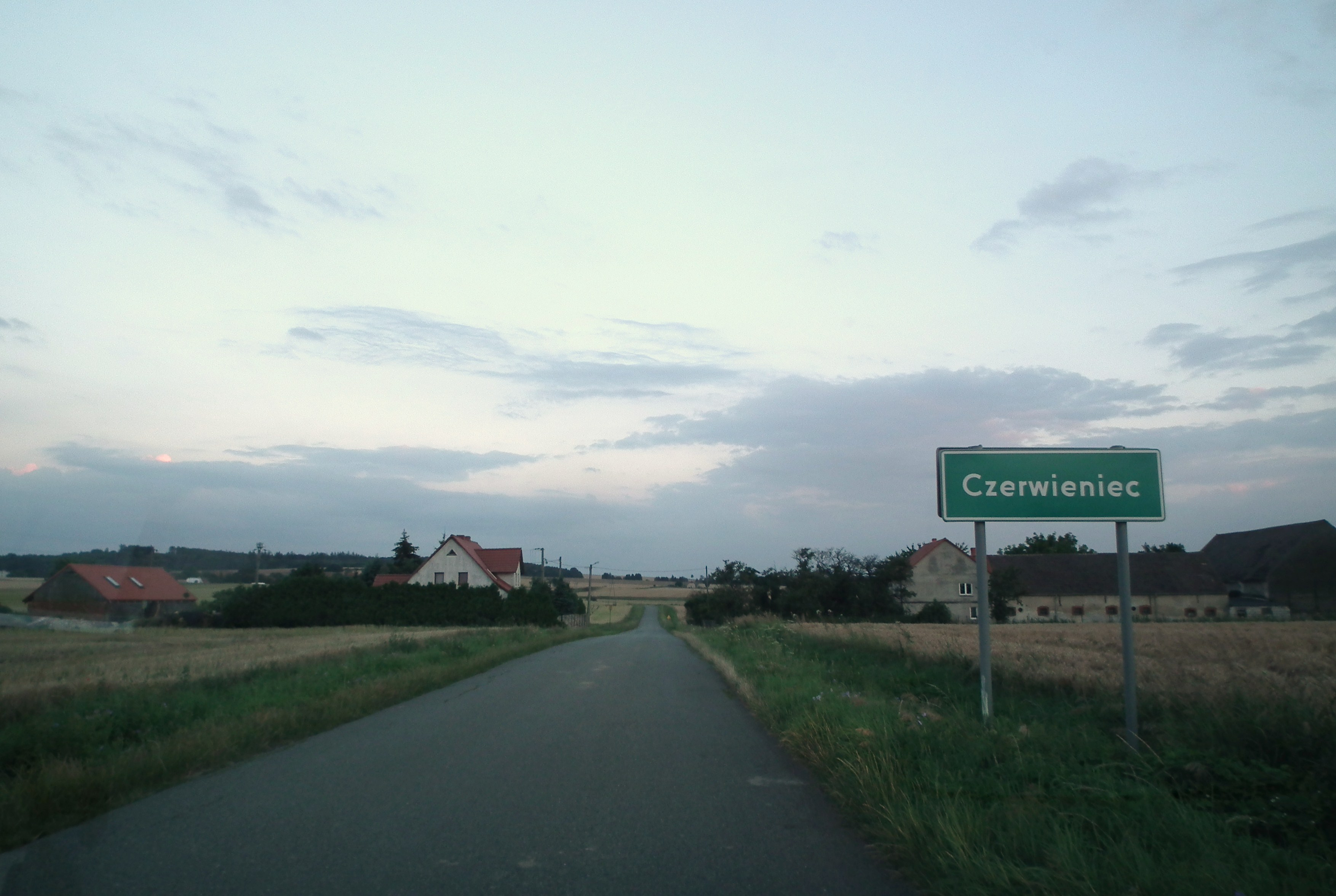

- Location within Poland
- Coordinates: 50°43′22″N 16°56′56″E
- Country: Poland
- Voivodeship: Lower Silesian
- County: Strzelin
- Gmina: Kondratowice

Czerwieniec [t͡ʂɛrˈvjɛɲɛt͡s] is a village in the administrative district of Gmina Kondratowice, within Strzelin County, Lower Silesian Voivodeship, in south-western Poland.
