= Luize Valente =

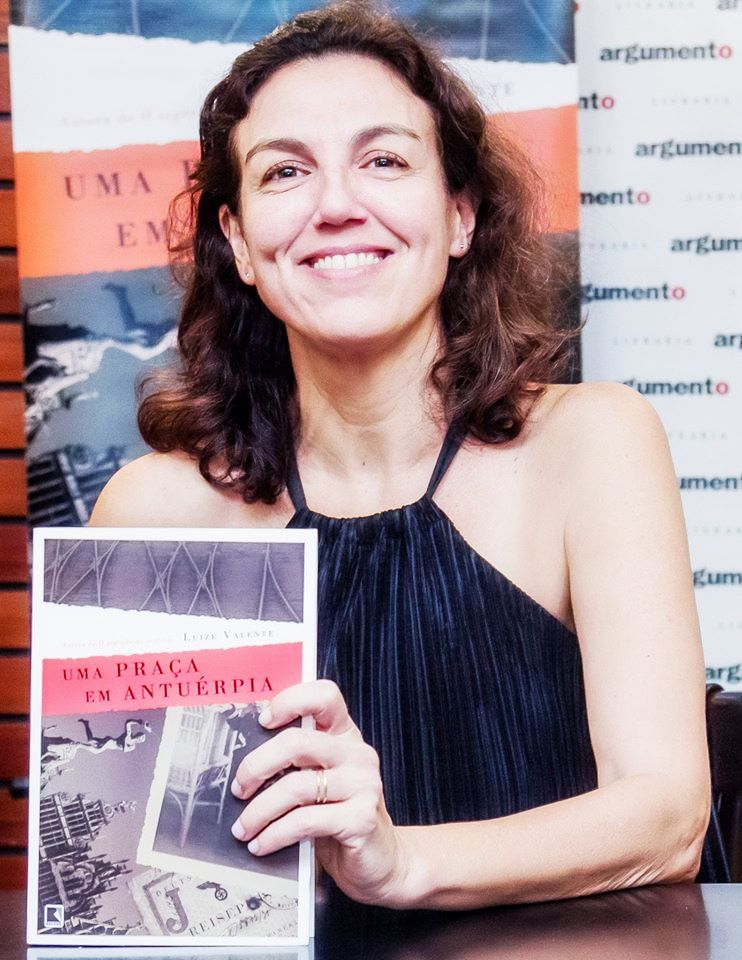
- Luize Valente in 2015 with her book Uma Praça em Antuérpia (A Square in Antwerp)
- Born: Luize Mendes Pinheiro Valente; January 24, 1966 (age 60); Rio de Janeiro, Brazil
- Occupations: Writer, documentary filmmaker
- Writing career
- Language: Portuguese
- Genres: Historical fiction, documentary
- Subjects: World History, Jewish History
- Notable works: Sonata in Auschwitz, A Square in Antwerp, The Secret of the Shrine
- Notable awards: Finalist of the São Paulo Prize for Literature with the novel The Secret of the Shrine (2013); Best Documentary Award at the Jewish Film Festival of São Paulo with The Star Hidden in the Backlands (2005)
- Website: LuizeValente.com

Luize Valente, born in Rio de Janeiro, Brazil, of Portuguese and German origins, is a writer and documentary filmmaker, author of historical novels and awarded documentaries, and a journalist.

== Biography ==
Valente has been thoroughly studying Jewish history and war refugees' lives. She graduated in journalism, with a postgraduate degree in Brazilian literature. With this background, she began writing works of historical fiction.

After some important works in the documentary and journalistic fields, she put her extensive research to the service of the novelist.

In 2012, Valente thus plunged into the fictional writing, publishing her first novel, The Secret of the Shrine (O Segredo do Oratório), by Editora Record, which ended up as a finalist of the São Paulo Literature Prize in 2013. The novel was translated and published in the Netherlands by Nieuw Amsterdam with the title De sleutel tot het familiegeheim (2013). It is a historical fiction that reveals Brazilian's Jewish roots through the saga of a "New Christian" family that crosses three centuries.

In 2015, she released her second novel, A Square in Antwerp (Uma Praça em Antuérpia), also published by Record. It also reached the other side of the Atlantic: the Portuguese version was published by Saída de Emergência.

In 2016, Valente wrote the play The Indecipherable World (O Mundo Indecifrável).

In 2017, she published her third novel, Sonata in Auschwitz (Sonata em Auschwitz), also published by Record in Brazil and by Saída de Emergência in Portugal.

The film and TV rights of her first two novels, The Secret of the Shrine and A Square in Antwerp, were acquired in 2017 by the Brazilian producers Breno Silveira (Conspiração / director of Fox series One Against All) and Paula Fiuza (Canal Laranja).

In the nonfiction field, she partnered with photographer Elaine Eiger to write the book Israel: Routes and Roots (Israel: Rotas e Raízes) in 1999. This partnership also produced the documentaries Paths of Memory: The Trajectory of the Jews in Portugal (Caminhos da Memória: A Trajetória dos Judeus em Portugal) in 2002 and The Star Hidden in the Backlands (A Estrela Oculta do Sertão) in 2005, both exhibited in various festivals in Brazil and abroad – Lincoln Center, Festivals of San Diego, Jerusalem, among others – and on TV, constituting important archives of Judaism history in the world. The first documentary won the Best Documentary Direction Award at the New York Independent Film Festival in 2003 and the second one won the Best Documentary Award at the Jewish Film Festival of São Paulo in 2005.

As a journalist, Valente has worked for more than two decades on television covering international affairs, on Globo broadcast network. Her journalistic background and experience is the root of the trademark of her work, the richness of research in loco: Luize writes her novels always after a field research trip and a reconstitution of the characters' journeys.

== Books ==
- Sonata in Auschwitz | Historical fiction (Editora Record, Brazil, 2017 / Saída de Emergência, Portugal, 2018)
- A Square in Antwerp | Historical fiction (Editora Record, Brazil, 2015 / Saída de Emergência, Portugal, 2015)
- The Secret of the Shrine | Historical fiction (Editora Record, Brazil, 2012 / Nieuw Amsterdam, the Netherlands, 2013)
- Israel: Routes & Roots with Elaine Eiger (Fototema, Brazil, 1999)

== Documentaries ==
- The Star Hidden in the Backlands with Elaine Eiger (Brazil, 2005)
- Paths of Memory: The Trajectory of the Jews in Portugal with Elaine Eiger (Brazil, 2002)
