= Stachów =

- Village
- Location within Poland
- Coordinates: 50°43′N 16°59′E
- Country: Poland
- Voivodeship: Lower Silesian
- County: Strzelin
- Gmina: Kondratowice

Stachów [ˈstaxuf] (German: Stachau) is a village in the administrative district of Gmina Kondratowice, within Strzelin County, Lower Silesian Voivodeship, in south-western Poland.
