= Żelowice =

- Village
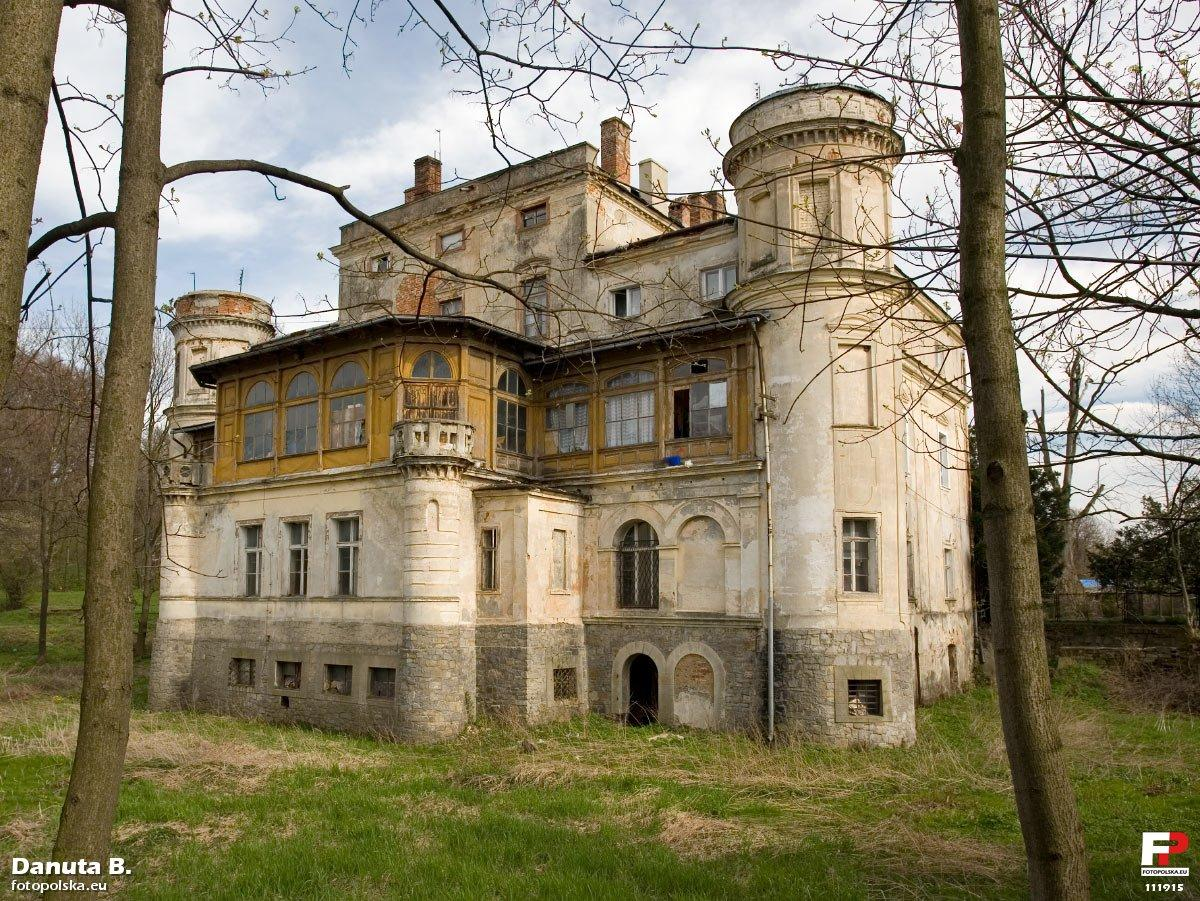
- Palace

- Location within Poland
- Coordinates: 50°43′32″N 16°54′28″E
- Country: Poland
- Voivodeship: Lower Silesian
- County: Strzelin
- Gmina: Kondratowice
- Population: 310

Żelowice [ʐɛlɔˈvit͡sɛ] is a village in the administrative district of Gmina Kondratowice, within Strzelin County, Lower Silesian Voivodeship, in south-western Poland.
