= Wendish Crown =

German heraldic symbol

Drawing of the Wendish Crown

The Wendish Crown (German: Wendische Krone or Wendenkrone) is a heraldic symbol in form of a crown, from the region of Mecklenburg in Germany. It is an example of invented tradition. The myth is based on three archaeological finds which in reality were neither Wendish nor crowns, but Germanic bronze and copper circlets from around 300 BC. The first circlet was found in 1823 in Langen Trechow, the second in 1843 near Admannshagen, and the third in 1849 near Lübtheen. The circlets were attributed to the Wends because of the omnipresent Wendish/Slavic past of Mecklenburg and the House of Mecklenburg, a dynasty of Slavic origin.

== In heraldry ==
A golden Wendish crown was a symbol used by the rulers of Mecklenburg, including the Grand Duchy of Mecklenburg-Schwerin and the Grand Duchy of Mecklenburg-Strelitz. It was present in their coats of arms, medals and decorations, and additionally, was used as an ornament in the interiors of palaces and castles. It is also present in the design of the Cross of Frederick Francis and the House Order of the Wendish Crown.

== Image gallery ==
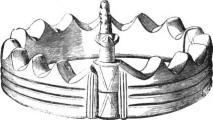
One of the original Wendish Crowns, a bronze ring from c. 300 BC, found in 1823 in Bernitt-Langen Trechow southwest of Rostock.

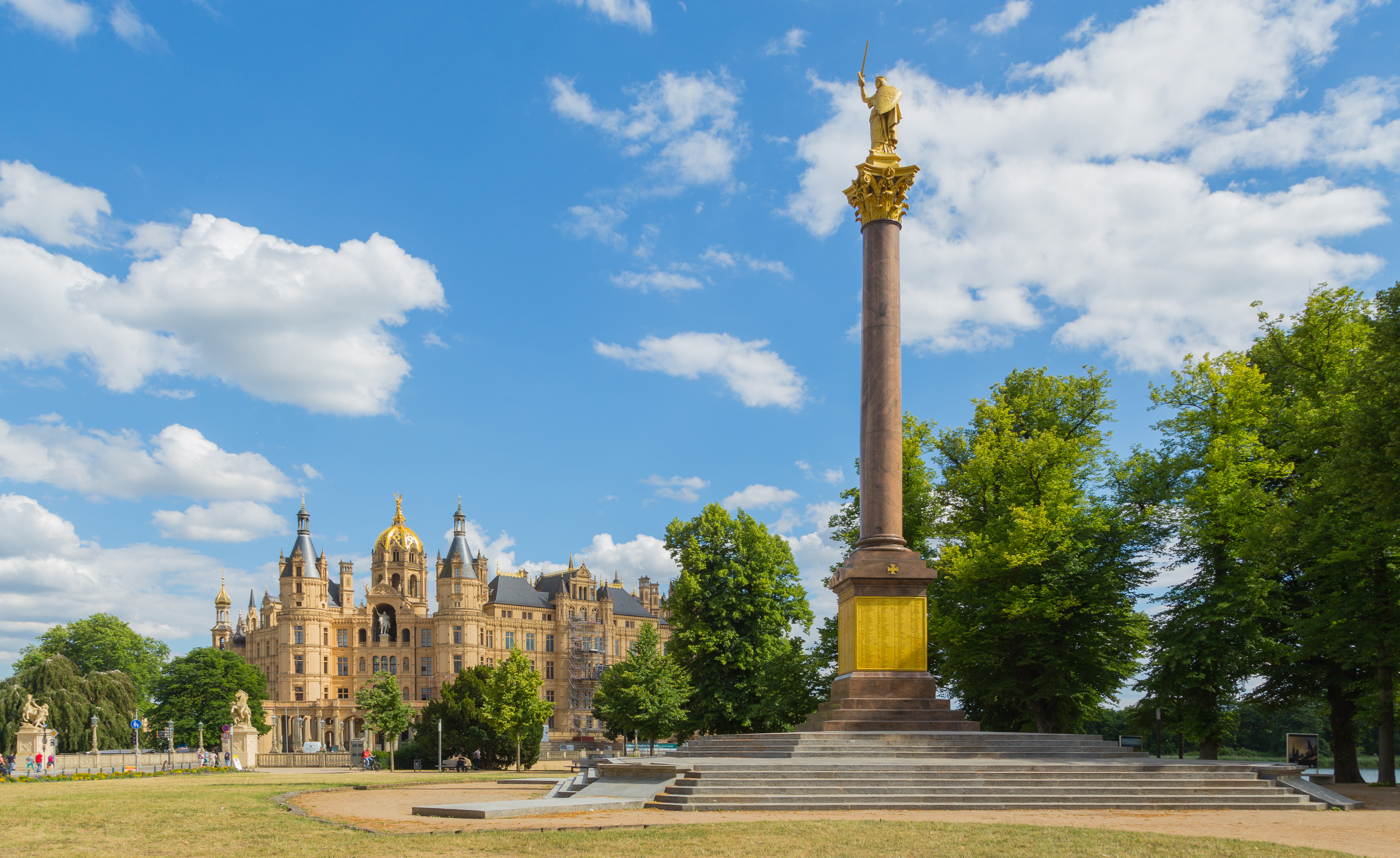
The allegorical representation of Mecklenburg, the Megalopolis on the victory column in the Alter Garten in Schwerin, is crowned with the Wendish Crown.

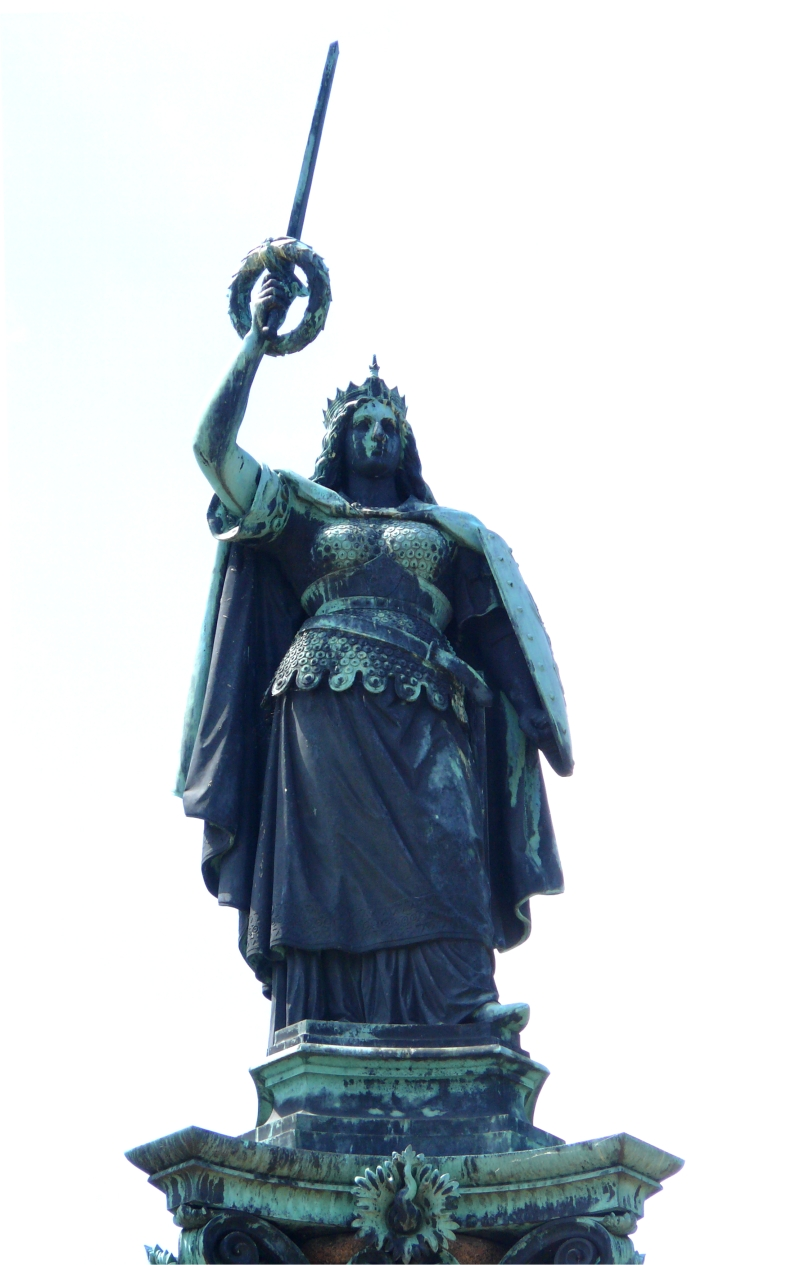
Closer view of the Megalopolis in Schwerin

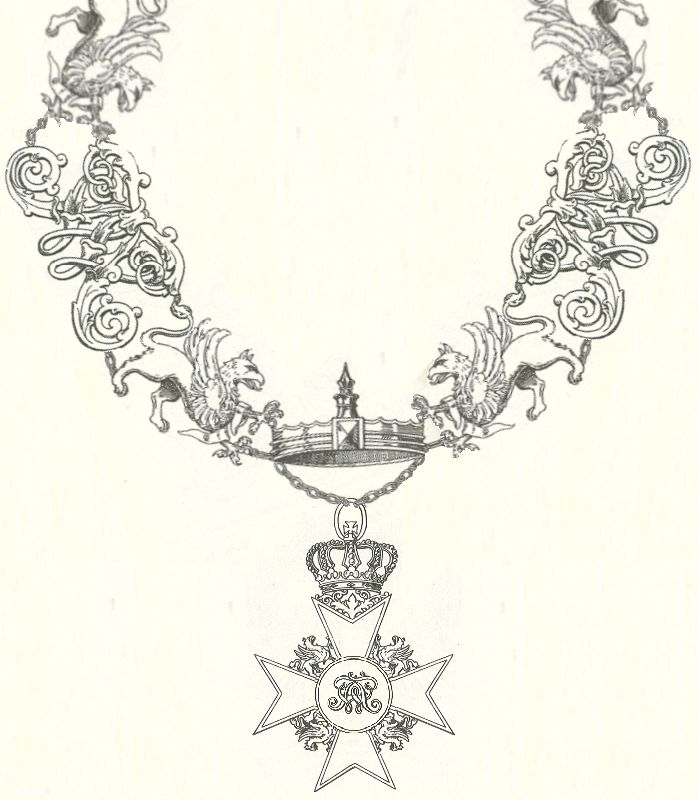
The necklace of the House Order of the Wendish Crown, depicting the Wendish Crown.

The coat of arms of the Grand Duchy of Mecklenburg-Schwerin, which includes the Wendish Crown in its design.
