= Brochocinek, Lower Silesian Voivodeship =

Brochocinek
- Village
- Location within Poland
- Coordinates: 50°48′01″N 16°57′36″E
- Country: Poland
- Voivodeship: Lower Silesian
- County: Strzelin
- Gmina: Kondratowice

Brochocinek [brɔxɔˈt͡ɕinɛk] is a village in the administrative district of Gmina Kondratowice, within Strzelin County, Lower Silesian Voivodeship, in south-western Poland.

As of 2021, the estimated population is 17.
