= History of Cieszyn =

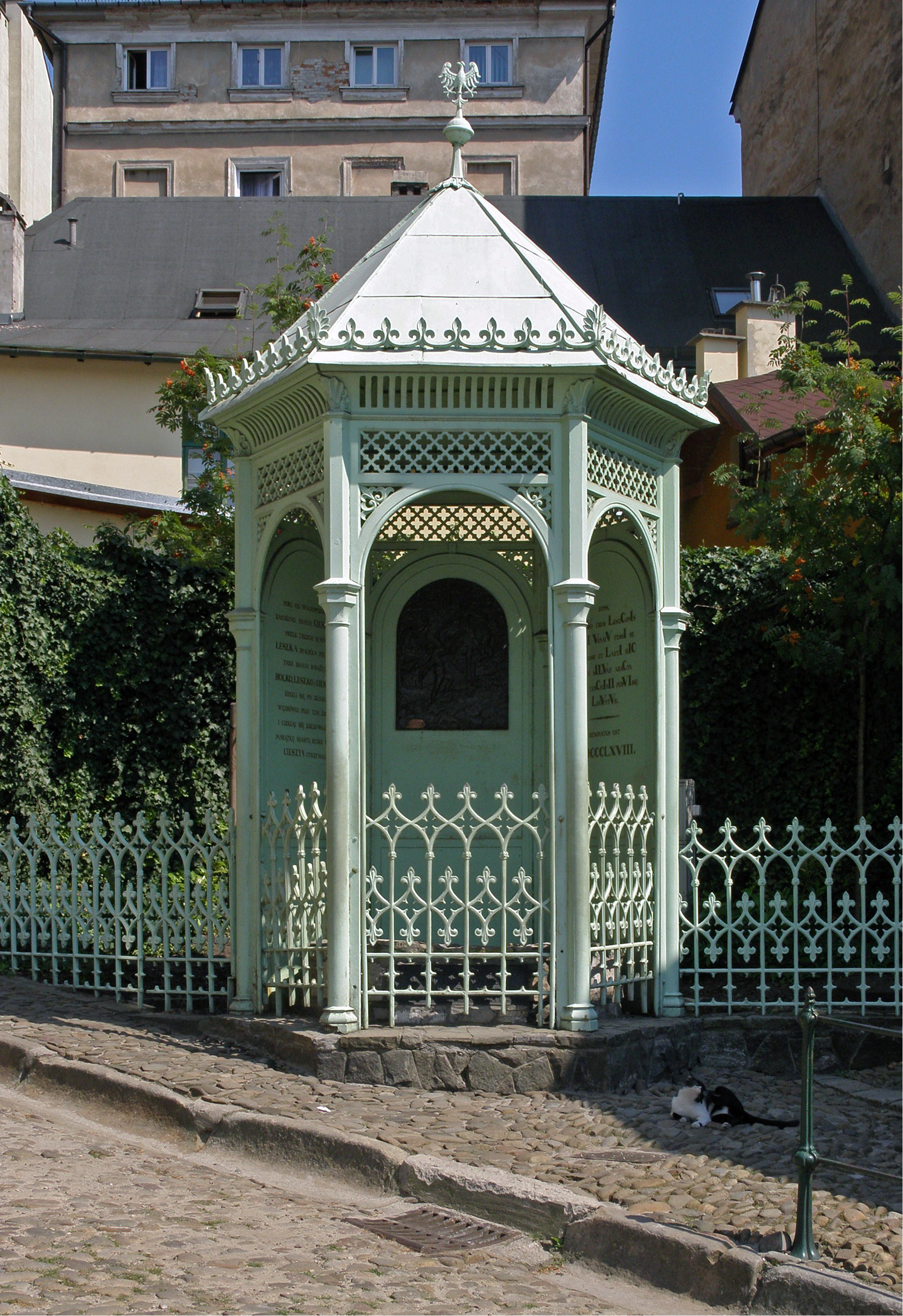
Three Brothers Fountain in Cieszyn

Cieszyn is one of the oldest towns in Silesia and has a history that has been traced back to at least the 7th century.

== History ==
=== Early history ===
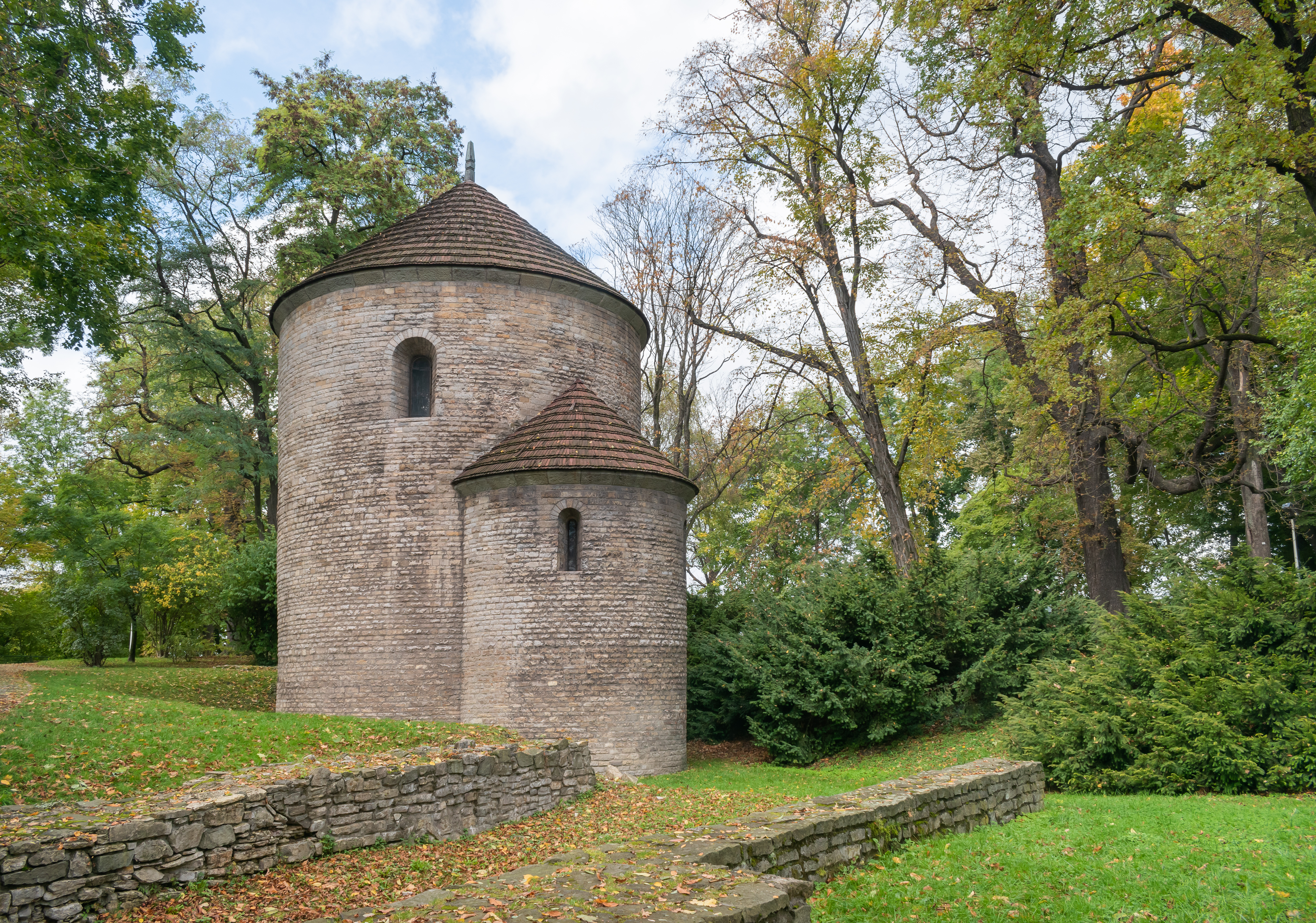
Saint Nicholas Rotunda Church on the Castle Hill in Cieszyn

Cieszyn, one of the oldest towns in Silesia, has had a Slav population (Golensizi tribe) since at least the 7th century. According to a modern legend, in 810 three sons of a Slav king – Bolko, Leszko and Cieszko, met here after a long pilgrimage, found a spring, and in their happiness decided to found a new settlement. They supposedly called it Cieszyn (cf. the verb for "to be happy"; Polish: cieszyć się, Czech: těšit se). This well stands in the ulica Trzech Braci (Three Brothers Street), just west of the town square. A more scientific explanation for the name is that it's patronymic in origin, derived from the Slavic name *Ciecha or *Ciesza. The town centres on Castle Hill (Góra Zamkowa), where the oldest traces of settlement date back to the 6th or 7th centuries. The gród built on the hill gradually gained importance and became an important administrative and religious center, as a castle and a Romanesque chapel were erected within its stakes in the 11th century, the latter surviving to this day (and is depicted on reverse of the 20 złotych note).

=== Piast rule ===
The area became part of the emerging Polish state under the Piast dynasty in the 10th century. The first written reference to Cieszyn came in a document from Pope Adrian IV for the Wrocław bishop Valter from 23 April 1155. It concerned the castle of Tessin, which was listed among other centres of castellanies, however it was no earlier than 1223 that it was explicitly described as castellany (castellatura de Tessin). Around the castle a town grew up on a fortified headland above the Olza River with the center around what is nowadays Plac Teatralny (Theater Square), where the very first parish church was built before the end of the 12th century. The document from 1223 issued by Bishop of Wrocław also mentioned the suburbium, which suggest that Cieszyn already had city rights. The city rights are documented in 1290, and later confirmed in 1374. Around 1240 a new parish church was also built in the vicinity of the first market square (nowadays Stary Targ - Old Market).

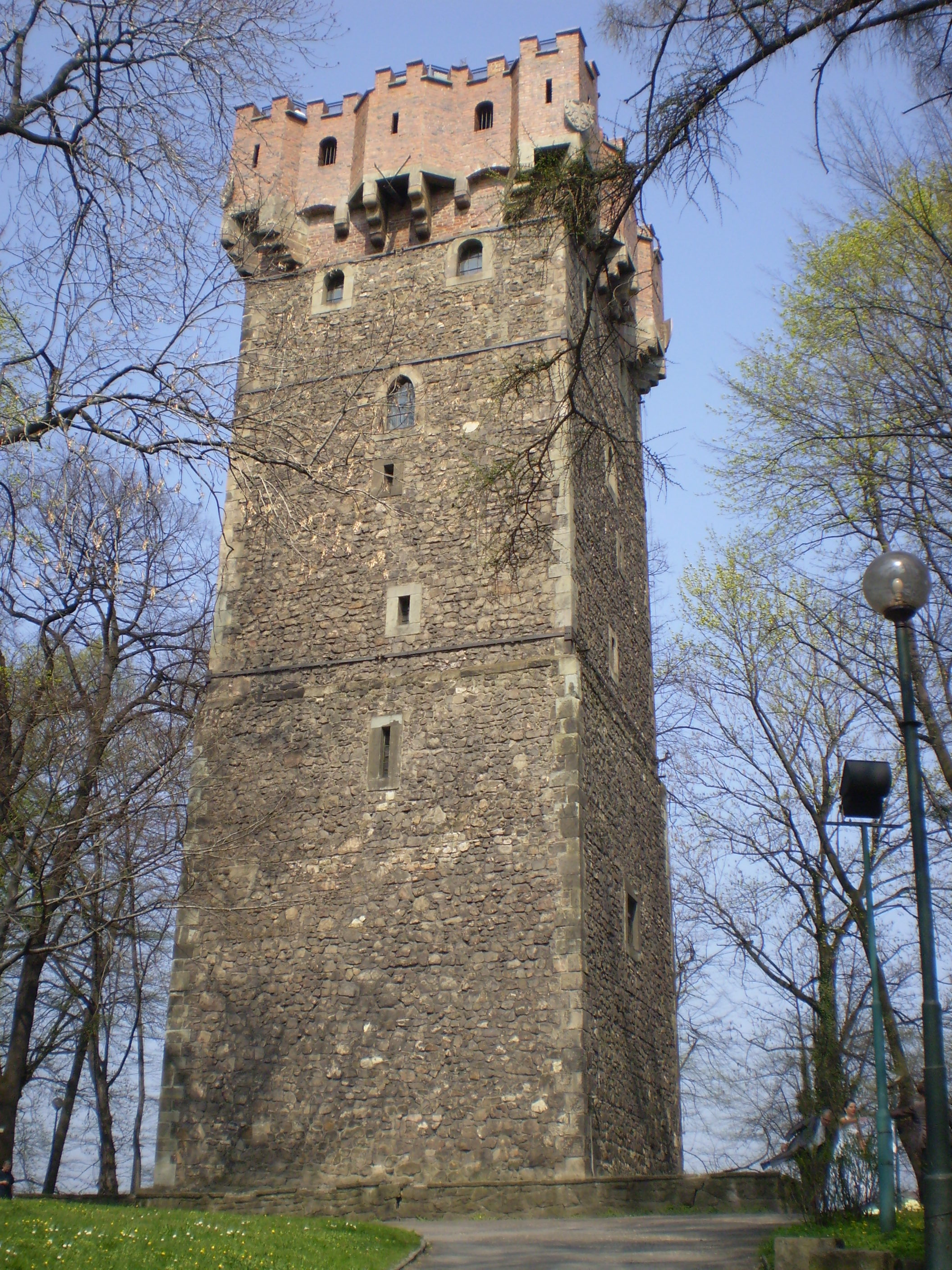
Piast Tower in Cieszyn

The town shared the history of Silesia, and after the feudal division of Poland, Piast dukes of the Silesian line ruled the area. Cieszyn became a seat of the Duchy of Cieszyn. In 1327 Kazimierz I swore homage to the Bohemian and titular Polish king John of Luxembourg. Since then, Cieszyn became an autonomic fiefdom of the Bohemian crown. As a capital city of the Duchy, Cieszyn developed quickly and increased its significance. It also became a religious center of the duchy, after creation of a deaconry in the early 14th century. The largest development occurred during the rule of Przemysław I Noszak, who gained the city rights for Cieszyn in 1374 and reconstructed the wooden castle into the bricked one. It was back then when the mayor and city council appeared, in 1387 first known mayor being Mikołaj Giseler. Town hall for the city council has been built.

Another rapid development of the town occurred during the rule of Casimir II, who invested in infrastructure of the town and erected defense walls around Cieszyn. Casimir II also founded a new market square and donated buildings for a new city council which serve the city to this day. In the 16th century the town became an important centre of trade and commerce, with significant manufacture of arms and jewelry. It also became a centre of the Reformation. The town gradually developed until the 17th century, when it was heavily damaged during the Thirty Years' War. As a result of the war, economic and demographic decline followed in the whole Duchy.

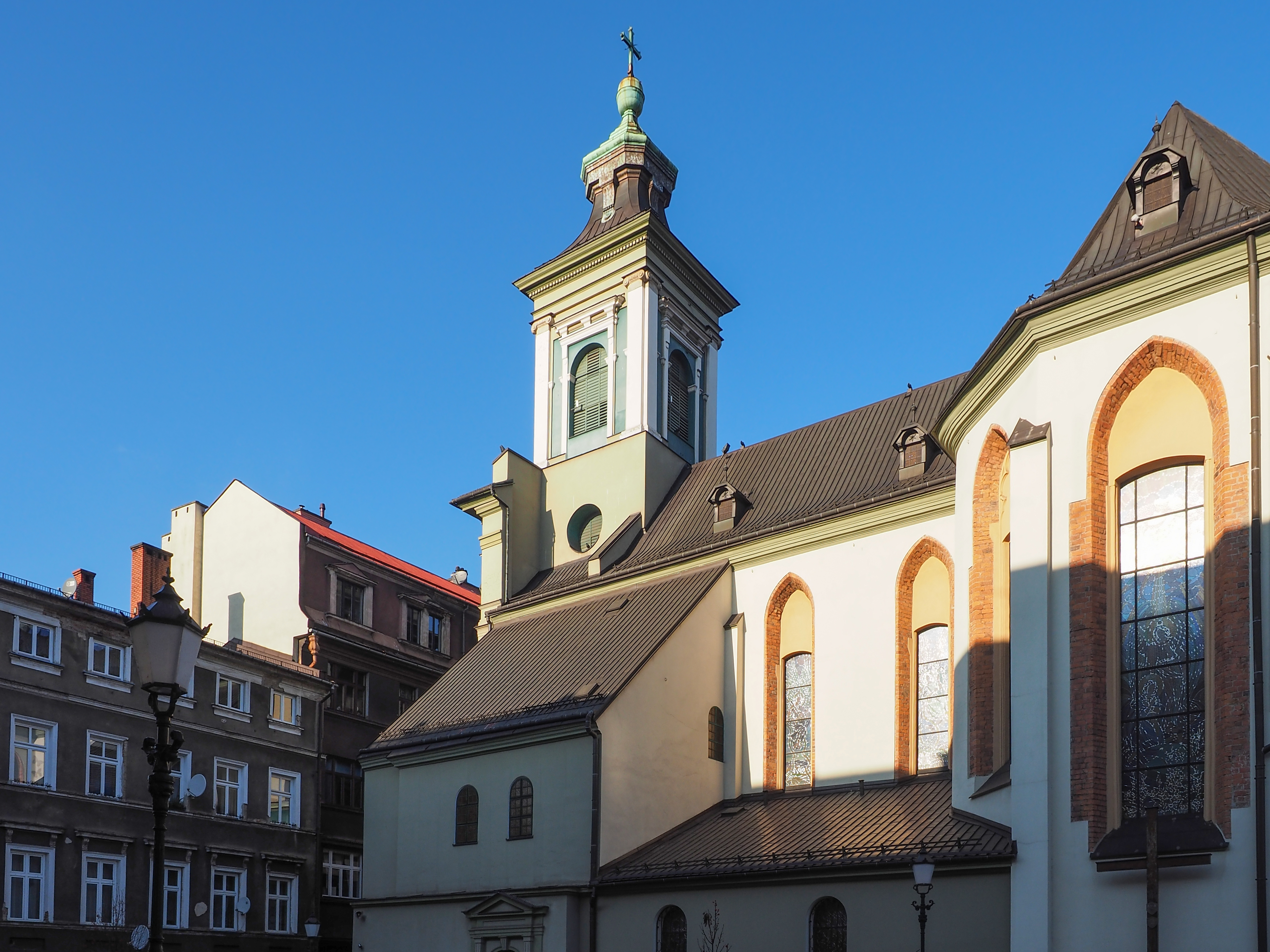
Church of Saint Mary Magdalene, burial site of the Cieszyn line of the Piast dynasty

The rule of the Cieszyn Piast dynasty continued to 1653, ending with the death of the last Duchess Elizabeth Lucretia. Thereupon the duchy lapsed directly to the Kings of Bohemia, at that time Ferdinand IV of Habsburg. The Habsburg takeover of the duchy caused economic and political stagnation of Cieszyn until the end of the century.

=== Cieszyn under Habsburg rule ===
The end of the era of Counter-Reformation allowed the construction of a large Lutheran church in Cieszyn in 1709–1750. The role of Teschen strengthened after the end of the Silesian Wars in the 18th century. As a result of the wars, Cieszyn Silesia remained part of Austria. On 13 May 1779 the Peace of Teschen ending the War of Bavarian Succession has been signed in the town by Austria and Prussia. In 1772 Cieszyn also served as the main seat of the Bar Confederation. Development of the town has been halted by the great fire of 1789, which damaged nearly the whole town. Since late 18th century German culture began to dominate in the town.

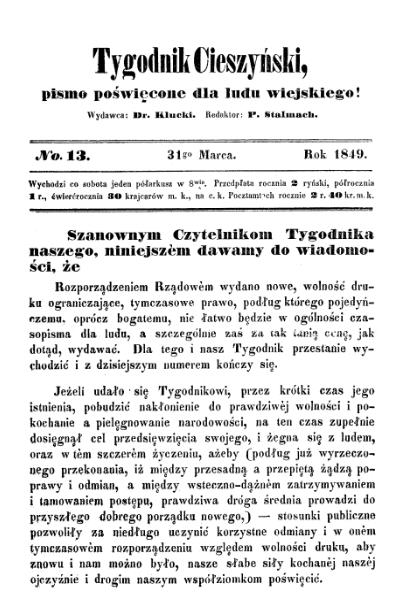
Front page of Tygodnik Cieszyński, 31 March 1849

In the 19th century Cieszyn underwent rapid cultural and educational development. In 1802 the priest Leopold Szersznik created a museum which later became a Museum of Cieszyn Silesia, one of the first public museums in Polish lands. In 1839 the Piast castle has been finally dismantled, and a new Classicist castle erected in its place. In 1836 another fire affected Cieszyn and destroyed part of the central city, including the town hall, which was restored in 1846 and remains in this form since then. In the same year a brewery was built near Castle Hill. During the Spring of Nations of 1848, Cieszyn became an important centre of the Polish national thought. In the same year, the first Polish and the first at all newspaper in the duchy, the Tygodnik Cieszyński appeared.

After Revolutions of 1848 in the Austrian Empire a modern municipal division was introduced in the re-established Austrian Silesia. The town became a seat of political and legal district.

In 1869 the railway line reached Cieszyn and a rail station was constructed at the left bank of the Olza River (current Český Těšín). Construction of the rail station caused a quick development of the left bank of the town, which served as the industrial portion of the town. The industrial development was overshadowed by the more industrial neighbouring town of Bielsko. Teschen however remained an important administrative and cultural centre.

At the end of the 19th century the population of the town consisted mostly of Germans and Poles, with Germans being the majority in the town and Poles being the majority in the whole duchy. There were also significant Jewish and Czech minorities and occasionally a visible Hungarian minority.

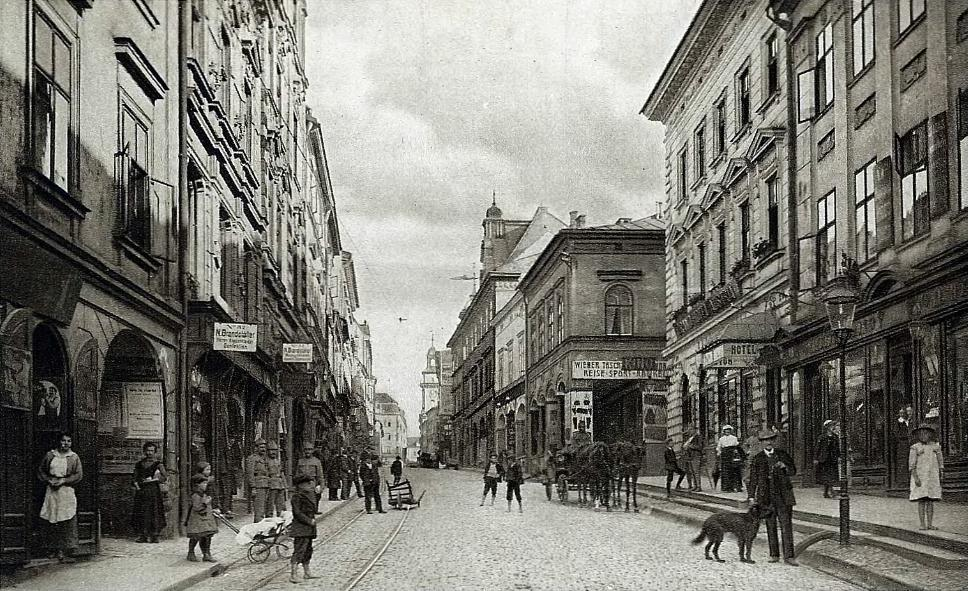
Głęboka Street in 1917-1918

According to the censuses conducted in 1880, 1890, 1900 and 1910 the population of the town grew from 13,004 in 1880 to 22,489 in 1910 with a growing majority being native German-speakers (from 49.5% in 1880 to 61.5% in 1910) accompanied by a Polish-speaking minority (at most 42.7% in 1890, then dropping to 31.7% in 1910), Czech-speaking (at most 13.9% in 1880, later between 4.2% in 1890 and 6.7% in 1910) and at most 69 people speaking another languages in 1900. In terms of religion in 1910 majority were Roman Catholics (67.3%), followed by Protestants (23%), Jews (9.4%) and additional 65 people who were adherents to another faiths. Traditionally the town and especially its surroundings were inhabited by Cieszyn Vlachs speaking Cieszyn Silesian dialect. The growth of German language, then prestigious language of the state, can be partially attributed to various reasons, including cultural cringe of indigenous Slavic denizens. The results of those censuses and factors shaping national identity of the local population became a perennial subject of the political squabbles in the region.

In 1911 a tramway line was built; it crossed the Olza River and connected the rail station on the left bank with the town centre on the right bank. During World War I, Austrian troops were stationed in the town, and the General Staff of the Austrian army established itself there for some time.

=== Interbellum ===
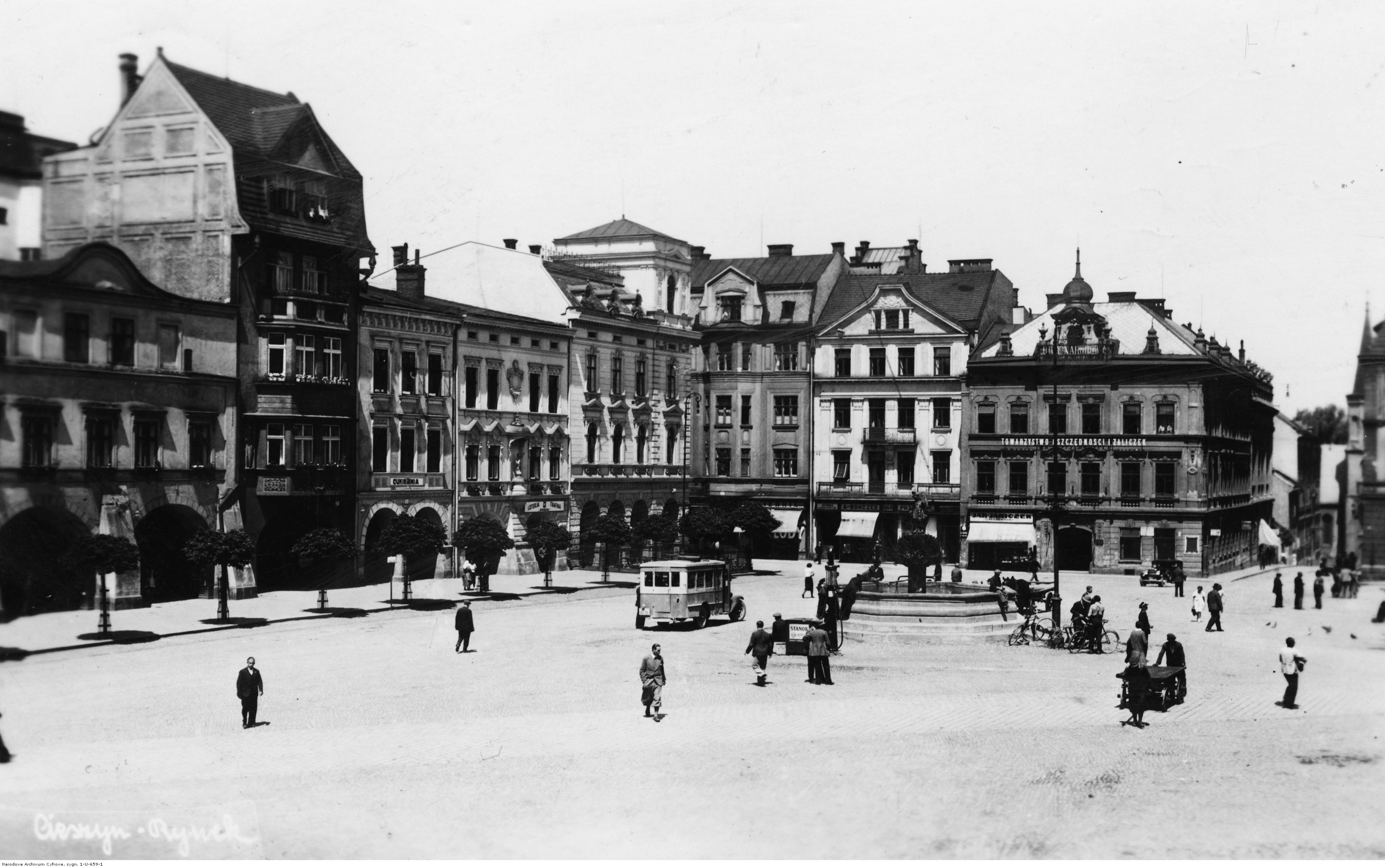
Cieszyn in the 1930s

Historian Piotr Stefan Wandycz argues that:

The dispute over Teschen during the Paris Peace Conference is crucial for understanding Czechoslovak-Polish relations in 1919 and in the following years. It also brings out clearly the French attitude toward both Czechoslovakia and Poland.

The region was rich in coal and rail connections and was eagerly sought by both Poland and Czechoslovakia. At the end of World War I local Poles and Czechs each established their own self-governing organs. Both groups claimed that the whole of Cieszyn Silesia rightfully belonged to their new nation. To ease the friction which developed, the local self-governments concluded an interim agreement on 5 November 1918 concerning the division of the area based on ethnic composition. However, by 1919 metropolitan governments in Prague and Warsaw superseded the local administrations, with the Czechs arguing that the division was unfair. In particular, the crucial railway going to east Slovakia (Košice-Bohumín Railway) went through the region and access to the railway was vital: newly formed Czechoslovakia was at war with the Hungarian Soviet Republic over control over Slovakia. This set the stage for conflict.

Despite the division being interim only, Poland decided to organise elections to the Polish parliament (Sejm) in the area. Czechoslovakia claimed that no sovereign rule could establish itself in the disputed area before determination of a definitive solution, and requested that the polls not take place in the area. Poland rejected the Czechoslovak request and Czechoslovakia attacked the Polish part of the region on 23 January 1919 and forced Poland, which was at that time in war also with the West Ukrainian National Republic over eastern Galicia, to withdraw from the western part of Cieszyn Silesia. After the fight near Skoczów a cease-fire was reached, signed in Paris on 3 February 1919. Poland had to recognize new borders running along the Olza River in 1920. Czechoslovakia received the western section (including the Karviná coal basin and the railway line) and smaller western part of the town, known later as Český Těšín, while Poland received the eastern section with Cieszyn and its historical centre.

During interwar period two villages were merged with Cieszyn: Błogocice (in 1923) and Bobrek (in 1932).

Since then, Poland occasionally claimed the Czech section, eventually annexing it in October 1938 after the Munich Agreement.

=== World War II ===
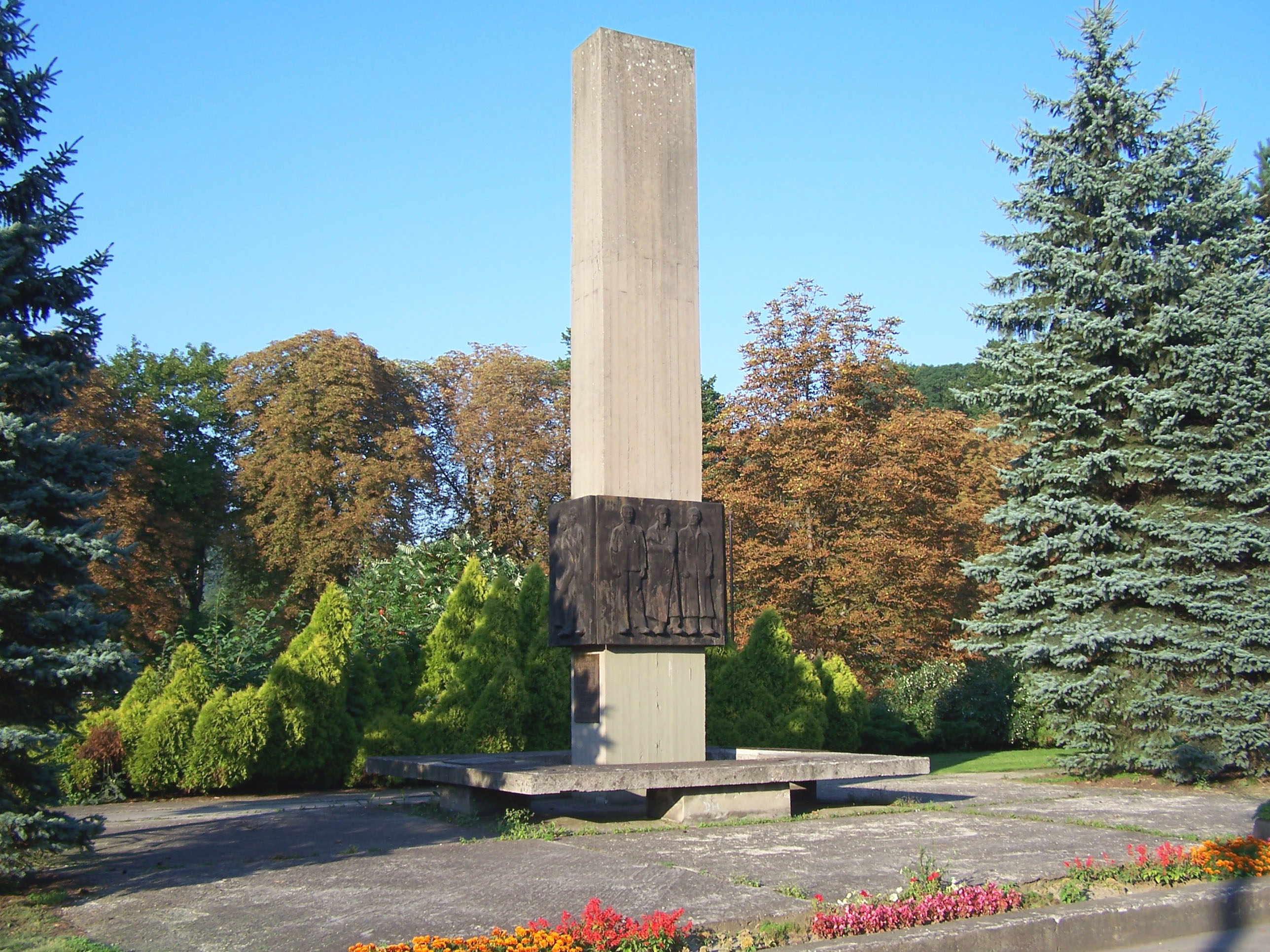
Memorial dedicated to World War II resistance fighters of Poland, Czechoslovakia and other countries. Constructed at Kontešinec, Český Těšín, on the site of the Stalag VIII-D POW camp

Following the joint German-Soviet invasion of Poland, which started World War II in September 1939, the entire town was occupied by Germany until 1945. In 1939–1940, the Germans carried out mass arrests of local Poles during the genocidal Intelligenzaktion campaign, and then imprisoned them in a newly established Nazi prison in the town. Many Polish teachers, school principals, priests and activists were deported to concentration camps and murdered there. The Nazi prison had two forced labour subcamps in the town, and two more in nearby Karviná and Konská. The Germans also established a camp for children up to the age of 2-3, where they were beaten, tortured and subjected to medical experiments. In 1941, the occupiers established the Stalag VIII-D prisoner-of-war camp for Polish, French, Belgian, British and Serbian POWs, which in September 1942 was converted into a subcamp of the Stalag VIII-B camp. The Germans also operated the E386 forced labour subcamp of the Stalag VIII-B/344 POW camp in the present-day district of Krasna.

The 1920 borders were restored after the war in 1945.

=== Post-war period ===
After World War II, both cities were expanded by joining adjacent villages. Svibice (1947), Dolní Žukov (1960), Horní Žukov, Mistřovice (together with Mosty and Koňákov) and Stanislavice (1975) were amalgamated with Český Těšín; while in 1973 Boguszowice, Gułdowy, Kalembice, Krasna, Mnisztwo, Pastwiska and in 1977 Marklowice were amalgamated with Cieszyn.

== See also ==
- Border conflicts between Poland and Czechoslovakia
- Duchy of Teschen
- Tesching

== References and further reading ==
=== In English ===
- Gromada, Thaddeus V. "Slovak Nationalists and Poland during the Interwar Period, Jednota Annual Furdek (1979), Vol. 18, pp 241-253.
- Hannan, Kevin. Borders of language and identity in Teschen Silesia (Peter Lang, 1996)
- Paul, Ellen L. "Czech Teschen Silesia and the Controversial Czechoslovak Census of 1921," The Polish Review (1998) 43#2 pp. 161–171 in JSTOR
- Woytak, Richard A. "Polish Military Intervention into Czechoslovakian and Western Slovakia in September–November 1938," East European Quarterly (1972) 6#3 pp 376–387.

=== Others ===
- Dzieje Cieszyna od pradziejów do czasów współczesnych [The history of Cieszyn from prehistory to the present day]. A collective work edited by Idzi Panic. Cieszyn: Książnica Cieszyńska. 2010. ISBN 978-83-927052-6-0.
- Długajczyk, Edward (1993). Tajny front na granicy cieszyńskiej. Wywiad i dywersja w latach 1919-1939. Katowice: Śląsk. ISBN 83-85831-03-7.
- Panic, Idzi (2002). Poczet Piastów i Piastówien cieszyńskich (in Polish). Cieszyn: Urząd Miejski. ISBN 83-917095-4-X. OCLC 55650394.
- Wawreczka, Henryk; Janusz Spyra; Mariusz Makowski (1999). Těšín, Český Těšín na starých pohlednicích a fotografiích / Cieszyn, Czeski Cieszyn na starych widokówkach i fotografiach. Nebory, Třinec: Wart. ISBN 80-238-4804-6.
- Wawreczka, Henryk; Irena Adamczyk; Vlasta Byrtusová; Janusz Spyra (2001). Cieszyn wczoraj i dziś / Český Těšín včera a dnes. Český Těšín: Wart. ISBN 80-238-7590-6.
- Žáček, Rudolf (2004). Dějiny Slezska v datech. Praha: Libri. ISBN 80-7277-172-8.
- Zahradnik, Stanisław; Marek Ryczkowski (1992). Korzenie Zaolzia. Warszawa - Praga - Trzyniec: PAI-press. OCLC 177389723.
- "Zaolzie". Nowa Encyklopedia Powszechna PWN. Vol. VI. Warszawa: PWN. 1997. ISBN 83-01-11969-1.
