= Czech Silesia =

Historical land in the Czech Republic

Czech Silesia České Slezsko (Czech)
- Historical land
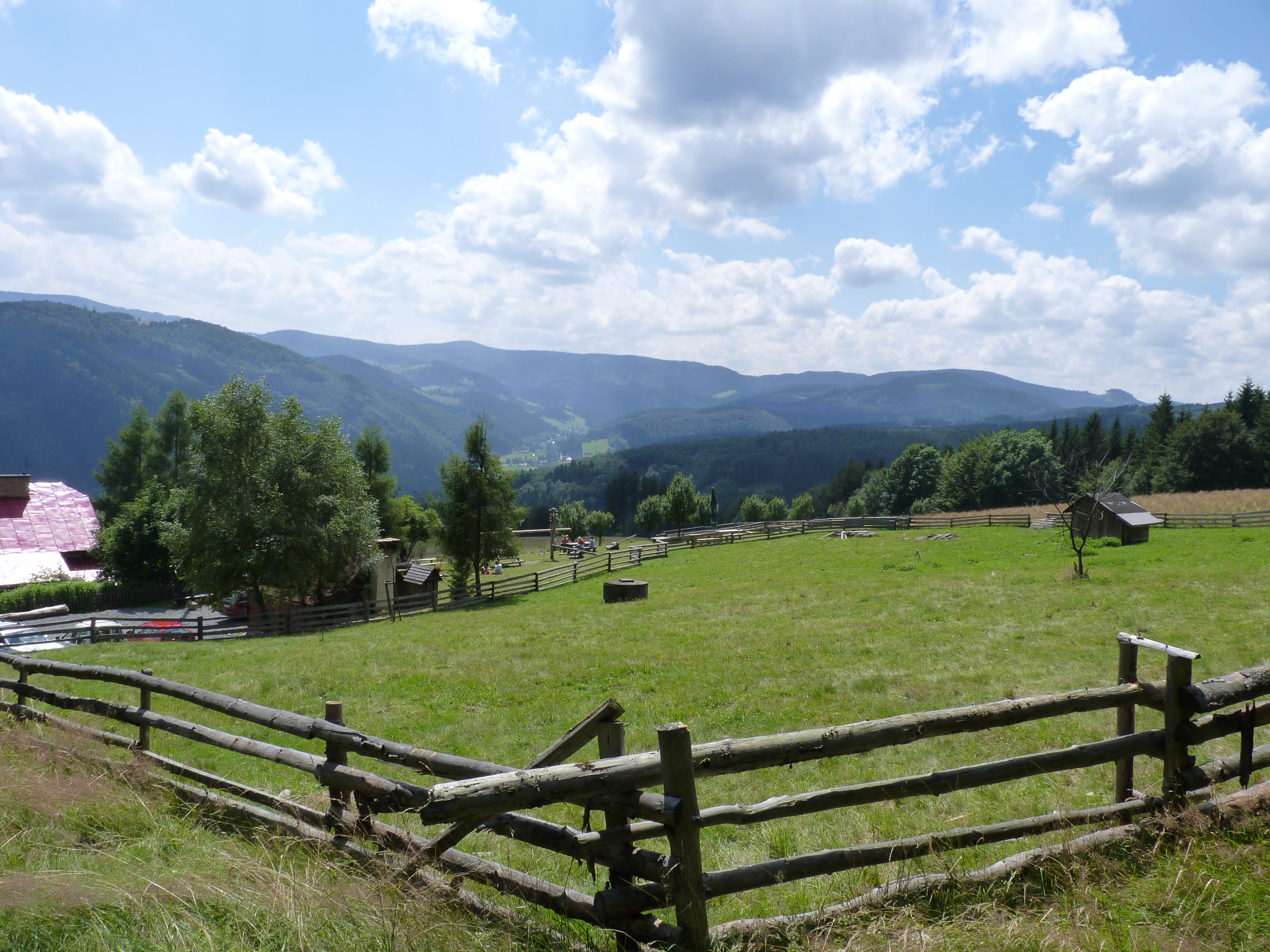
- Moravian-Silesian Beskids

- Flag Coat of arms
- Anthem: "Slezská hymna"
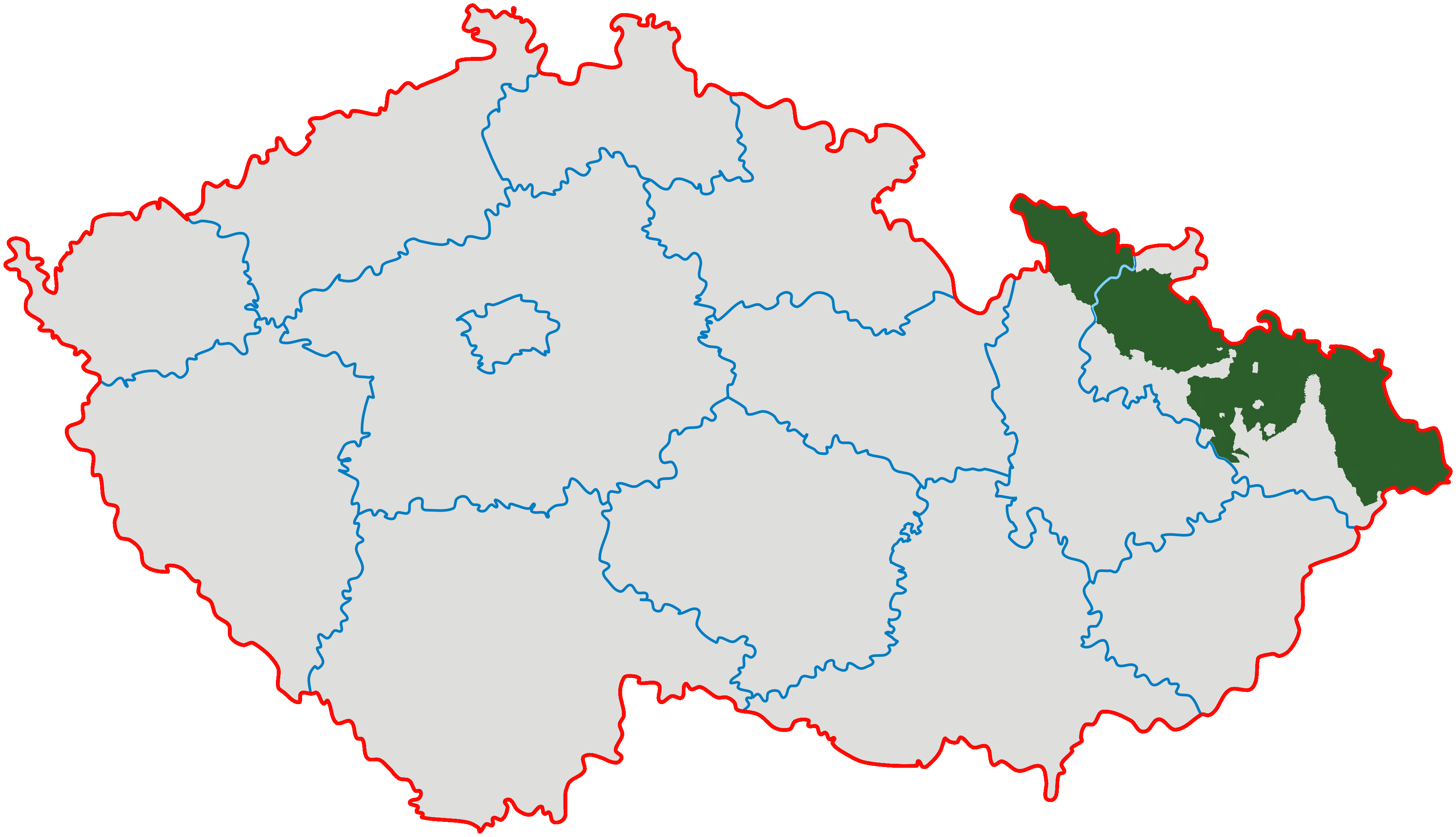
- Czech Silesia (green) overlapped with the current regions of the Czech Republic

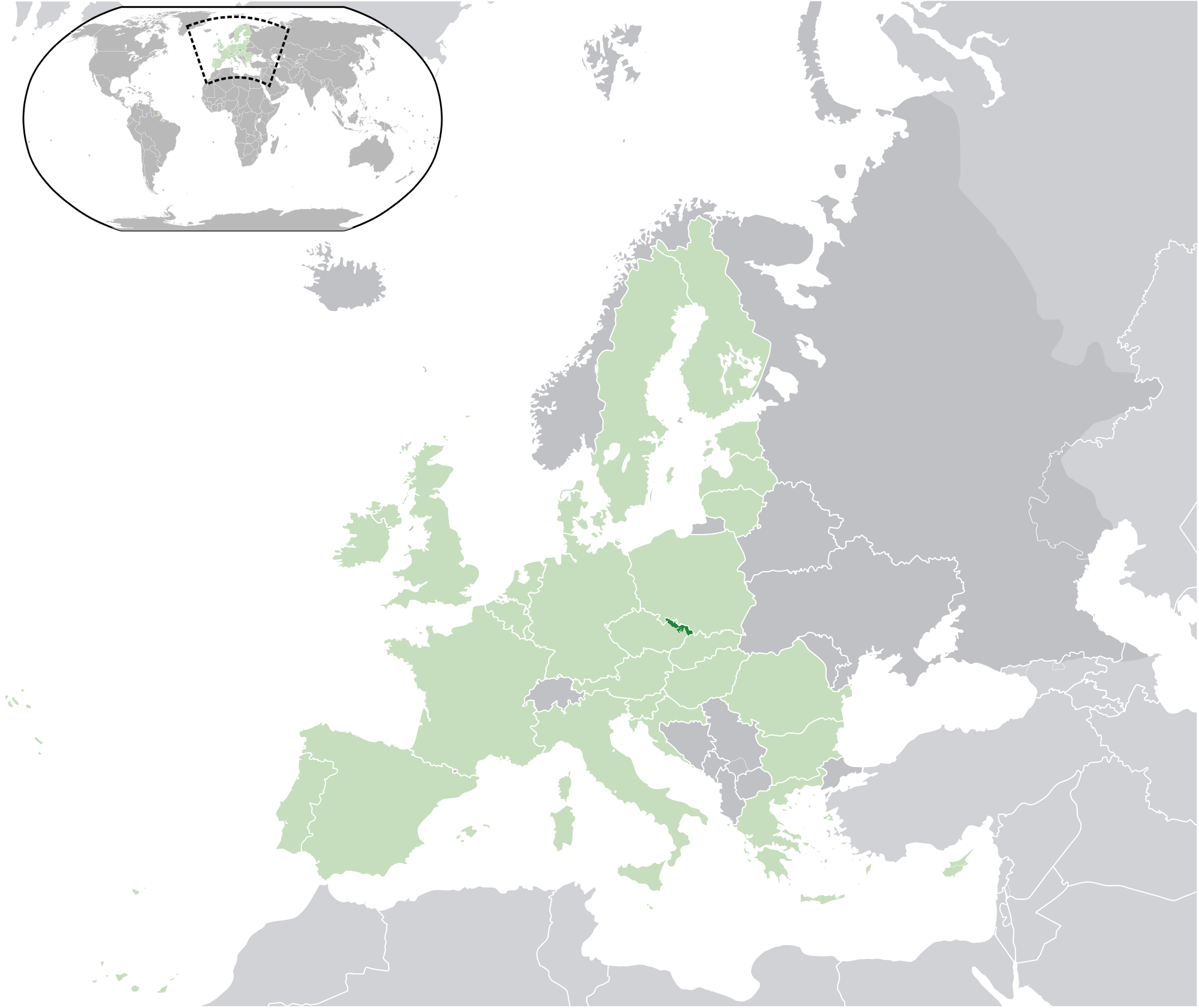
- Location of Czech Silesia in Europe
- Coordinates: 50°N 18°E
- Country: Czech Republic
- Former capital: Opava
- Largest city: Ostrava

Area
  - Total: 4,459 km^{2} (1,722 sq mi)

Population
  - Total: 830,000
  - Density: 190/km^{2} (480/sq mi)
- Time zone: UTC+1 (CET)
  - Summer (DST): UTC+2 (CEST)
- Primary airport: Leoš Janáček Airport Ostrava

Czech Silesia (Note: /saɪˈliːʒə, saɪˈliːʃiə/ sy-LEE-zhə, sy-LEE-shee-ə, UK also /saɪˈliːziə/ sy-LEE-zee-ə, US also /saɪˈliːʒiə, saɪˈliːʃə, sɪˈliː-/ sy-LEE-zhee-ə, sy-LEE-shə, sil-EE-.) (Czech: České Slezsko; Polish: Śląsk Czeski) is a part of the historical region of Silesia now in the Czech Republic. While it currently has no formal boundaries, in a narrow geographic sense, it encompasses most or all of the territory of the Czech Republic within the Oder River's drainage basin. Together with Bohemia and Moravia, it is one of the three historical Czech lands.

Silesia lies in the north-east of the Czech Republic, predominantly in the Moravian-Silesian Region, with a section in the northern Olomouc Region. It is almost identical in extent with Austrian Silesia (also known as the Duchy of Upper and Lower Silesia), before 1918; between 1938 and 1945, part of the area was also known as Sudeten Silesia (German: Sudetenschlesien; Czech: Sudetské Slezsko; Polish: Śląsk Sudecki).

== Geography ==
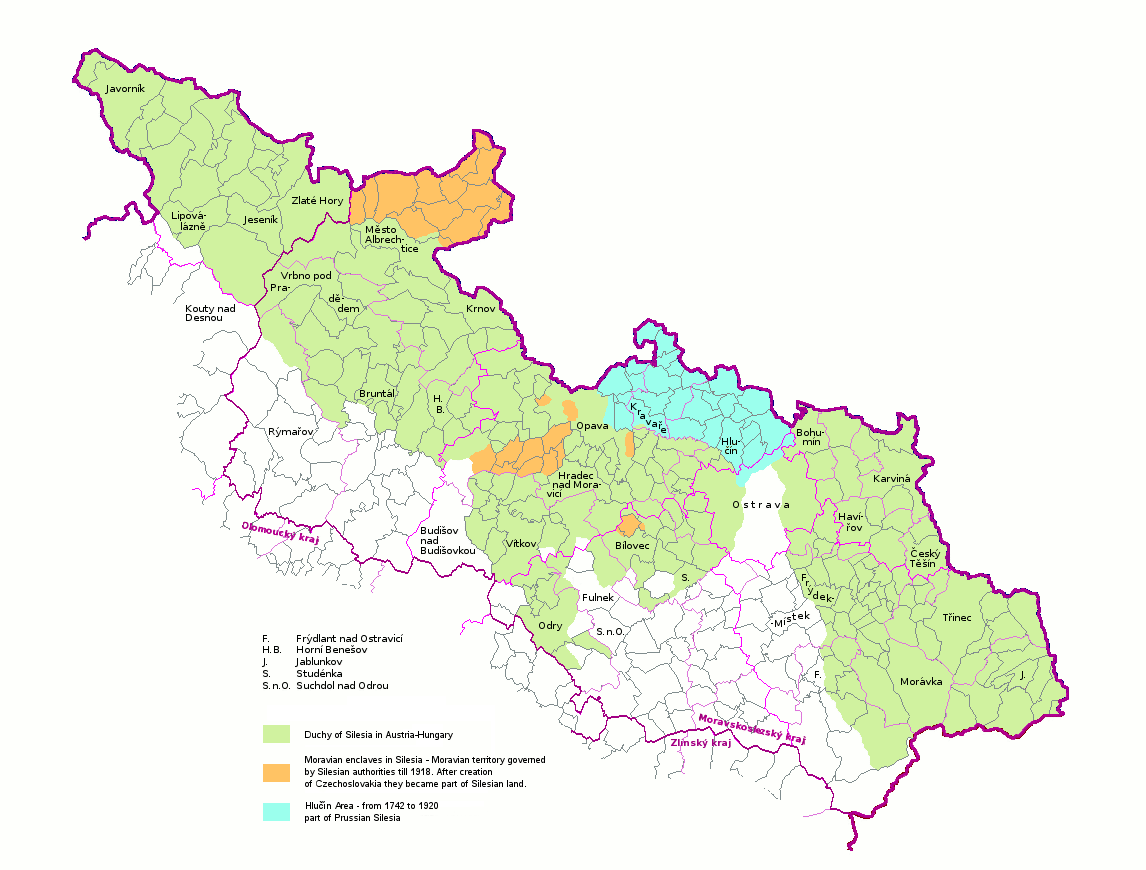
Czech Silesia now lies across several of the northern regions

Czech Silesia borders Moravia in the south, Poland (Polish Silesia) in the north (in the northwest the County of Kladsko, until 1742/48 an integral part of Bohemia) and Slovakia in the southeast. With the city of Ostrava roughly in its geographic centre, the area comprises much of the modern region of Moravian-Silesia (save for its southern edges) and, in its far west, a small part of the Olomouc Region in the area of Jeseník District. After Ostrava, the most important cities are Opava and Český Těšín. Historically Český Těšín is the western part of the city of Cieszyn, which nowadays lies in Poland.

About two thirds of the territory is situated in the Eastern Sudetes. The rest of the territory extends into the Ostrava Basin, Moravian Gate, Moravian-Silesian Foothills and into the western section of the Western Beskids. Its major rivers are the Oder, Opava and Olza (which forms part of the natural border with Poland).

== History ==
In the Middle Ages, Silesia formed part of Piast-ruled Poland, and in the 14th century it gradually passed to the Kingdom of Bohemia. Modern-day Czech Silesia derives primarily from a small part of Silesia that remained within the Bohemian Crown and the Habsburg monarchy at the end of the First Silesian War in 1742, when the rest of Silesia was ceded to Prussia. It was re-organised as the Duchy of Upper and Lower Silesia, with its capital at Opava (German: Troppau, Polish: Opawa). In 1900, the Duchy occupied an area of 5,140 km^{2} and had a population of 670,000.

In 1918, the former Duchy formed part of the newly created state of Czechoslovakia, except for Cieszyn Silesia, which was split between Czechoslovakia and Poland in 1920, Czechoslovakia gaining its western portion. Hlučín Region (Czech: Hlučínsko, German: Hultschiner Ländchen), formerly part of Prussian Silesia, also became part of Czechoslovakia under the Treaty of Versailles in 1920.

Following the Munich Agreement of 1938, most of Czech Silesia became part of the Reichsgau Sudetenland and Poland occupied the Trans-Olza area on the west bank of the Olza (the Polish gains being lost when Nazi Germany occupied Poland the following year). In 1939–1940, during the anti-Polish Intelligenzaktion campaign, many Polish activists, priests, officials, teachers and school principals were deported by the German occupiers to concentration camps and then murdered there. The Germans operated multiple forced labour camps in the region, including several Polenlager camps for Poles, multiple subcamps of the Stalag VIII-B/344 prisoner-of-war camp for Allied POWs, and subcamps of the Auschwitz concentration camp in Bruntál and Světlá Hora for mostly Jewish women. The occupiers also established several POW camps, including Oflag VIII-E, Oflag VIII-G, Heilag VIII-G and Stalag VIII-D, for Polish, French, Belgian, British, Serbian, Dutch and other Allied POWs.

With the exception of the areas around Cieszyn, Ostrava, and Hlučín, Czech Silesia was predominantly settled by German-speaking populations up until 1945. Following the World War II, Czech Silesia and Hlučín Region were returned to Czechoslovakia and the ethnic Germans were expelled in accordance with the Potsdam Agreement. The border with Poland was once again set along the Olza (although not confirmed by treaty until 1958).

== Demographics ==
The population mainly speaks Czech with altered vowels. Some of the native Slavic population speak Lach, which is classed by Ethnologue as a dialect of Czech, although it also shows some similarities to Polish. In Cieszyn Silesia, the unique Cieszyn Silesian dialect is also spoken, mostly by members of the Polish minority there.

Historical population

Year	Pop.	±%
1869	420,707	—
1880	464,646	+10.4%
1890	501,635	+8.0%
1900	572,000	+14.0%
1910	638,404	+11.6%

Year	Pop.	±%
1921	654,433	+2.5%
1930	716,698	+9.5%
1950	604,498	−15.7%
1961	737,872	+22.1%
1970	842,454	+14.2%

Year	Pop.	±%
1980	894,725	+6.2%
1991	895,776	+0.1%
2001	887,141	−1.0%
2011	846,855	−4.5%
2021	811,433	−4.2%

Source: Censuses

== Notable people ==
- Martin of Opava (?–1278), chronicler, chaplain of several popes
- Jiří Třanovský (1592–1637), pastor and hymnwriter, the "Luther of the Slavs"
- Jindřich František Boblig of Edelstadt (c. 1612 – 1698), egregious inquisitor
- Gregor Mendel (1822–1884), biologist, founder of genetics
- Hans Kudlich (1823–1917), politician, main figure in the struggle for abolition of serfdom in Austrian Empire
- Vincenc Prasek (1843–1912), historian
- Johann Palisa (1848–1925), astronomer
- Petr Bezruč (1867–1958), poet
- Józef Kożdoń (1873–1949), politician, leader of Silesian autonomists, proponent of the idea of a distinct Silesian nation ("Slonzaks")
- Helen Zelezny-Scholz (1882–1974), architectural sculptor
- Óndra Łysohorsky (1905–1989), poet, creator of the literary form of the Lach dialect
- Joy Adamson (1910–1980), writer
- František Vláčil (1924–1999), film director and screenwriter
- Armin Delong (1925–2017), physicist specializing in electron microscopy
- Věra Chytilová (1929–2014), film director and screenwriter
- Hana Zagorová (1946–2022), pop singer
- Jaromír Nohavica (born 1953), songwriter and poet
- Iva Bittová (born 1958), avant-garde violinist, singer and composer
- Leon Koudelak (born 1961), classical guitarist
- Petra Kvitová (born 1990), tennis player
- Krystyna Pyszková (born 1999), model and beauty pageant titleholder
