= Długajczyk =

Długajczyk is a Polish surname. Notable people with the surname include:

- Alexander Dlugaiczyk (born 1983), German footballer
- Edward Długajczyk (born 1939), Polish historian
