= Jan Szuścik =

Polish teacher and politician

Jan Szuścik (23 October 1879 in Gułdowy - 1941 in Oranienburg concentration camp) was a Polish teacher, politician and member of the Silesian Parliament.

Jan Szuścik was born in peasant family in Gułdowy near Cieszyn to Paweł and Anna, née Pastuszek.

In 1900 he graduated from secondary school for teachers (Lehrerseminar) in Cieszyn. He worked initially at a school in Łazy, followed by an assignment in Bogumin. In 1922-1930 he was a deputy in the Silesian Parliament. From 1938 to 1939 Szuścik worked as a mayor of Łazy.

After the World War II had broken out, he was arrested by Nazi Germans during the Intelligenzaktion Schlesien and sent to the Oranienburg concentration camp. He was killed there on 18 April 1941.

Szuścik had one daughter Stefania who was married to Feliks Bocheński. They both emigrated to the United States.
