= Tesching =

Small calibre rifle

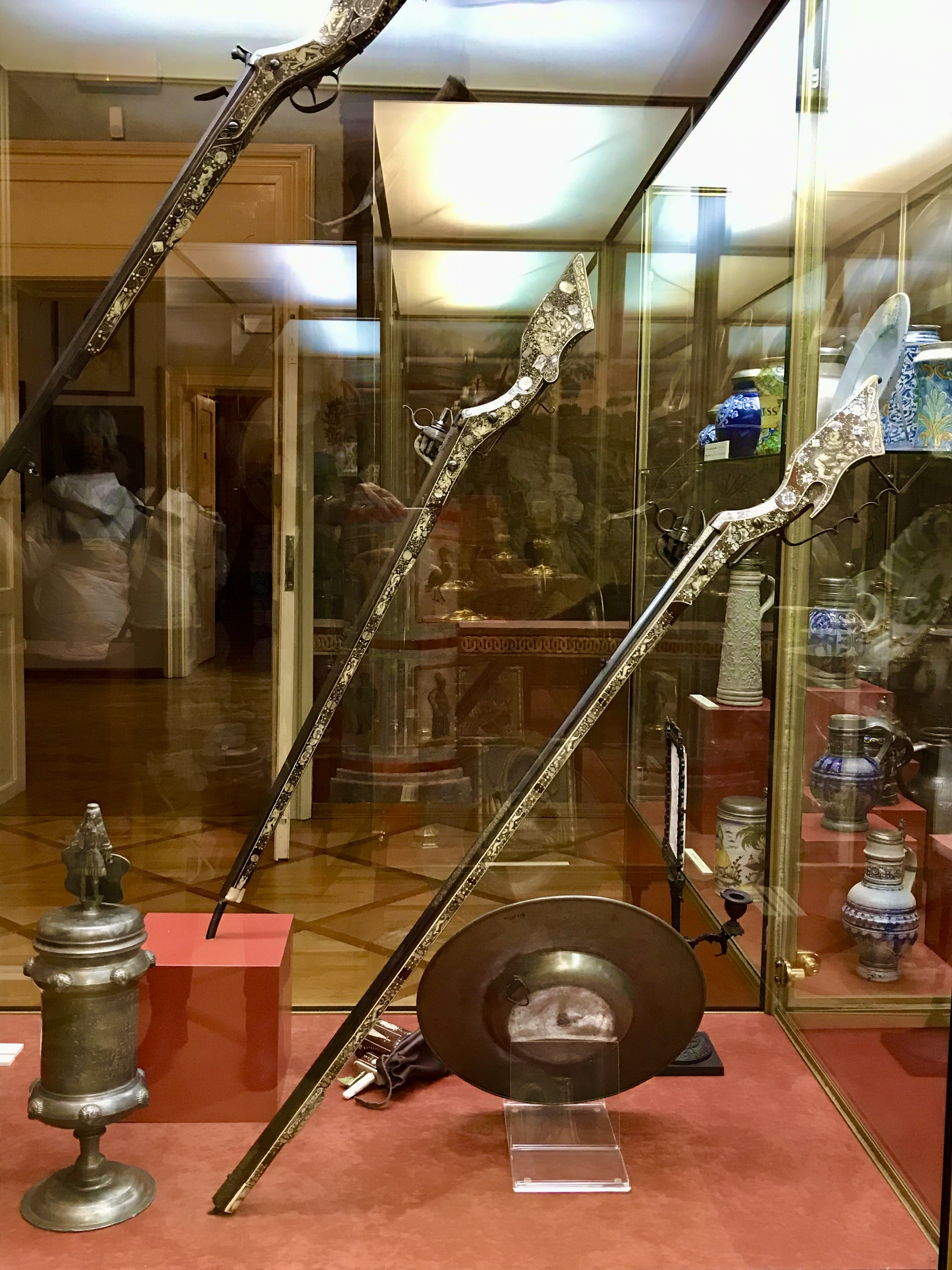
Cieszynka rifle on display at the Museum of Cieszyn Silesia in Cieszyn

The tesching (Polish: cieszynka, French: teschin) is a rifle of very small calibre (less than 6mm), which propels a very light bullet a short distance (10–20 metres) with a percussion cap instead of a charge of gunpowder. The rifle appears to derive its name from the city of Teschen.

The firearm was used in the late 19th and early 20th centuries for sport shooting. A number of shooting clubs, therefore, include the name Tesching or Teschin. There were also some similar long-guns operating solely by percussion cap. These firearms were also used by young people to learn the basics of hunting, though due to their low power they were only suitable on small game or birds at close range.

== See also ==
- History of the firearm
