= Kevin Hannan =

American linguist

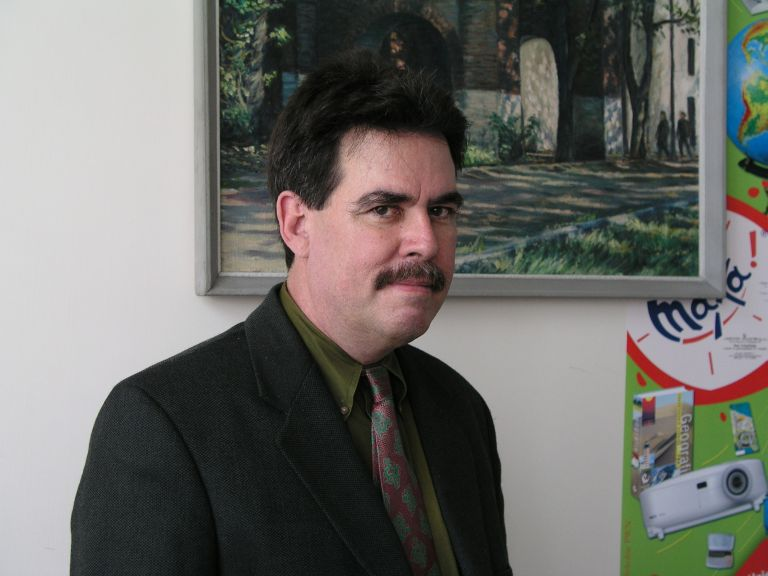
- Kevin Hannan, Łódź 2006
- Born: January 22, 1954; La Marque, Texas, United States
- Died: January 5, 2008 (aged 53); Sanok, Poland
- Occupations: ethnolinguist and slavicist
- Spouse: Hanna

Kevin J. Hannan (January 22, 1954 – January 5, 2008) was an American ethnolinguist and slavicist.

== Personal life ==
He was born into a family of Silesian and Irish ancestry. Kevin Hannan married Hanna, a Polish American, and had two daughters with her, Marianna and Celeste.

== Education and Academic Career ==
Hannan graduated with a BA degree from Stephen F. Austin State University, Nacogdoches, Texas and a Master of Arts degree from the University of Texas at Austin. He was the first student to receive a doctorate in Slavonic Philology from the latter university.

He earned a living by working for Mills Electrical Contractors in Austin, Texas. In 2002, he left the United States, and resumed his research and academic career at the University of Łódź, in Łódź, Poland.

== Research ==
Hannan grew up in Texas, where the descendants of the original Central European settlers, until recently, preserved their local dialects/languages, commonly referred to as Bohemian (Czech), Moravian, and Silesian. This early experience of multiethnicity and multilingualism, along with family links to Czech Silesia, inspired him to embark on the doctoral research to comprehend the shaping and maintenance of ethnolinguistic and religious difference in the borderland region (that borders on Poland and Slovakia) in the broader context of Central Europe. His wide-ranging findings, he presented in Borders of Language and Identity in Teschen Silesia (1996), which is a monograph on the ethnolinguistic present of the Cieszyn Silesia.

After resuming his research near the end of the 20th century, Hannan widely travelled in Ukraine, Poland, Russia, and the Balkans. He came to the conclusion that civic cosmopolitanism, divorced from localized ethnic values as embodied in long-lasting ethnic groups (often imagined as nations), failed people. An epitome of such a situation he saw in his native United States, which, according to him, explained a constant increase in genealogical research in the country, observed since the 1970s. In this line of thinking, a person can find one's identity only in one's ethnolinguistic ancestry, not in the technical rationalism of law and economy. Hence, the United States could never become a 'real ethnic country'. Hannan would write one book and frequently post online under the pseudonym "Stojgniev O'Donnell", where he expanded on his ethnic superiority views in racist and anti-Semitic terms.

As a positive alternative to the de-ethnicized United States he posed the ethnic values of Poland in his My Poland: Essays on Polish Identity / Moja Polska. Eseje o polskości from 2005. He did, on occasion, make note of the failings of Polish nationalism and national statehood such as the long-lasting preservation of serfdom and the never-ending quest for ethnolinguistic purity, which led to vast ethnic cleansing in the communist period (1944–1989). He was especially critical of the relentless Polonization of Belarusians, Rusyns (Lemkos), and Ukrainians, who, in his eyes, preserved 'real Slavic spirituality,' as encapsulated in Greek Catholicism, Orthodox Christianity, and the liturgical language of Church Slavonic.

Hannan chose Poland as his adopted homeland in preference to the Czech Republic, which he perceived as an example of an overexclusive ethnic nationalism, which led to the 1993 breakup of Czechoslovakia, producing this nation-state and another, Slovakia. He qualified any strong-Polonist sentiments by saying that 'his Poland' was the southern half of the country skirted by the multilingual, multiethnic, and multiconfessional Carpathians. He wrote lyrically about this area in his collection of poems, Bounties of Collective Memory / Dary zbiorowej pamięci from 2006.

== Books ==
- Hannan, Kevin (1996). Borders of Language and Identity in Teschen Silesia. Berkeley Insights in Linguistics and Semiotics. New York: Peter Lang. ISBN 0-8204-3365-9.
- [O'Donnell, Stojgniev, pseudonym] Why I Left America: Reflections on History, Culture and Religion / Dlaczego wyjechałem z Ameryki. Refleksje nad historią, kulturą i religią (translated into Polish by Anna and Jarosław Fejdych). 2003. Marklowice: The Celto-Slavic Fellowship of Apiarists and Bielsko-Biała: Prasa Beskidzka. ISBN 83-87237-25-6.
- My Poland: Essays on Polish Identity / Moja Polska. Eseje o polskości (translated by Jacek Serwański et al.). 2005. Poznań: Wydawnictwo Poznańskie. ISBN 83-7177-204-1.
- Bounties of Collective Memory / Dary zbiorowej pamięci (Series: Rzecz Poetycka). 2006. Łódź: biblioteka. ISBN 978-83-88529-18-4 [collection of poems].

== Articles and Book Chapters ==
- Analogical Change in West Slavic Be (pp 306–324). 1993. Journal of Slavic Linguistics. No 2, Summer-Fall.
- The Language Question in Nineteenth Century Moravia (pp 116–125). 1993. Czechoslovak and Central European Journal (formerly Kosmas). No 2, Winter.
- Some Unpublished Poems of Óndra Łysohorsky (pp 98–123). 1995. Oxford Slavonic Papers. Vol XXVIII (New Series).
- Identity and Assimilation among the Poles of Zaolzie. 1996. The Sarmatian Review. No 1, Jan. http://www.ruf.rice.edu/~sarmatia/196/Hannan.html
- Ethnic Identity Among the Czechs and Moravians of Texas (pp 3–31). 1996. Journal of American Ethnic History. No 4, Summer.
- Hannan, Kevin (Winter 1996). "The Lachian Literary Language of Óndra Łysohorsky". The Slavic and East European Journal. 40 (4). The Slavic and East European Journal, Vol. 40, No. 4: 726–743. doi:10.2307/310109. JSTOR 310109.
- K lingvistickému přehodnocení Łysohorského literární laštiny (pp 39–47). In: K Jánasová, ed. 1996. Óndra Łysohorský, 1905–1989. Kolokvium uskutečněné ve dnech 8.-10. červena 1995 u příležitosti nedožitých 90. narozenin básníka. Frýdek-Místek: Muzeum Beskyd. ISBN 978-80-901843-6-7.
- Hannan, Kevin (June 1999). "Language and Ethnicity among Students in Teschen Silesia". Nationalities Papers. 27 (2): 191–203. doi:10.1080/009059999109028. S2CID 146983659.
- Ethnic Identities in Austrian and Czech Silesia before the Second World War (pp 225–243). In: Kai Struve and Philipp Ther, eds. 2002. Die Grenzen der Nationen. Identitätenwandel in Oberschlesien in der Neuzeit (Series: Tagungen zur Ostmitteleuropa-Forschung, vol 15). Marburg: Herder-Institut. ISBN 3-87969-298-X.
- Reflections on Assimilation and Language Death in Czech-Moravian Texas (pp 110–132). 2003. Kosmas: Czechoslovak and Central European Journal. No 2, Spring.
- O urokach i stereotypach polskości (pp 135–148). 2003. Sprawy Narodowościowe. No 22.
- Polish Catholicism: A Historical Outline (pp 1008–1015). 2004. The Sarmatian Review. No 1, Jan.
- Lech kocha Głupią Ludmiłę. Polacy i stereotypy słowiańskości a "Malowany ptak" Jerzego Kosińskiego (pp 67–84). 2005. Er(r)go. No 2.
- Experiencing the Divine Conversation: Liturgical Languages of Eastern Christians in Contemporary Poland (pp 263–294). 2005. The Polish Review. No 3.
- Polishness in the Borderlands (pp 205–226). In: Wojciech J. Burszta, Tomasz Kamusella and Sebastian Wojciechowski, eds. 2005. Nationalisms Across the Globe (Vol I: Europe). Poznań: School of Humanities and Journalism. ISBN 83-87653-51-9.
- The Historical and Linguistic Background of Lachian Regionalism and "Separatism" (pp 471–496). In: Wojciech J. Burszta, Tomasz Kamusella and Sebastian Wojciechowski, eds. 2005. Nationalisms Across the Globe (Vol I: Europe). Poznań: School of Humanities and Journalism. ISBN 83-87653-51-9.
- Citizen of the Borderlands: Óndra Łysohorsky (1905–1989) (pp 123–144). In: Maria Wanda Wanatowicz, ed. 2007. Józef Chlebowczyk – badacz procesów narodowotwórczych w Europie XIX I XX wieku (Ser: Prace Naukowe Uniwersytetu Śląskiego w Katowicach, Vol 2463). Katowice, Poland: Wydawnictwo Uniwersytetu Śląskiego. ISBN 978-83-226-1624-6, ISSN 0208-6336.
