= Błogocice, Cieszyn =

Coordinates: 49°43′52.5″N 18°38′3.4″E

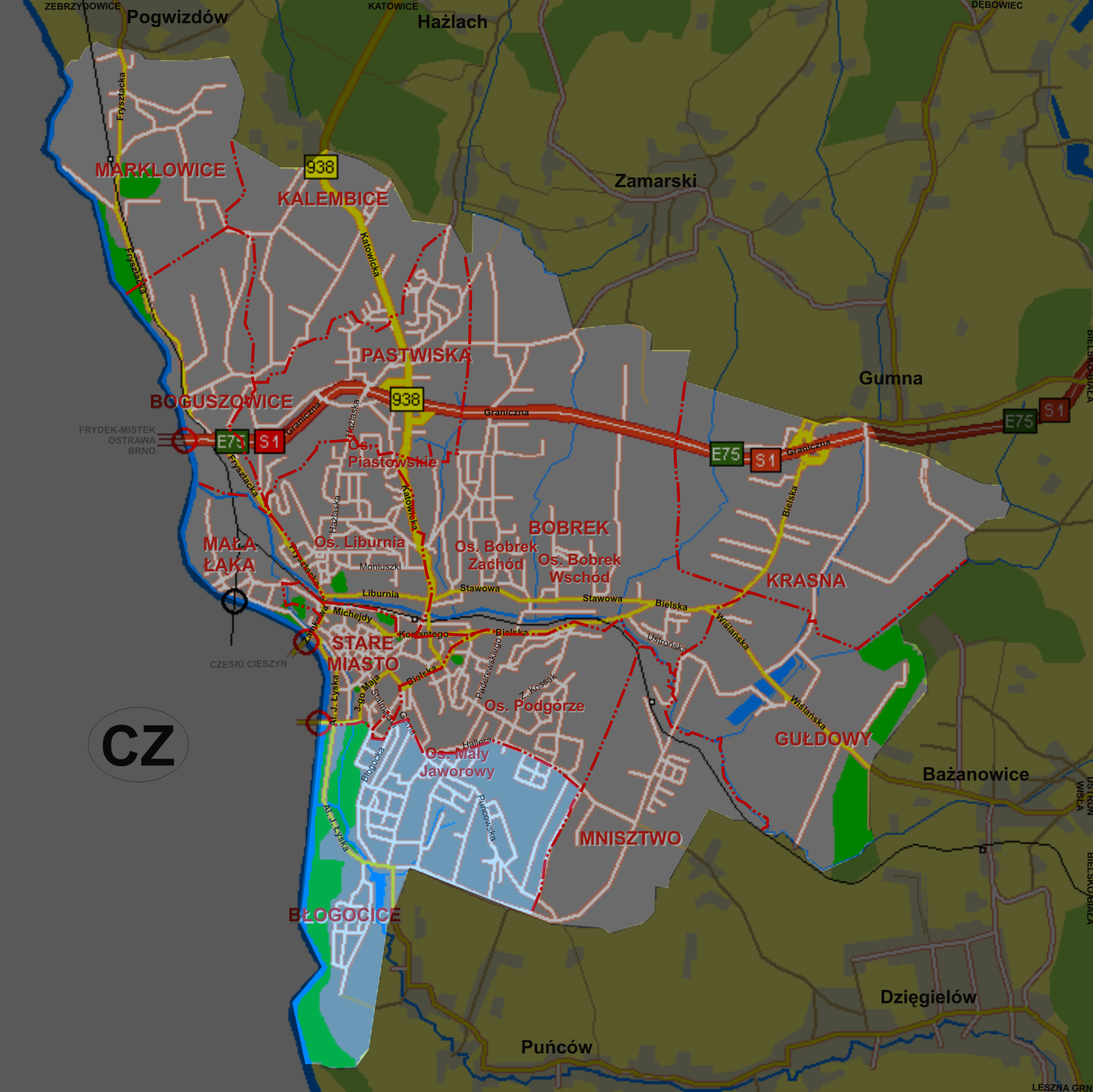
Błogocice highlighted on map of Cieszyn

Błogocice is a district of Cieszyn, Silesian Voivodeship, Poland. It was a separate municipality, but became administratively a part of Cieszyn in 1923.

The village was first mentioned in 1447. It belonged then to the Duchy of Teschen, formed in 1290. Since 1791 it belonged to Komora Cieszyńska. Before 1920 it was administratively a part of Svibice, but after division of Cieszyn Silesia in that year it became a separate municipality. Three years later it was submerged with Cieszyn.
