= Svibice =

Coordinates: 49°44′0″N 18°36′52″E

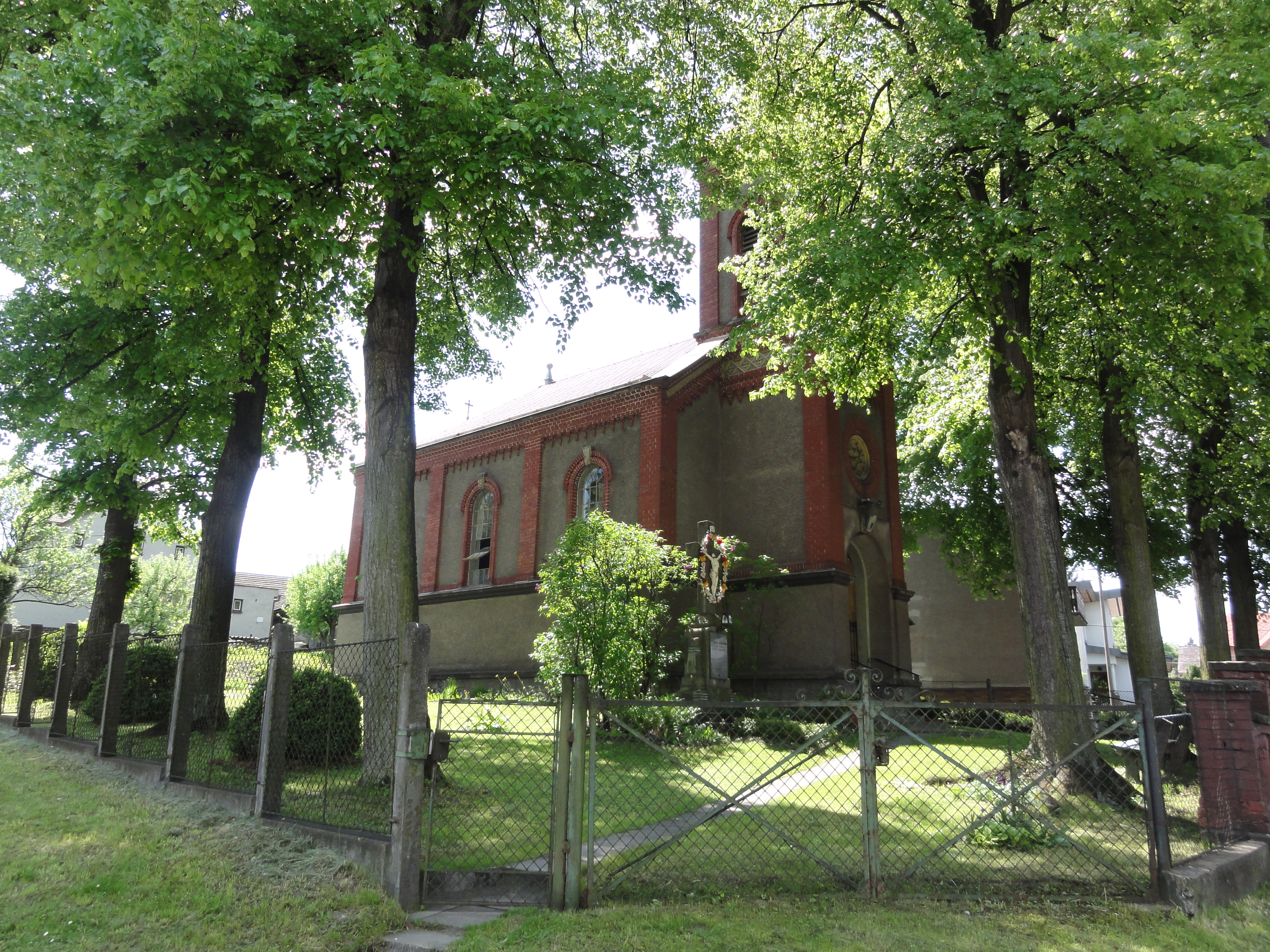
Church of Saint Hedwig

Svibice (Polish: Sibica, German: Schibitz) was a village in Karviná District, Moravian-Silesian Region, Czech Republic. It was a separate municipality but became administratively a part of Český Těšín in 1947.

The name is derived from the świba bush, from the cornus genius.

== History ==
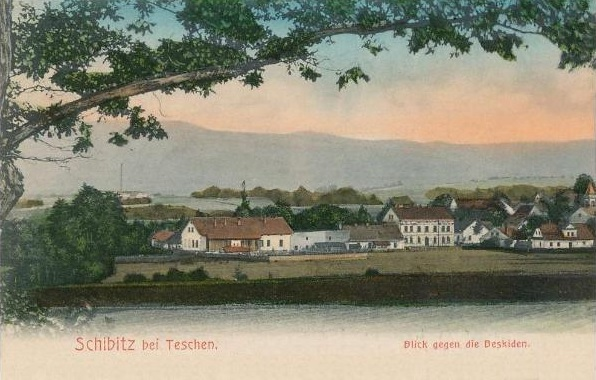
Svibice in 1907

The village was first mentioned in 1461 as Swibiczi. Politically the village belonged then to the Duchy of Teschen, a fee of the Kingdom of Bohemia, which after 1526 became part of the Habsburg monarchy.

After Revolutions of 1848 in the Austrian Empire a modern municipal division was introduced in the re-established Austrian Silesia. The village as a municipality was subscribed to the political and legal district of Cieszyn. According to the censuses conducted in 1880, 1890, 1900 and 1910 the population of the municipality grew from 1,065 in 1880 to 2,386 in 1910 with a majority being native Polish-speakers (at most 79.2% in 1890, later dropping to 67.3% in 1910) accompanied by a German-speaking minority (growing in number from 212 or 20.6% in 1880 to 715 or 30.9% in 1910) and Czech-speaking people (at most 41 or 1.8% in 1910). In terms of religion in 1910 the majority were Roman Catholics (61%), followed by Protestants (37.4%), Jews (35 or 1.5%) and 3 people adhering to another faiths. The village was also traditionally inhabited by Cieszyn Vlachs, speaking Cieszyn Silesian dialect.

After World War I, fall of Austria-Hungary, Polish–Czechoslovak War and the division of Cieszyn Silesia in 1920, it became a part of Czechoslovakia. Before 1920 the village of Błogocice was administratively a part of Svibice. Following the Munich Agreement, in October 1938 together with the Zaolzie region it was annexed by Poland, administratively adjoined to Cieszyn County of Silesian Voivodeship. It was then annexed by Nazi Germany at the beginning of World War II. After the war it was restored to Czechoslovakia.

In 1947 Svibice was submerged with Český Těšín. During the communist era a massive construction of so-called paneláks occurred and Svibice was transformed into an urban neighbourhood. Some old houses still remain, although the majority of the population of Svibice live in paneláks.

== See also ==
- Polish minority in the Czech Republic
- Zaolzie
