= Krasna, Cieszyn =

Krasna
- District of Cieszyn
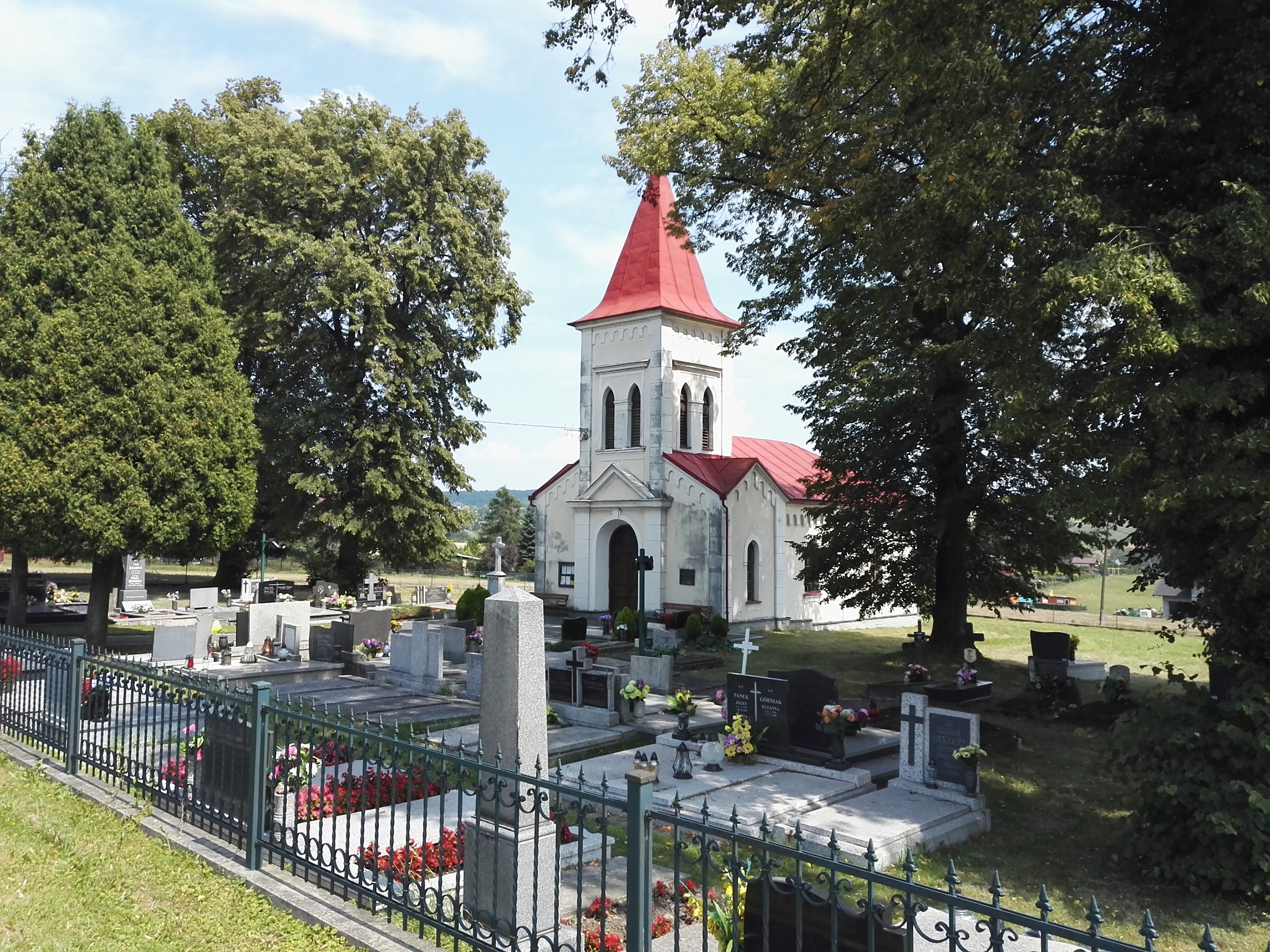
- Lutheran cemetery and chapel

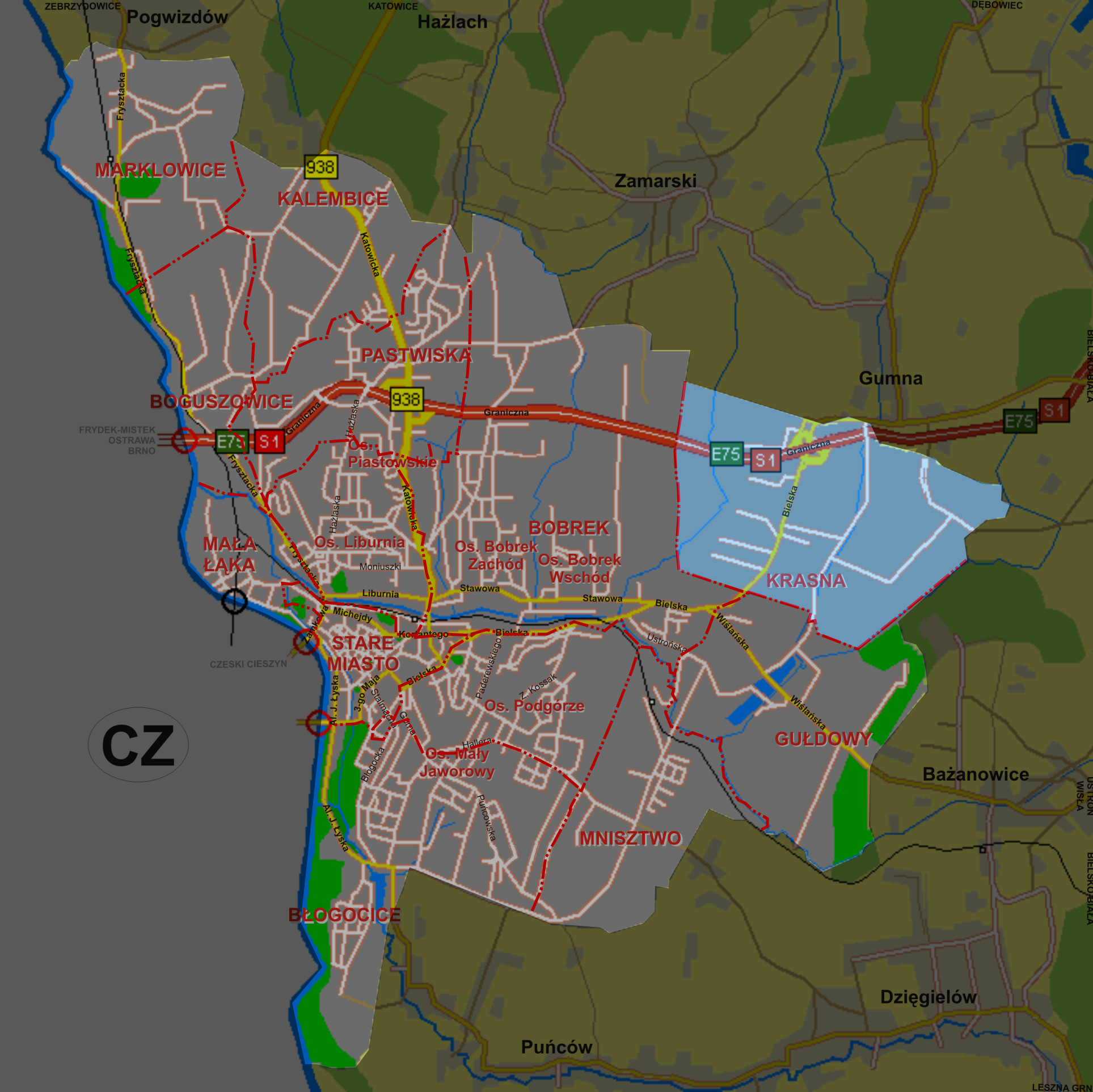
- Krasna highlighted on map of Cieszyn
- Coordinates: 49°45′15″N 18°40′39″E
- Country: Poland
- Voivodeship: Silesian
- County: Cieszyn
- Gmina/Town: Cieszyn
- Within town limits: 1973
- Time zone: UTC+1 (CET)
  - Summer (DST): UTC+2 (CEST)
- Vehicle registration: SCI

Krasna (German: Schöndorf, later Krasna) is a district of Cieszyn, Silesian Voivodeship, Poland. It was a separate municipality, but became administratively a part of Cieszyn in 1973. It lies in the Silesian Foothills and in the historical region of Cieszyn Silesia.

== Name ==
The name was at first scribed in Latin (Pulcra villa, 1284), then in German (Schondorf, 1439) and later in Czech (Krasney Wsy, 1457; Krasna Wes, 1523), eventually the noun Wes (a village) was dropped. The name literally means a beautiful [village] (nominative archaic Polish krasny and Czech krásný).

== History ==
Archaeological traces of the first farmers in the area from Lengyel culture (4th millennia BC) have been found in the village.

It was first mentioned in a written document in 1284 as Pulcra villa. Since 1290 it belonged to the then formed in the process of feudal fragmentation of Poland Duchy of Cieszyn that was ruled by a local branch of Piast dynasty. In 1327 the duchy became a fee of the Kingdom of Bohemia, which after 1526 became part of the Habsburg monarchy.

In 1610 it was given by Adam Wenceslaus to reestablished Dominican Abbey in Cieszyn as a recompense for their lost gardens. At the beginning of 20th century two cemetery chapels were built: a Catholic and a Lutheran.

After Revolutions of 1848 in the Austrian Empire a modern municipal division was introduced in the re-established Austrian Silesia. The village as a municipality was subscribed to the political and legal district of Cieszyn. According to the censuses conducted in 1880, 1890, 1900 and 1910 the population of the municipality grew from 483 in 1880 to 487 in 1910 with a majority being native Polish-speakers (97.1%–100%) accompanied by a small German-speaking minority (at most 14 or 2.9% in 1890, later nonexistent). In terms of religion in 1910 majority were Roman Catholics (65.7%), followed by Protestants (33.3%) and Jews (5 or 1%). The village was also traditionally inhabited by Cieszyn Vlachs, speaking Cieszyn Silesian dialect.

After World War I, fall of Austria-Hungary, Polish–Czechoslovak War and the division of Cieszyn Silesia in 1920, it became a part of Poland, which just regained independence. It was then annexed by Nazi Germany at the beginning of World War II. During the German occupation, the occupiers operated the E386 forced labour subcamp of the Stalag VIII-B/344 prisoner-of-war camp in Krasna. After the war, the settlement was restored to Poland.
