= Gułdowy =

Coordinates: 49°44′35″N 18°40′35.7″E

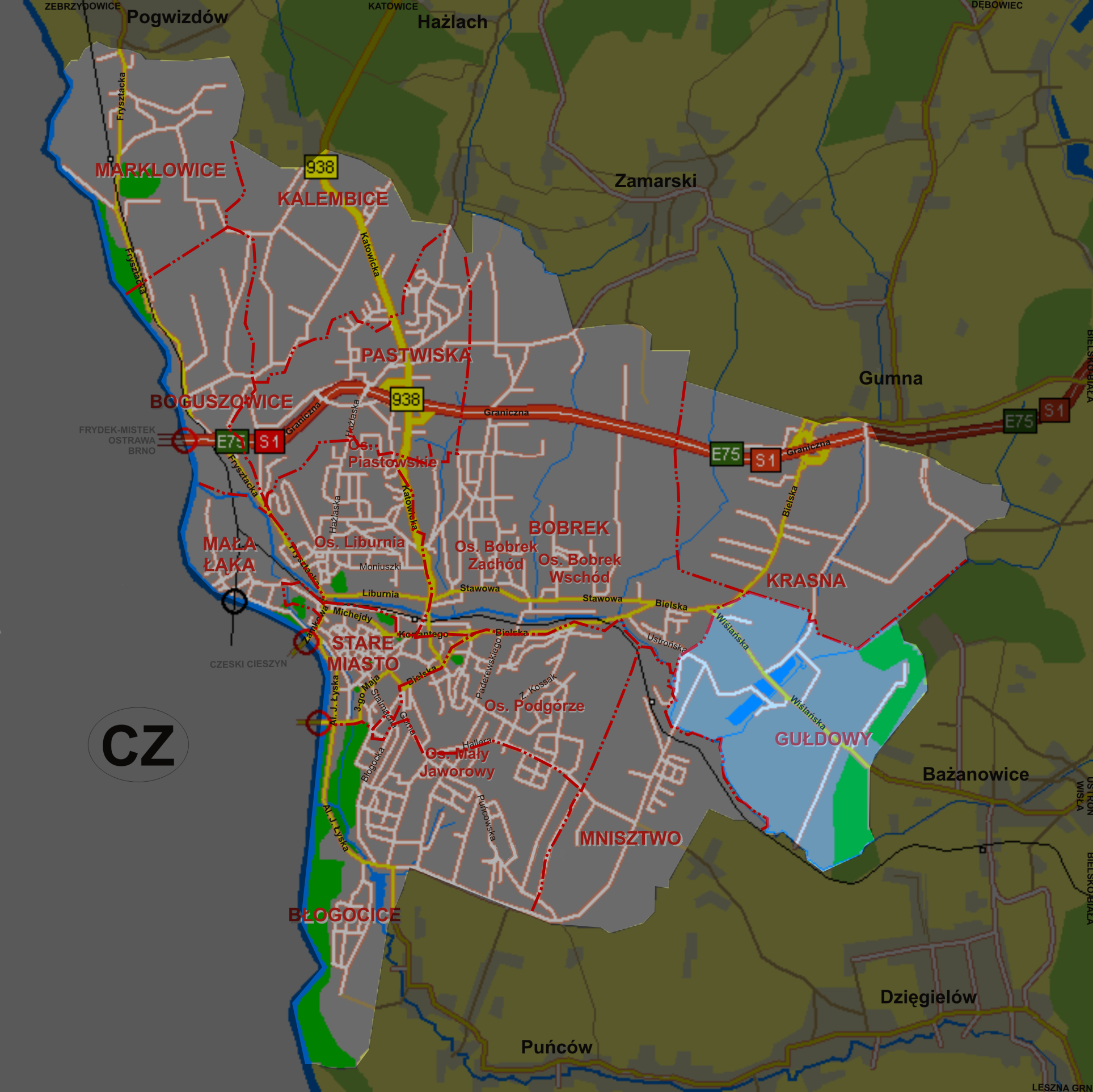
Gułdowy highlighted on map of Cieszyn

Gułdowy is a district of Cieszyn, Silesian Voivodeship, Poland. It was a separate municipality, but became administratively a part of Cieszyn in 1973.

The village was first mentioned in 1461. It belonged then to the Duchy of Cieszyn, formed in 1290.

== People born in Gułdowy ==
- Jan Szuścik (1879-1941), Polish teacher, politician, member of the Silesian Parliament
- Józef Czudek (1883-1941), Polish teacher, Jesuit
