= Janusz Spyra =

Polish historian (born 1958)

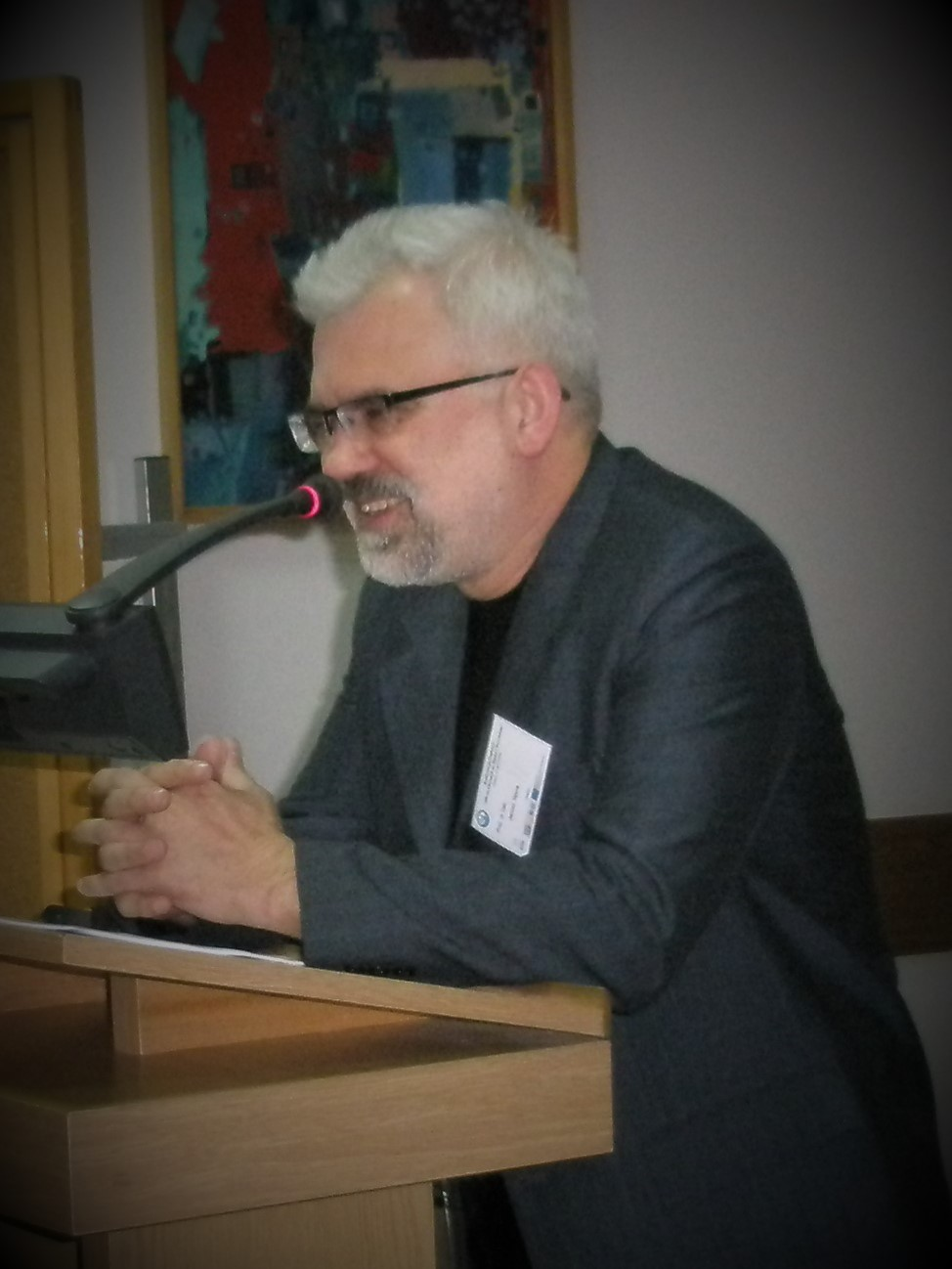
- Born: 26 October 1958 (age 67)
- Education: Jagiellonian University
- Occupation: historian
- Title: prof. dr hab.

Dr Hab. Janusz Jan Spyra (born 26 October 1958) is a Polish historian. He is specializing in history of Cieszyn Silesia.

He graduated from the Jagiellonian University. In 1994 he gained a Ph.D. from the University of Silesia. In 2007 Spyra passed his habilitation. In 2017 he gained a title of professor.

== Works ==
- Żydowskie zabytki Cieszyna i Czeskiego Cieszyna (1999)
- Dzieje miłosierdzia: Zgromadzenie Sióstr Miłosierdzia św. Karola Boromeusza w Cieszynie (1876-2001) (2002, with Fabiana Izydorczyk)
- Cieszyn - mały Wiedeń (2003, with Mariusz Makowski)
- Moneta w dawnym Cieszynie (2005)
- Żydzi na Śląsku Austriackim (1742-1918): Od tolerowanych Żydów do żydowskiej gminy wyznaniowej (2005)
- Szlak książąt cieszyńskich: Piastowie (2007)
- Wisła: dzieje beskidzkiej wsi do 1918 roku (2007)
- Via sacra - kościoły i klasztory w Cieszynie i Czeskim Cieszynie (2008)
- Żydowskie gminy wyznaniowe na Śląsku Austriackim (1742-1918) (2009)
- Śląsk Cieszyński w okresie 1653-1848 (2012)
- Historiografia a tożsamość regionalna w czasach nowożytnych na przykładzie Śląska Cieszyńskiego w okresie od XVI do początku XX wieku (2015)
- Biografický slovník rabínů rakouského Slezska (2015)
- Rabbiner in der Provinz. Die Rolle des Rabbiners im Leben der jüdischen Gemeinschaft in Teschener und Troppauer Schlesien, Berlin: Peter Lang 2018 (= Polnische Studien zur Germanistik, Kulturwissenschaft und Linguistik; Band 9)
- Nauczyciele oraz ich stowarzyszenia na tle dyskursu społecznego w modernizującej się Europie (na przykładzie Śląska Austriackiego) (2019) (co-author: Marzena Bogus)
- Pieniądz w służbie społeczeństwa. Towarzystwo Oszczędności i Zaliczek i inne polskie instytucje bankowości spółdzielczej na Śląsku Cieszyńskim (2023)
