= Stalag VIII-D =

German prisoner-of-war camp

Stalag VIII-D / Stalag VIII-B/Z / Stalag VIII-B
- Teschen, Silesia
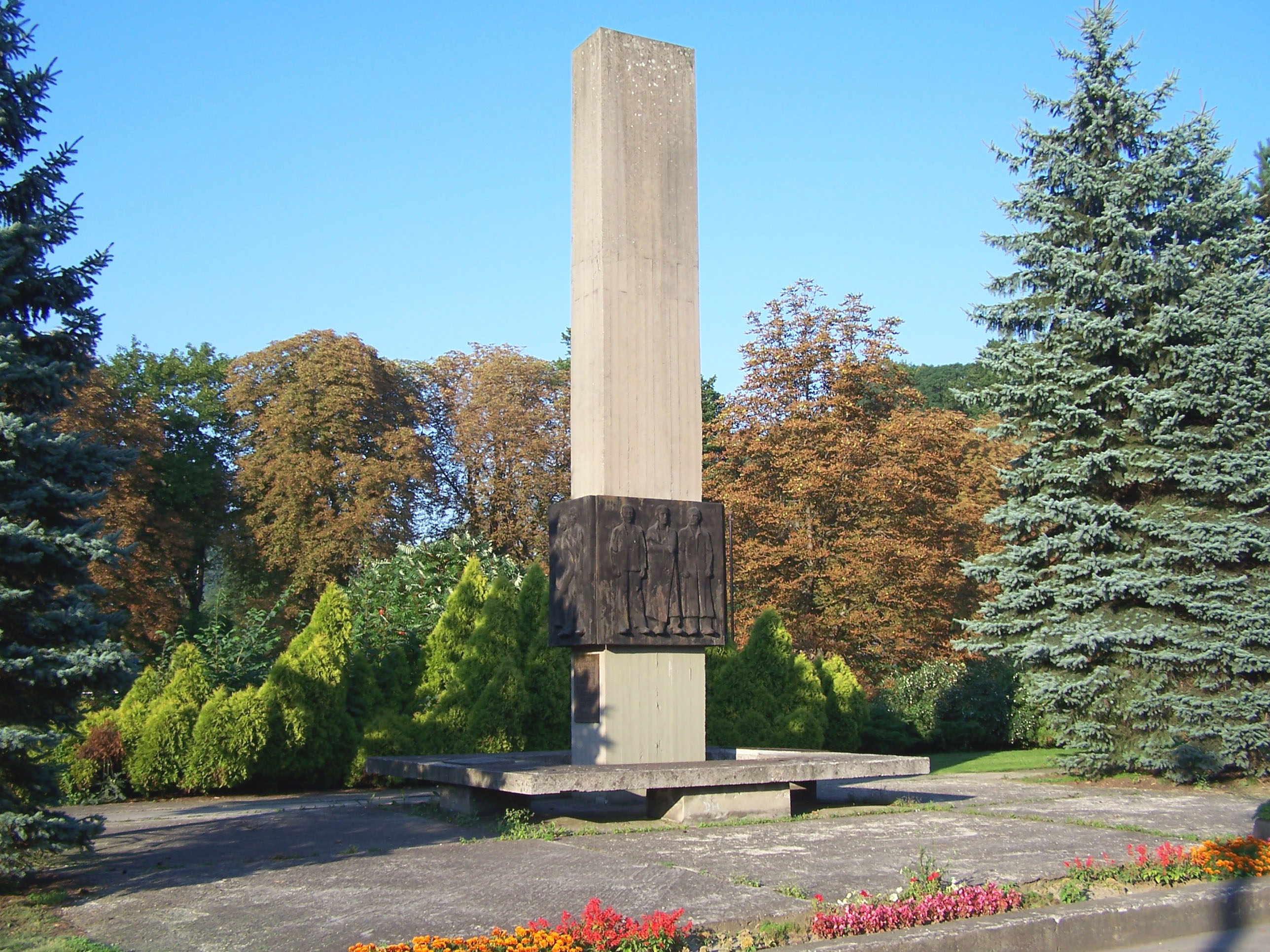
- Memorial dedicated to World War II resistance fighters on the site of Stalag VIII-D

Site information
- Type: Prisoner-of-war camp
- Controlled by: Nazi Germany

Location
- Český Těšín, Czech Republic
- Coordinates: 49.74876°N 18.62318°E

Site history
- In use: 1941–1945

Garrison information
- Occupants: Allied POW

Stalag VIII-D was a German World War II prisoner-of-war camp (Stammlager) located at the outskirts of Teschen, (now Český Těšín, Czech Republic). It was built in March 1941 on the grounds of a former Czech barracks. It was later known as Stalag VIII-B.

== Camp history ==
The camp was created in 1941 as the base camp for a number of work-camps (Arbeitskommando) for prisoners of war working in the mines and industries of Upper Silesia. By early 1942 they housed 7,000 prisoners from Belgium, France, Poland and Yugoslavia. In June 1943 it was placed under the administrative control of Stalag VIII-B Lamsdorf and was renamed Stalag IV-B/Z. In November 1943 there was another reorganization, Lamsdorf was renamed "Stalag 344", and a large number of prisoners were transferred to Teschen, which became Stalag VIII-B. Because of these organizational and number changes there is considerable confusion in accounts of prisoners, even in official German records.

At the end of 1943 within Stalag VIII-B Teschen there were about 50,000 Soviet prisoners, and another 10,000 from other countries, including Great Britain, the Commonwealth and Italy. In general, the conditions in the main Teschen camp and in all the sub-camps were deplorable.

== Arbeitkommandos ==
Among the sub-camps of Stalag VIII-D Teschen were:

- Kommando E535 - Milwitz Coal mine "Milwitzgrube" SOSNOWITZ - Milowice (Sosnowiec), mainly New Zealanders.
- Kommando E715 - IG Farben's Buna Werke, Monowitz, 1,400 British prisoners from the North Africa campaign.

== Evacuation and repatriation ==
From 21 January 1945, many of the prisoners, particularly British and Commonwealth, were marched through Nazi-occupied Czech lands to Stalag XIII-C in Bavaria or Stalag XIII-D Nürnberg. The march, in temperatures of -15 °C to -20 °C, caused great distress and many prisoners died. The Czech people in the villages and towns, through which they passed, passed food and clothing to them. Many prisoners managed to escape and were sheltered in private homes. The men were marched along country roads towards the Oder, first north towards Dresden, then when the Germans changed their mind, south towards Bavaria, eventually reaching Stalag XIII-D near Nuremberg.

== See also ==
- List of prisoner-of-war camps in Germany
