= Edward Długajczyk =

Polish historian (born 1939)

- Born: Edward Stanisław Długajczyk; 1939 (age 86–87)
- Occupation: Historian
- Board member of: Silesian Museum

Academic background
- Education: University of Silesia in Katowice
- Thesis: (1972)

Academic work
- Discipline: History
- Sub-discipline: Military history
- Main interests: Upper Silesia

Edward Stanisław Długajczyk (born 1939) is a Polish historian. He is specializing in history of Upper Silesia in the 20th century.

He graduated in Polish philology from Jagiellonian University. In 1972 he gained a Ph.D. from University of Silesia in Katowice. In 1982 E.Długajczyk passed his habilitation, since 2004 title of professor.

== Works ==
- Sanacja śląska 1926-1939: zarys dziejów politycznych (1983)
- Ludzie z bieruńskiego ratusza: rzecz o burmistrzach i radzie miejskiej w latach 1919-1939 (1989)
- Bieruń Stary w dokumentach archiwalnych: materiały do planu zagospodarowania przestrzennego z lat 1946-1947 (1990)
- Oblicze polityczne i własnościowe prasy polskiej w województwie śląskim 1922-1939 (1990)
- Trudne lata nadziei: Bieruń Stary 1945-1950 (1990)
- Podział Górnego Śląska w 1922 roku (1992)
- Tajny front na granicy cieszyńskiej: wywiad i dywersja w latach 1919-1939 (1993)
- Grupy Z i N : polskie przygotowania dywersji wojskowej w Niemczech w latach 1921-1925 (1997)
- Wywiad polski na Górnym Śląsku 1919-1922 (2001)
- Polska konspiracja wojskowa na Śląsku Cieszyńskim w latach 1919-1920 (2005)
